= Graffiti =

Drawings and paintings on surfaces

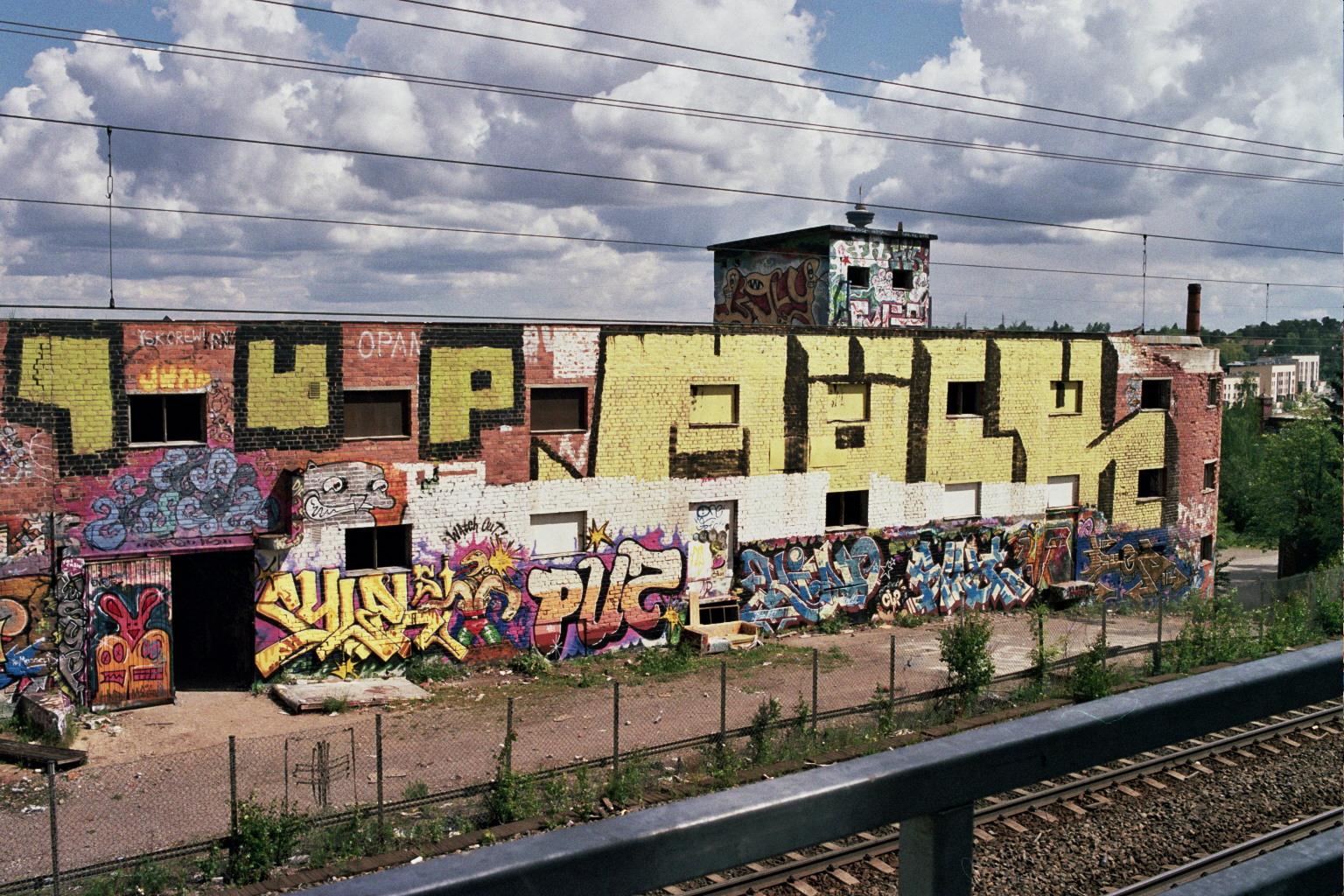
- An abandoned roof felt factory in Santalahti, Finland which has been painted with graffiti, including work by 1UP (top left), 2012

Additional media
- Years active: 1960s-present
- Major figures: TAKI 183; Cornbread; Banksy
- Influences: Hip-hop culture
- Influenced: Commercial graffiti; Public art; Street art; Urban art

Graffiti (singular graffiti, or graffito only in graffiti archaeology) is writing or drawings made on a wall or other surface, usually without permission and within public view. Graffiti ranges from simple written "monikers" to elaborate wall paintings, and has existed since ancient times, with examples dating back to ancient Egypt, ancient Greece, and the Roman Empire.

Modern graffiti is a controversial subject. In most countries, marking or painting property without permission is considered vandalism. Modern graffiti began in the New York City subway system and Philadelphia in the early 1970s and later spread to the rest of the United States and throughout the world.

Graffiti is distinguished from murals, an often legally permitted form of street art.

== Etymology ==
"Graffiti" (usually both singular and plural) and the rare singular form "graffito" are from the Italian word graffiato ("scratched"). In ancient times graffiti were carved on walls with a sharp object, although sometimes chalk or coal were used. The word originates from Greek γράφειν—graphein—meaning "to write".

== History ==
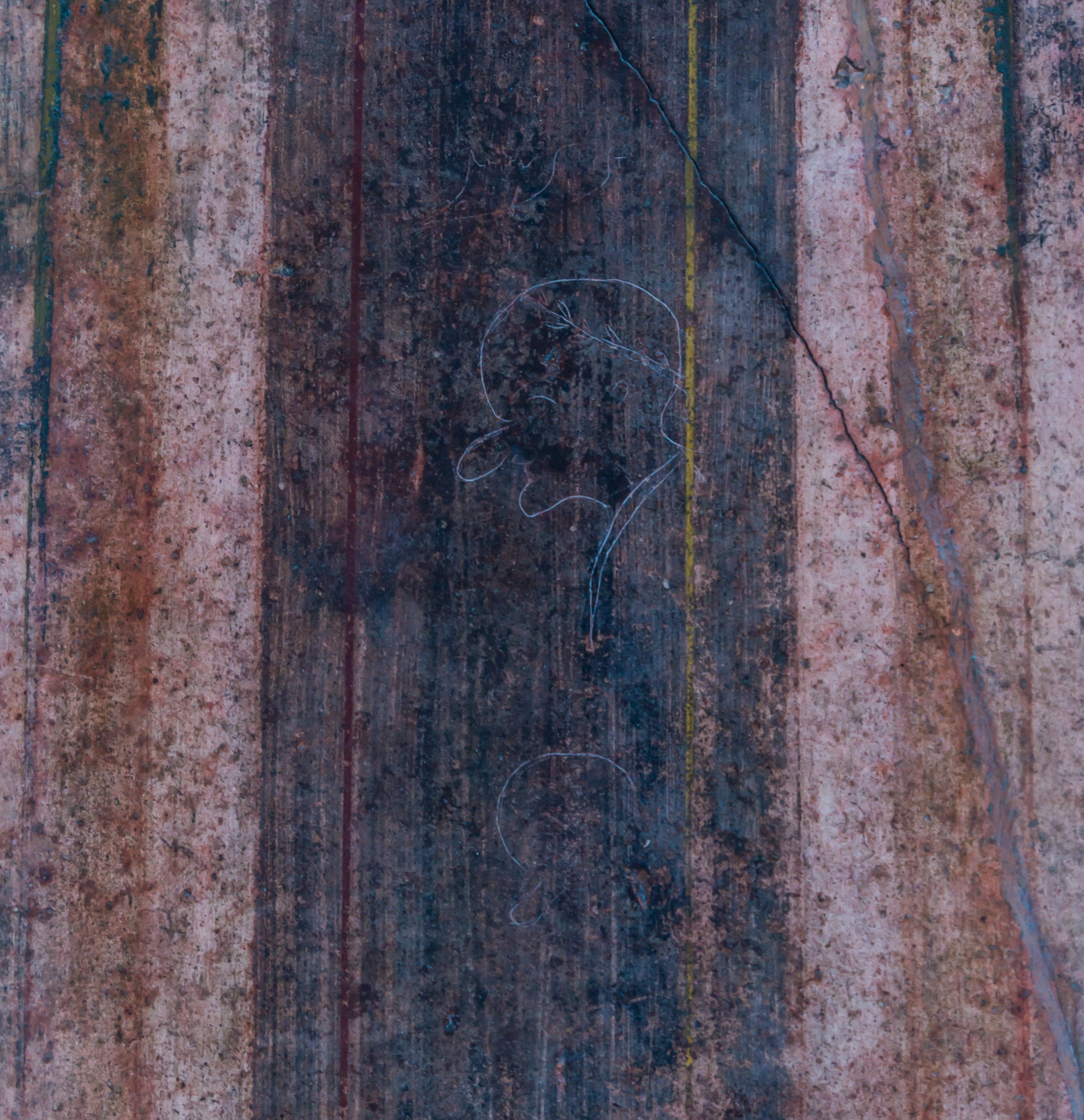
Ancient Pompeii graffito caricature of a politician. Villa of the Mysteries

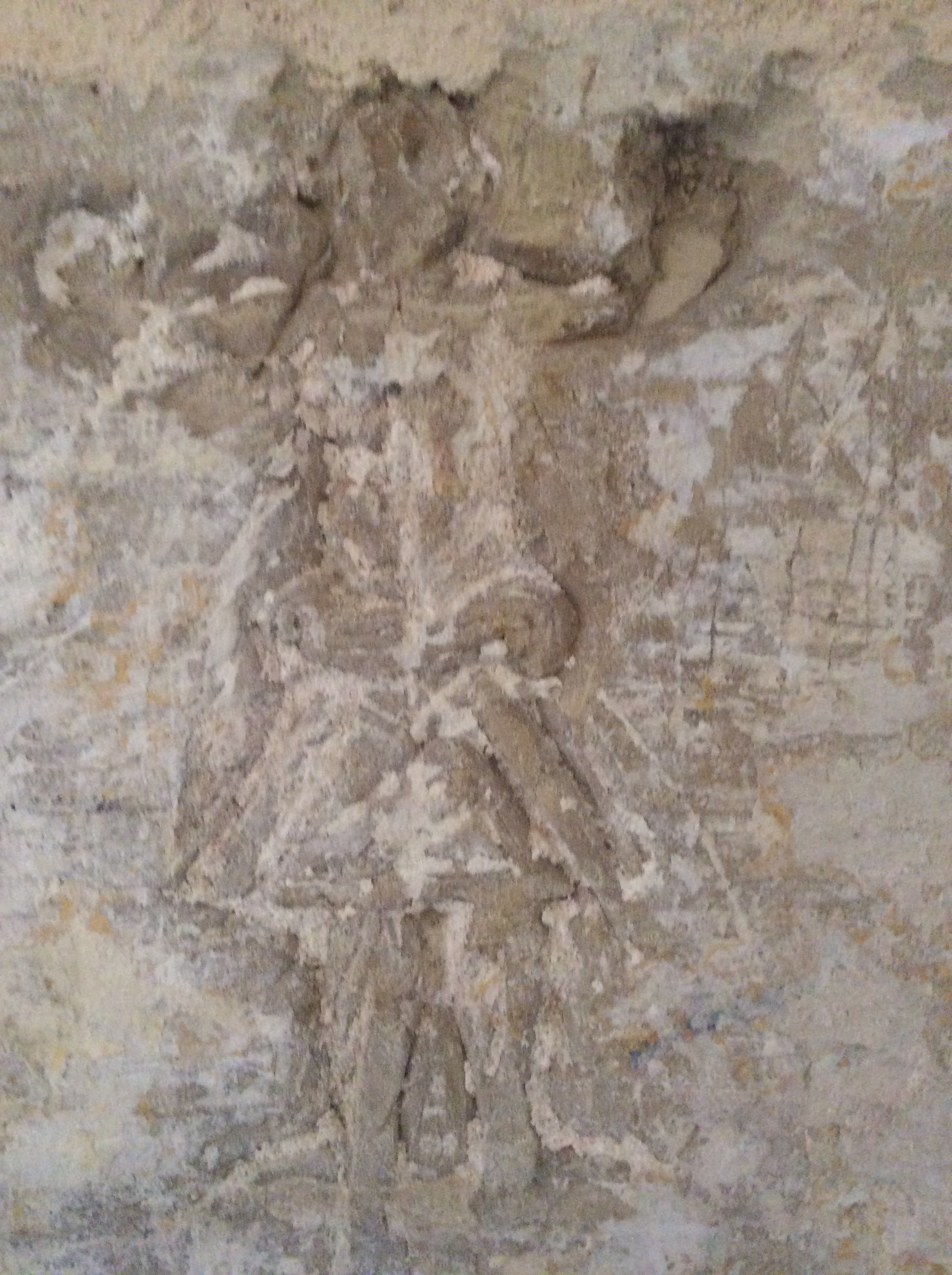
Figure graffito, similar to a relief, at the Castellania, in Valletta

=== Prehistoric ===
Most petroglyphs and geoglyphs date between 40,000 and 10,000 years old, the oldest being cave paintings in Australia. Paintings in the Chauvet Cave were made 35,000 years ago, but little is known about who made them or why. Early artists created stencil graffiti of their hands with paint blown through a tube. These stencils may have functioned similarly to a modern-day tag.

=== Ancient ===
The oldest known written graffito was found on the Greek island of Astypalaia and is dated to around 500 BC. Most graffiti from the time was boasts about sexual experiences, but also includes word games such as the Sator Square, "I was here" type markings, and comments on gladiators. Graffiti in Ancient Rome was a form of communication, and was generally not considered vandalism. The Alexamenos graffito was later seen as blasphemous and removed. It may contain one of the earliest depictions of Jesus. The graffito features a human with the head of a donkey on a cross with a Greek inscription translated as 'Alexamenos worships [his] god'.

=== Medieval ===
The only known source of the Safaitic language, an ancient form of Arabic, is from graffiti: inscriptions scratched on to the surface of rocks and boulders in the predominantly basalt desert of southern Syria, eastern Jordan and northern Saudi Arabia. Safaitic dates from the first century BC to the fourth century AD.

Ancient tourists visiting the 5th-century citadel at Sigiriya in Sri Lanka write their names and commentary over the "mirror wall", adding up to over 1800 individual graffiti produced there between the 6th and 18th centuries. Most of the graffiti refer to the frescoes of semi-nude females found there.

Among the ancient political graffiti examples were Arab satirist poems. Yazid al-Himyari, an Umayyad Arab and Persian poet, was most known for writing his political poetry on the walls between Sajistan and Basra, manifesting a strong hatred towards the Umayyad regime and its walis, and people used to read and circulate them very widely.

Graffiti, known as Tacherons, were frequently scratched on Romanesque Scandinavian church walls. When Renaissance artists such as Pinturicchio, Raphael, Michelangelo, Ghirlandaio, or Filippino Lippi descended into the ruins of Nero's Domus Aurea, they carved or painted their names and returned to initiate the grottesche style of decoration.

Ancient graffiti

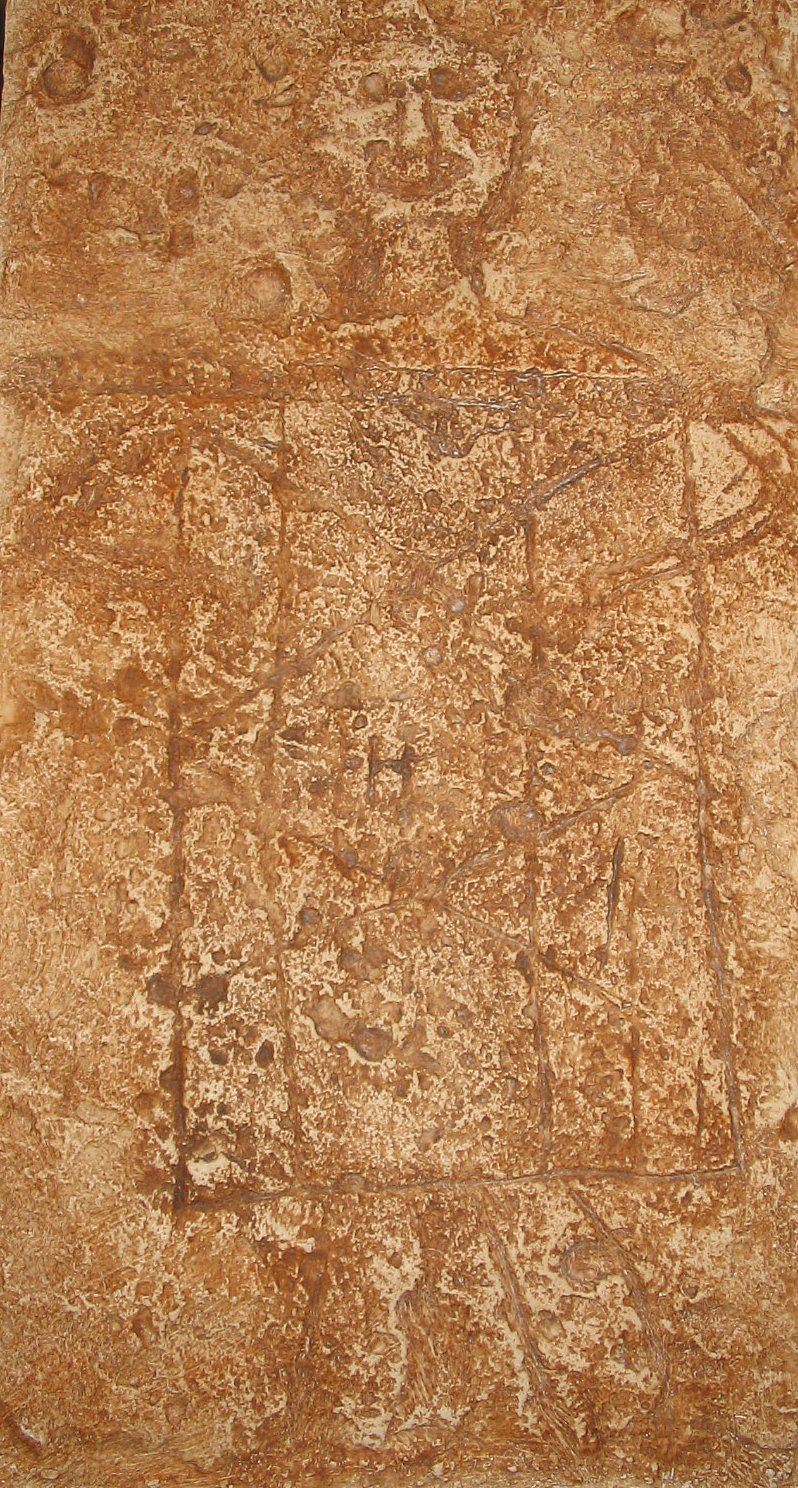
Graffiti from the Museum of Ancient Graffiti, France

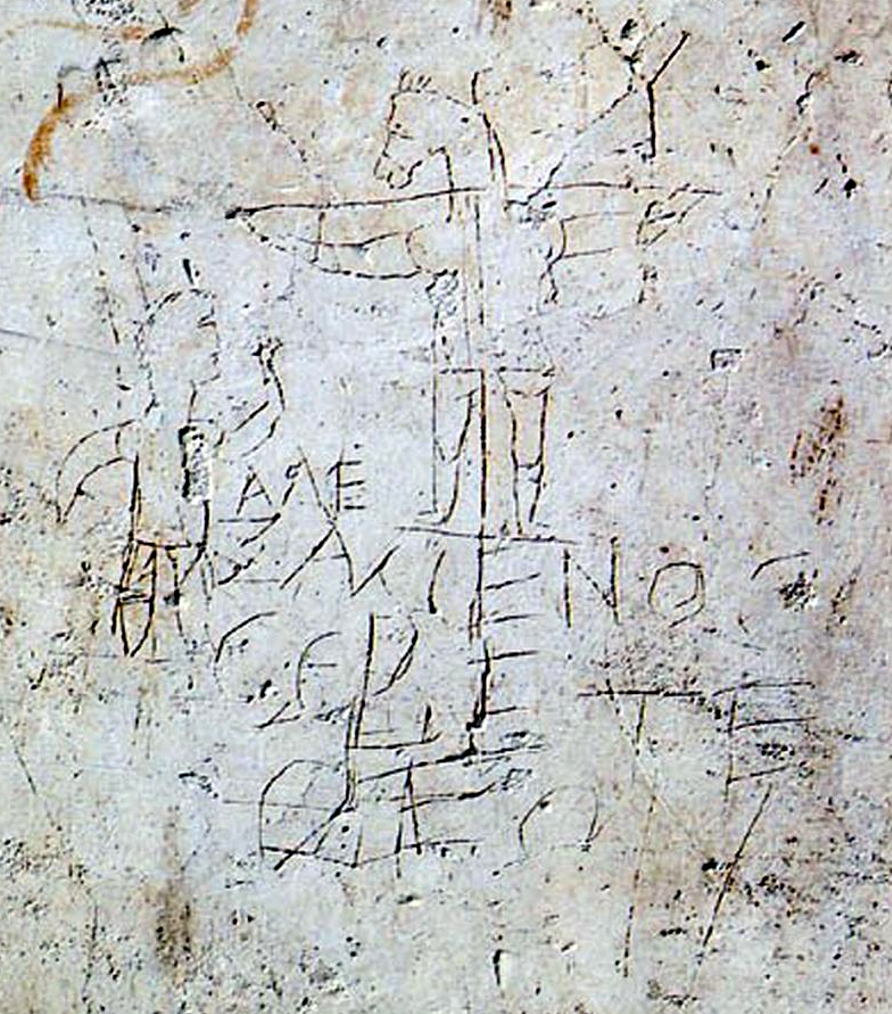
Satirical Alexamenos graffito, possibly the earliest known representation of Jesus

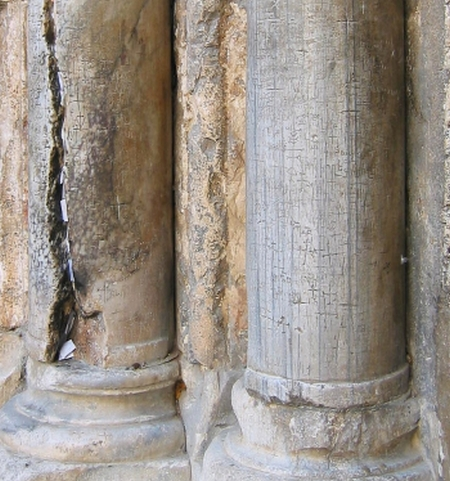
Graffiti, Church of the Holy Sepulchre, Jerusalem

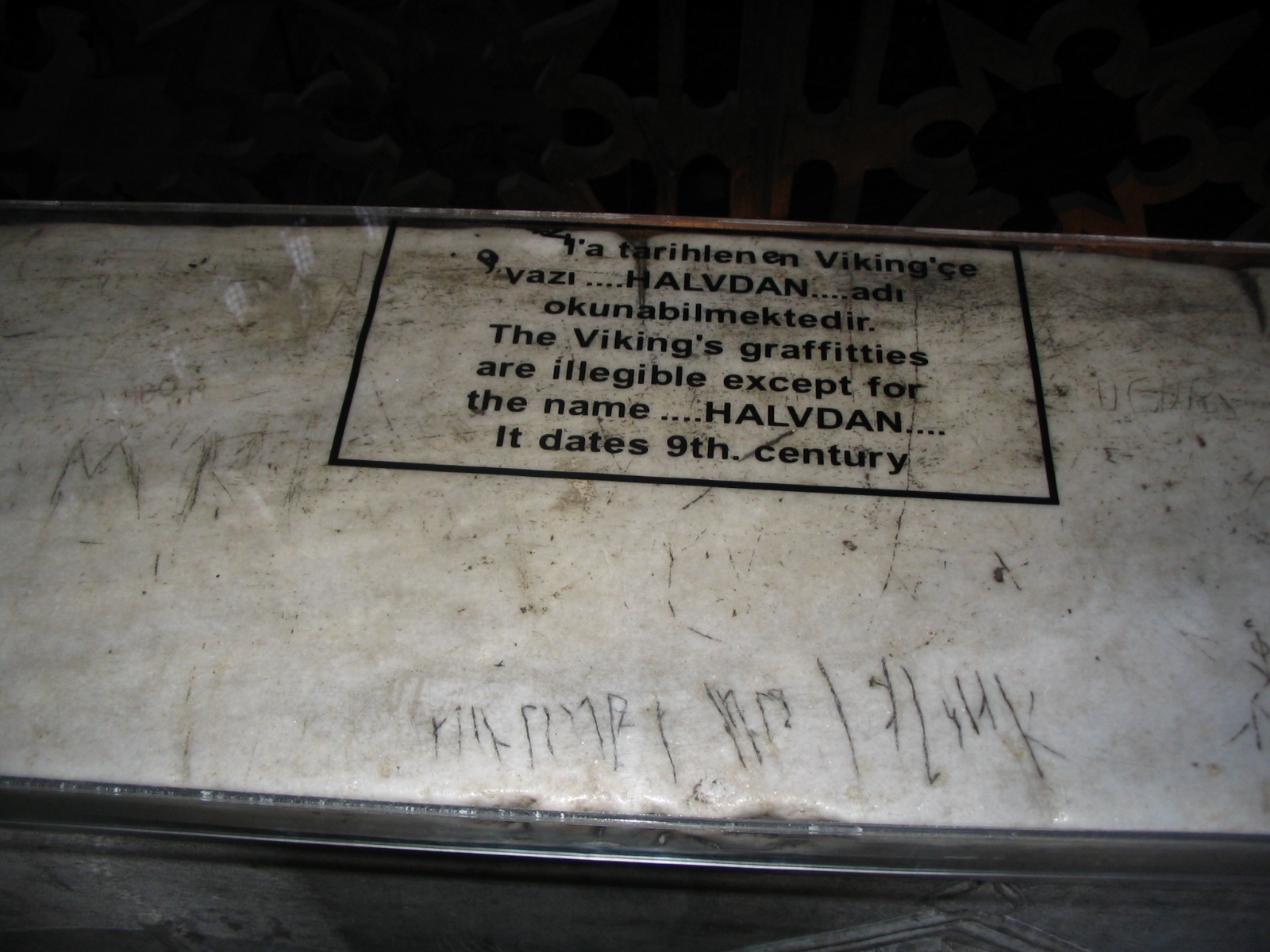
Viking mercenary graffiti at the Hagia Sophia in Istanbul, Turkey

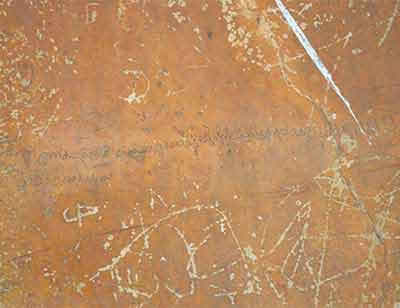
Graffiti on the Mirror Wall, Sigiriya, Sri Lanka

=== Contemporary ===
In the 1790s, French soldiers carved their names on monuments during the Napoleonic campaign of Egypt. Lord Byron's survives on one of the columns of the Temple of Poseidon at Sounion in Attica, Greece.

The oldest known example of graffiti monikers were found on traincars created by hobos and railworkers since the late 1800s. The Bozo Texino monikers were documented by filmmaker Bill Daniel in his 2005 film, Who is Bozo Texino?.

Contemporary graffiti has been seen on landmarks in the US, such as Independence Rock, a national landmark along the Oregon Trail.

In World War II, an inscription on a wall at the fortress of Verdun was seen as an illustration of the US response twice in a generation to the wrongs of the Old World:

Austin White – Chicago, Ill – 1918
Austin White – Chicago, Ill – 1945
This is the last time I want to write my name here.

During World War II and for decades after, the phrase "Kilroy was here" with an accompanying illustration was widespread throughout the world, due to its use by American troops and ultimately filtering into American popular culture. Shortly after the death of Charlie Parker (nicknamed "Yardbird" or "Bird"), graffiti began appearing around New York with the words "Bird Lives".

World War II graffiti

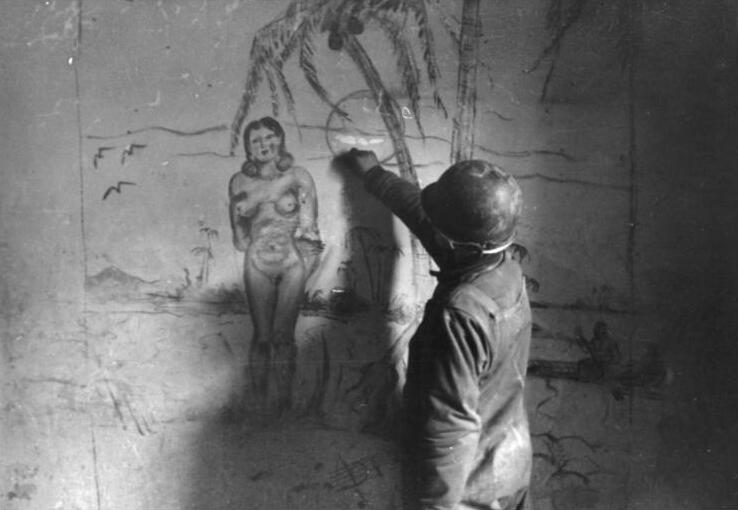
Soldier with tropical fantasy graffiti (1943–1944)

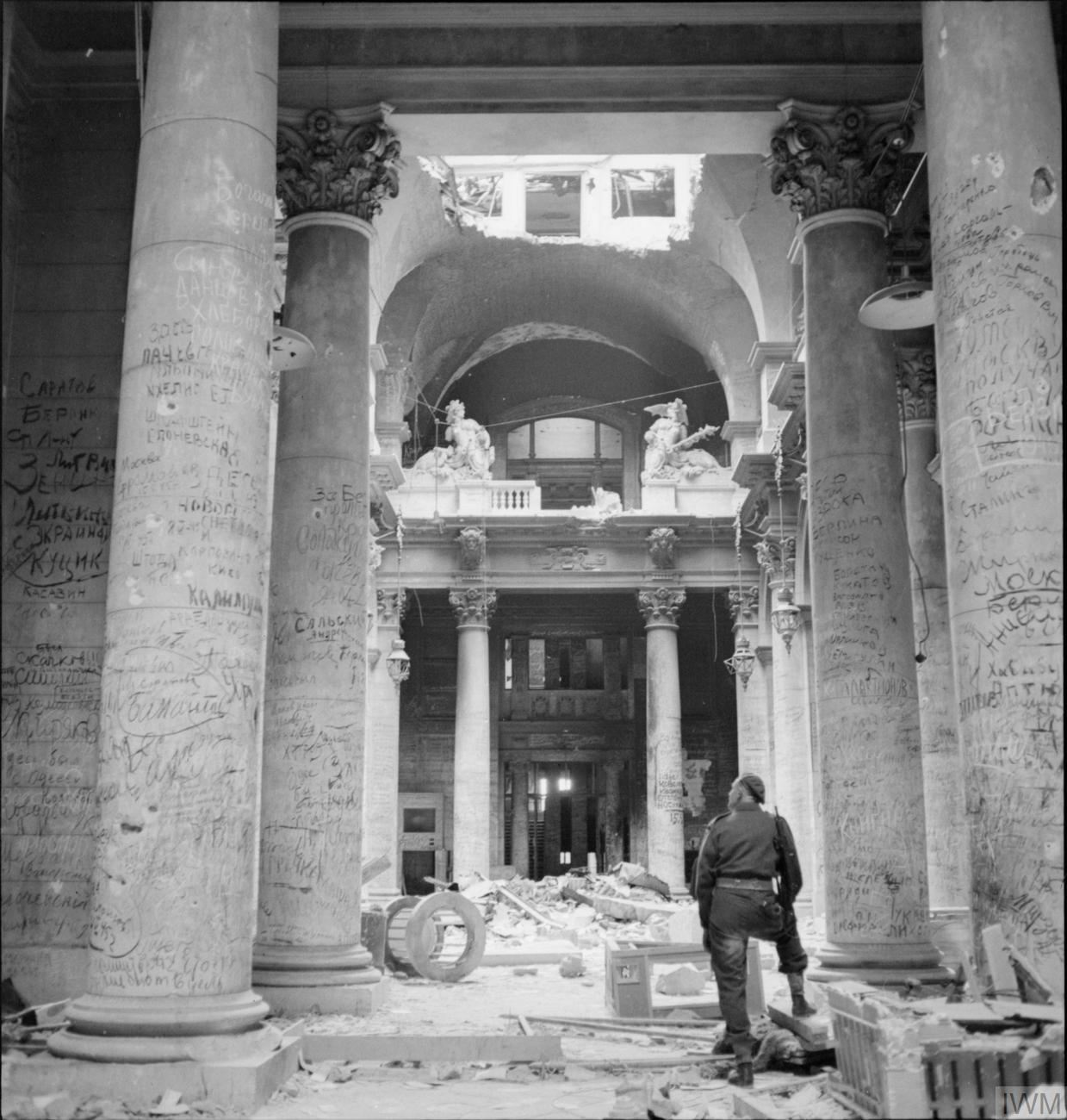
Soviet Army graffiti in the ruins of the Reichstag, in Berlin (1945)

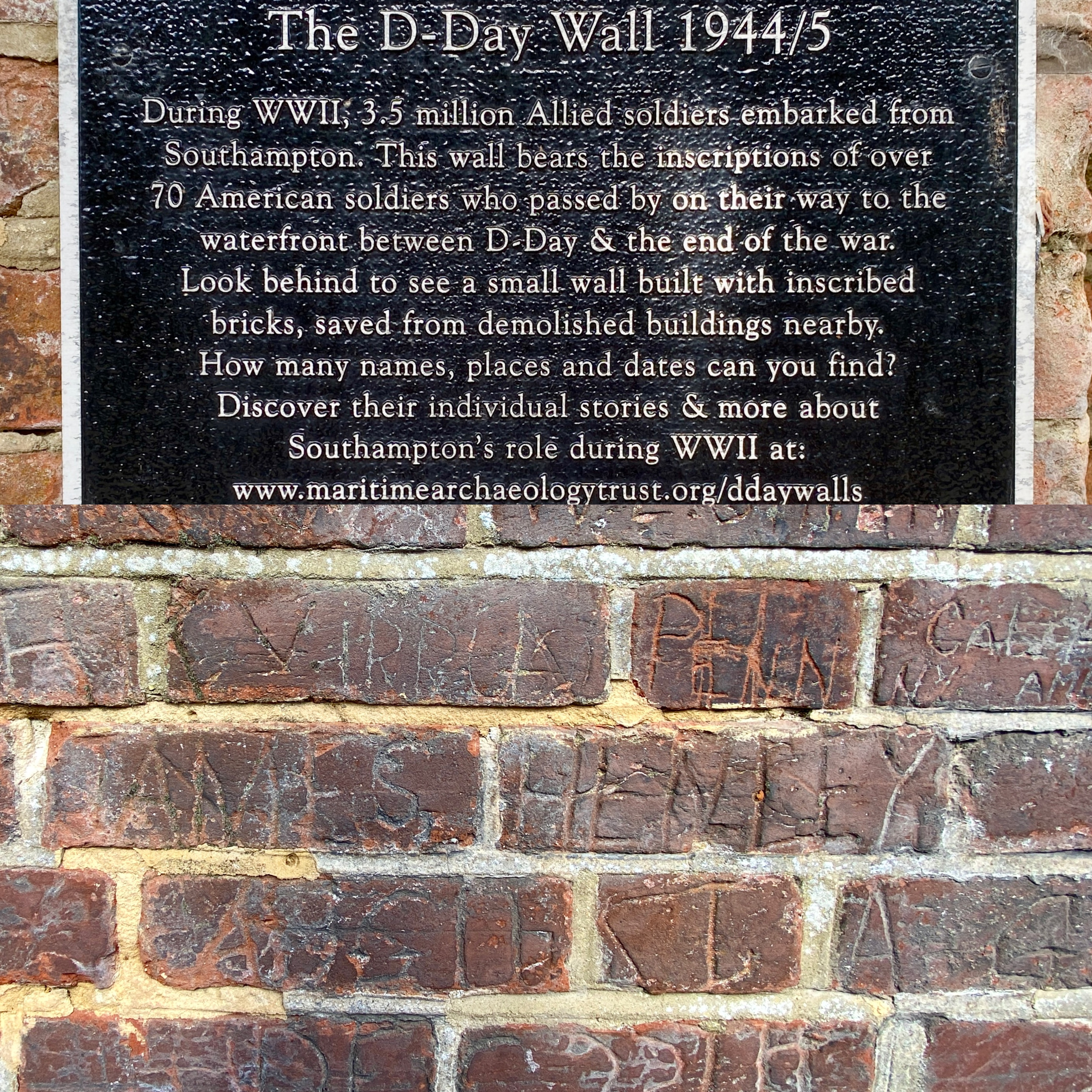
The D-Day Wall in Western Esplanade, Southampton

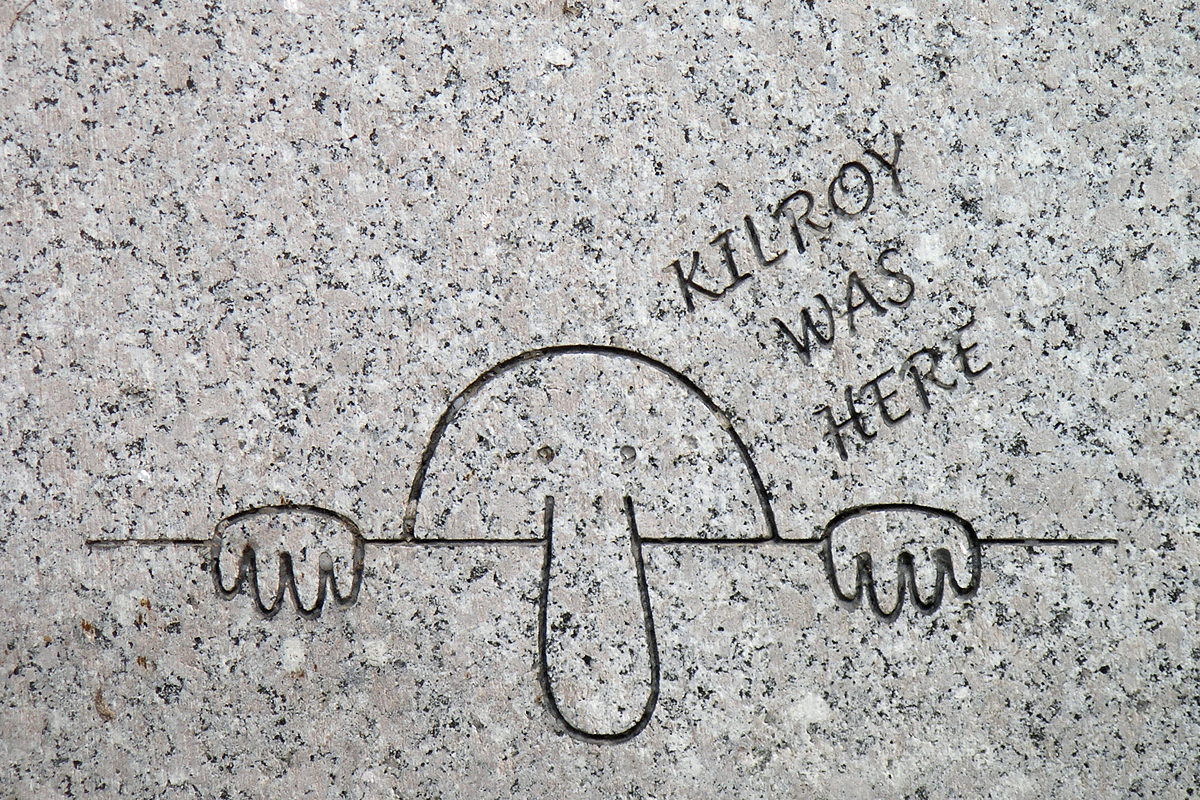
Permanent engraving of Kilroy on the World War II Memorial, in Washington, D.C.
Early spray-painted graffiti

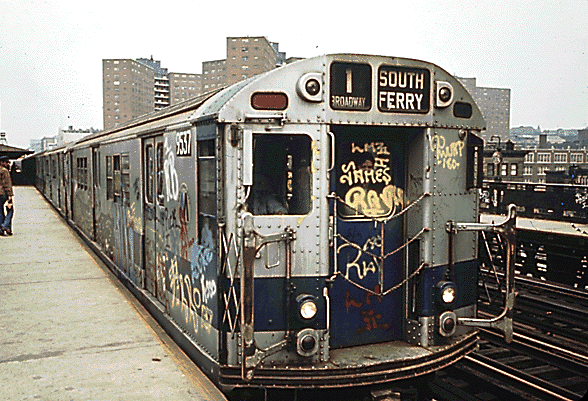
New York City Subway train covered in graffiti (1973)

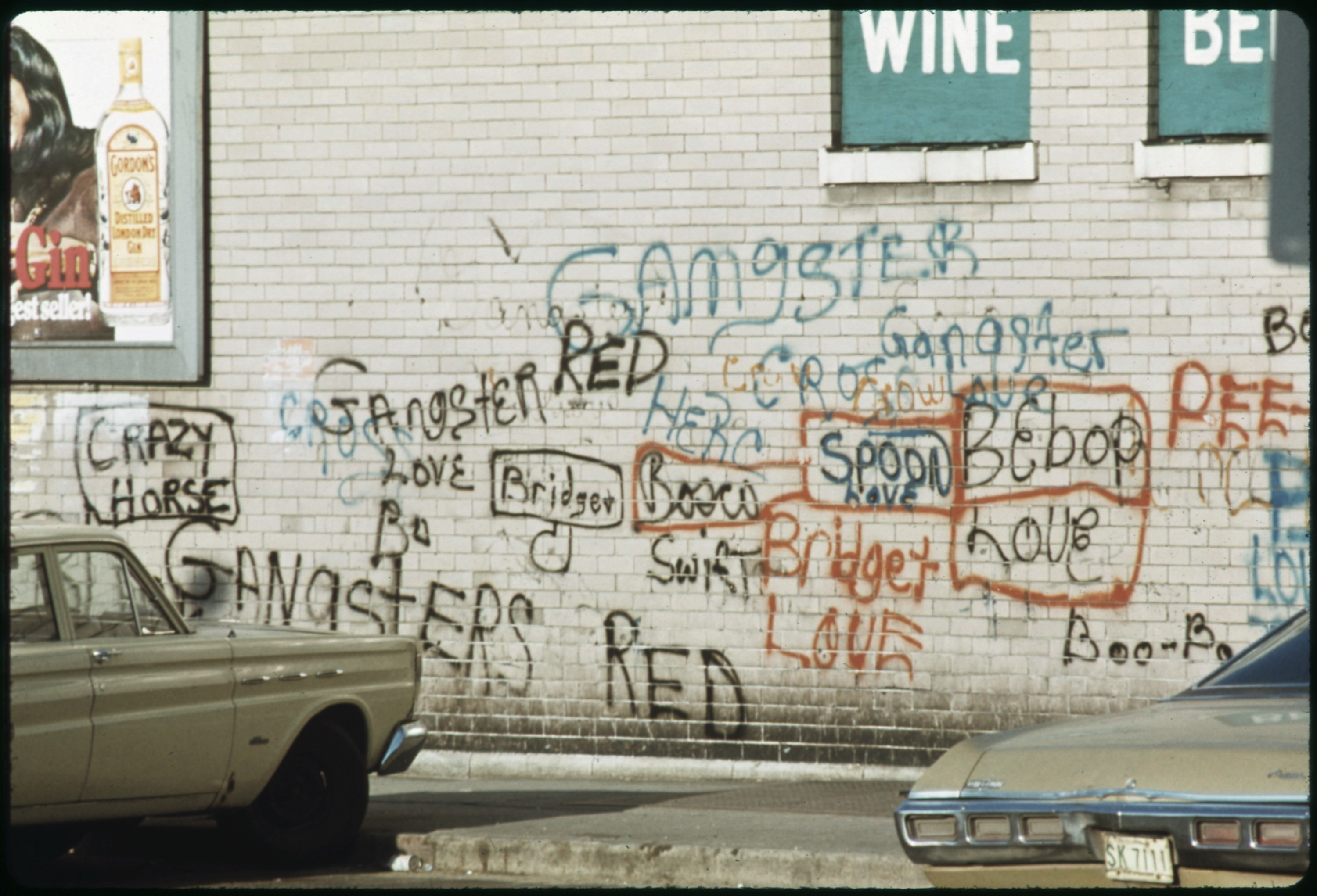
Graffiti in Chicago (1973)

=== Modern ===
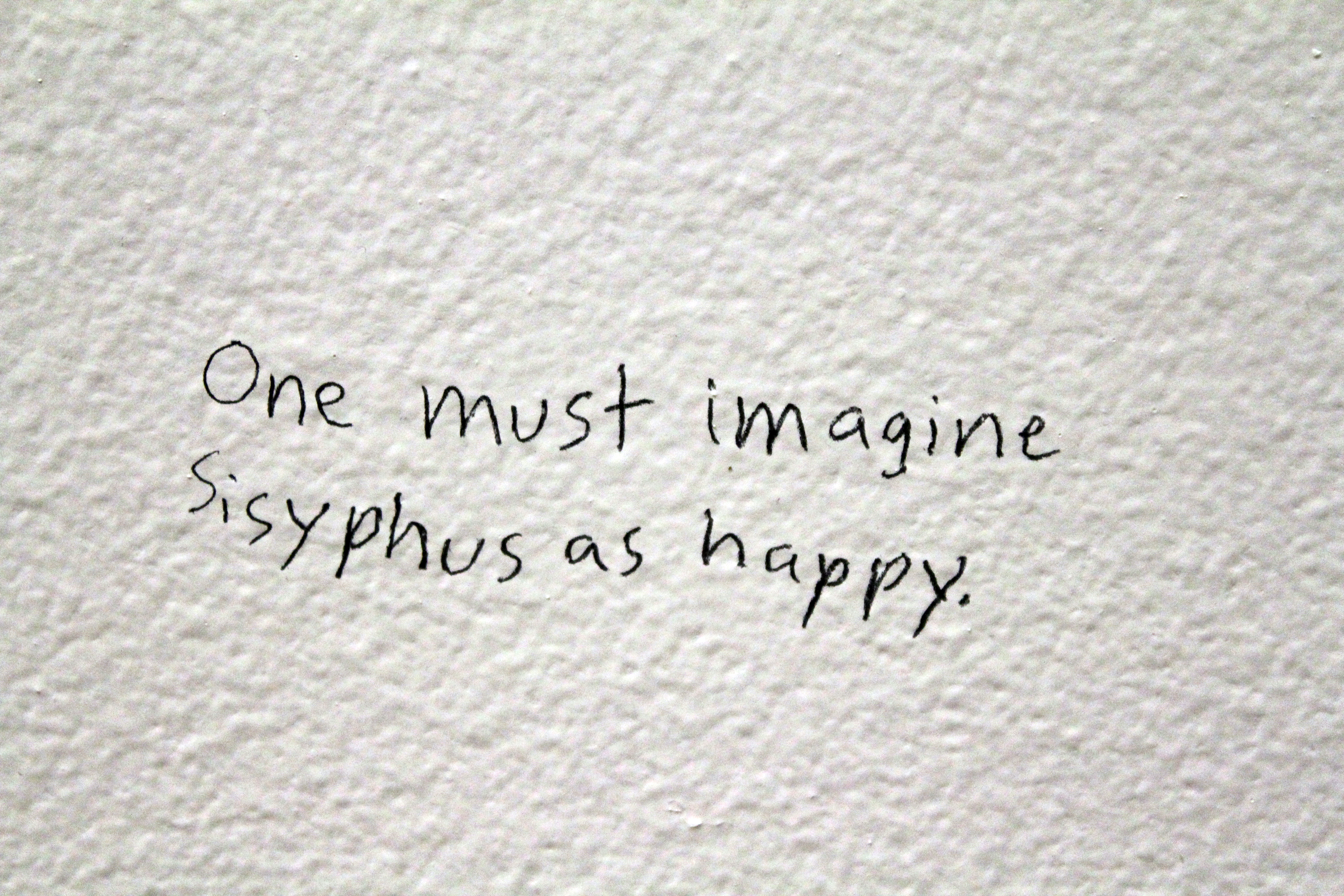
The quote "One must imagine Sisyphus as [sic] happy." written on a wall, after an essay by Albert Camus

Modern graffiti style has been heavily influenced by hip-hop culture and started with young people in the 1960s and 70s in New York City and Philadelphia. Tags were the first form of stylised contemporary graffiti, starting with artists like TAKI 183 and Cornbread. Later, artists began to paint throw-ups and pieces on trains on the sides of subway trains and eventually moved into the city after the NYC metro began to buy new trains and paint over graffiti.

While the art had many advocates and appreciators—including the cultural critic Norman Mailer—others, including New York City mayor Ed Koch, considered it to be defacement of public property, and saw it as a form of public blight. While those who did early modern graffiti called it "writing", the 1974 essay The Faith of Graffiti referred to it using the term "graffiti", which stuck.

An early graffito outside of New York or Philadelphia was the inscription in London reading "Clapton is God" in reference to the guitarist Eric Clapton. The phrase was spray-painted by an admirer on a wall in Islington, north London, in the autumn of 1967. The graffito was captured in a photograph, in which a dog is urinating on the wall.

Films like Style Wars in the 80s depicting famous writers such as Skeme, DONDI, MinOne, and ZEPHYR reinforced graffiti's role within New York's emerging hip-hop culture. Although many officers of the New York City Police Department found this film to be controversial, Style Wars is still recognized as the most prolific film representation of what was going on within the young hip-hop culture of the early 1980s. Fab 5 Freddy and Futura 2000 took hip-hop graffiti to Paris and London as part of the New York City Rap Tour in 1983.

=== Commercialization and pop culture ===
With the popularity and legitimization of graffiti has come a level of commercialization. In 2001, computer giant IBM launched an advertising campaign in Chicago and San Francisco which involved people spray painting on sidewalks a peace symbol, a heart, and Tux (Linux penguin mascot), to represent "Peace, Love, and Linux." IBM paid Chicago and San Francisco collectively US$120,000 for punitive damages and clean-up costs.

In 2005, a similar ad campaign was launched by Sony and executed by its advertising agency in New York, Chicago, Atlanta, Philadelphia, Los Angeles, and Miami, to market its handheld PlayStation Portable (PSP) gaming system. In this campaign, taking notice of the legal problems of the IBM campaign, Sony paid building owners for the rights to paint on their buildings "a collection of dizzy-eyed urban kids playing with the PSP as if it were a skateboard, a paddle, or a rocking horse".

== Global movements ==
When graffiti is done as an art form, it often uses the Latin script even in countries where it is not the primary writing system. English words are also often used as monikers.

=== Africa ===
In the early 1990s, Amadou Lamine Ngom, known as Docta, worked to publicize graffiti and street art in Africa. Graffiti quickly became a way for artists to raise awareness about social, political, and environmental issues. Murals of venerated figures began to appear to encourage people to not litter near the murals. Festivals such as FESTIGRAFF in Dakar, Senegal, promote artists and experimentation.

==== South Africa ====
Graffiti has become an important part of post-apartheid South African culture, with many works being a result of implemented by-laws that legalize graffiti and street art, such as murals and installations, in public spaces and even being promoted as tourist attractions. Cape Town is one of the most recognized areas for graffiti in South Africa, having a background for it in the 1980s when racial discrimination and segregation had become so prominent that the people began to find ways to express these struggles in larger scales. It became a way to share demands against the injustices that they were witnessing against black and colored communities, and Cape Town continues to be a place for these voices to be heard, as they are currently fighting for issues like over gentrification.

Specifically in Claremont, Cape Town, four mediums would be primarily used: “koki” or fibre-tipped pen would be the most used with a 51% found distribution, spray paint being 46%, stickers 3% and paint being the least at 1%.

==== Senegal ====
In Dakar, Soly Cisse, a 1996 graduate from the Ecole Nationale des Beaux-Arts, is an artist who has taken inspiration from graffiti and has translated its visual concepts into his paintings and installation work.

=== Europe ===
By the 1980s, American graffiti and hiphop had begun to become more widespread on the European graffiti scene, and at that time in the 80's American graffiti was most closely associated with the punk rock scene. By the 1990s new styles of modern graffiti had reached Eastern Europe and by the late 1990s all European countries had graffiti scenes. Contemporary social and political issues have a major influence on what occurs in graffiti scenes in many countries and this can be seen in countries such as Portugal, Germany, and England.

In the early 1980s Blek le Rat was one of the first stencil graffiti artists in Europe to begin creating stencil art on the streets of Paris and he began by creating stencils of rats and it has been commented that prior to this "...graffiti was still largely dominated by lettering and tags inspired by the New York subway movement, Blek introduced figurative stencil art to the streets of Europe. His intervention proved revolutionary. The stencil allowed complex images to be executed rapidly, reducing the time spent illegally painting in public spaces while making the work instantly recognizable. Banksy would later adopt and refine this very technique, turning it into one of the defining visual languages of contemporary street art."

Street art festivals are also present in Europe with UpFest in Bristol, England, and the East Side Gallery in Berlin, Germany and some of the earliest graffiti exhibitions outside of the USA were in Amsterdam, The Netherlands.

==== Germany ====
In 1996 a new graffiti project was created in Munich which allowed people to create graffiti underneath the Brudermühl bridge once or twice a year. It began as a project of the Färberei art space and Munich City Youth Council and Munich had been a major center for graffiti culture in Europe since the early 1980s. This image shows a graffiti mural by "Mitch" under the Brudermühl bridge which was first created in 1996 and since then it has been preserved.

The outer brick wall alongside the "Old Slaughterhouse" on Tumblinger street is the longest legal graffiti wall in Munich and "...since the mid-80s it has been a popular meeting place for artists and since the early '90s it has become an internationally known legal hall of fame. Regular spray events such as the 'Neujahresverchromung'..." also take place there. Photo taken 2019

In 1983 in Munich tags and pieces began to appear on streets with most of them either experimental works or references to famous sprayers from New York such as "Z-Roc", "Mitch" and "Ray". Also in 1983, Munich saw the emergence of a small hip-hop and breakdancing scene that after gaining attention from the media began to also draw teenagers towards graffiti. The graffiti artist "Ray" or "Ray X" was one of the first people to begin creating graffiti at this time in 1983 and he is known for his character of a "humorous or satirical dog" that was often used for social critticism. He would place his graffiti in hard to reach spots all over Munich and in 1985 he sprayed an astronaut character on the concrete support pylon of the 30 metre high Großhesseloher bridge in the south of Munich.

In 1986 the European Graffiti Union was created to help establish more public spaces in Munich and elsewhere where people could go and create legal graffiti as well as helping to create new commisions for graffiti artists and supporting the graffiti scene in Munich in general. The EGU was also one of the organisations involved in enabling Tumblinger street and the many walls surrounding the Feierwerk compound on Heimeranplatz to become a hub for the graffiti scene in Munich and "...since the mid-80s it has been a popular meeting place for artists and since the early '90s it has become an internationally known legal hall of fame. Regular spray events such as the Neujahresverchromung take place in the Tumblinger street... ...with local and international artists" attending the events. The outer brick wall of the Old Slaughterhouse on Tumblinger street is the longest legal graffiti wall in Munich which also has large amounts of graffiti on the buildings and shipping containers adjacent to it.

The Bahnwärter Thiel cultural centre located on the site of the former "Slaughterhouse" contains multiple workspaces for use by both graffiti artists and street artists. It also has a 100 m (330 ft) wooden wall that is designated as a space where people can create graffiti.

Since 2015 the Bahnwärter Thiel club and cultural project in Munich has had spaces that both street artists and graffiti artists are able to use such as studios, rehearsal spaces, open workspaces, and workshops. A wooden wall with a length of 100 m (330 ft) was also constructed at the Bahnwärter Thiel by staff, the City of Munich, and members of the graffiti scene and it is designated as a space for people to create graffiti. The site first opened as Bahnwärter-Kulturstätten or "culture site" in 2015, on the grounds of the former "Slaughterhouse" and then Bahnwärter Thiel opened later the same year.

In 1988 the first graffiti exhibition subsidized by the city of Munich and organised by the European Graffiti Union took place on Lothringer street in Munich and it featured work from many graffiti artists including Darco, Skel, Won, Zeal and Mitch. In 1995 another graffiti exhibition “Graffiti Munich” was held in the Pasinger Fabrik cultural centre, and a book “Graffiti Art 3: Writing in Munich” was published in conjunction with the exhibition and along with the books predecessor, “Graffiti Art 2: Southern Germany and Switzerland”, the books helped to record numerous works on the Munich graffiti scene. In 1996 the Kallmann museum in Munich hosted a graffiti exhibition that was also accompanied by a graffiti book "Theory of Style – The Liberation of the Alphabet" which was also written by graffiti artists.

In 1996 a new graffiti project called "ISART" began in Munich that allowed people to create graffiti underneath the Brudermühl bridge one or twice a year and it was commented at that time in 1996 that "Right now, you can see that acceptance of graffiti is growing. We played here over the weekend... ...and people come by and think it’s great. That’s actually the reason it was legalized here because people realize that it’s something that doesn’t harm the city but can actually enhance it, especially given its sometimes bleak appearance."

The Färberei art space along with Munich City Youth Council first helped to organise the "ISART" graffiti project and it has been commented that it was "...an extreme rarity in Munich at the time, even though Munich had been a major center for graffiti culture in Europe since the early 1980s. The project's focus was to bring graffiti out of illegality and make it visible as artworks in public spaces...".

The Berlin based graffiti crew 1UP, have gained widespread visibillity in Berlin, Athens and other cities around the world and they take a collective approach to creating graffiti with numerous people involved in its creation. Their tags are located in prominent and hard to reach places and their tags are also sometimes created by other people on their own who are not associated with the Berlin based crew.

A mural on the side of the Brudermühl bridge in Munich created as part of the legal graffiti project ISART, which started in 1996 and since 2024 has been called "Can Opener".

A mural on the side of an apartment building in Berlin created as a part of the 2019 Berlin Mural Fest by the Berlin based graffiti crew 1UP.

Arabic graffiti art on a wall in Jayyous, Palestine. Its English translation reads: "We are all for the nation, we are all resistance, we are all martyrs."

=== Middle East ===
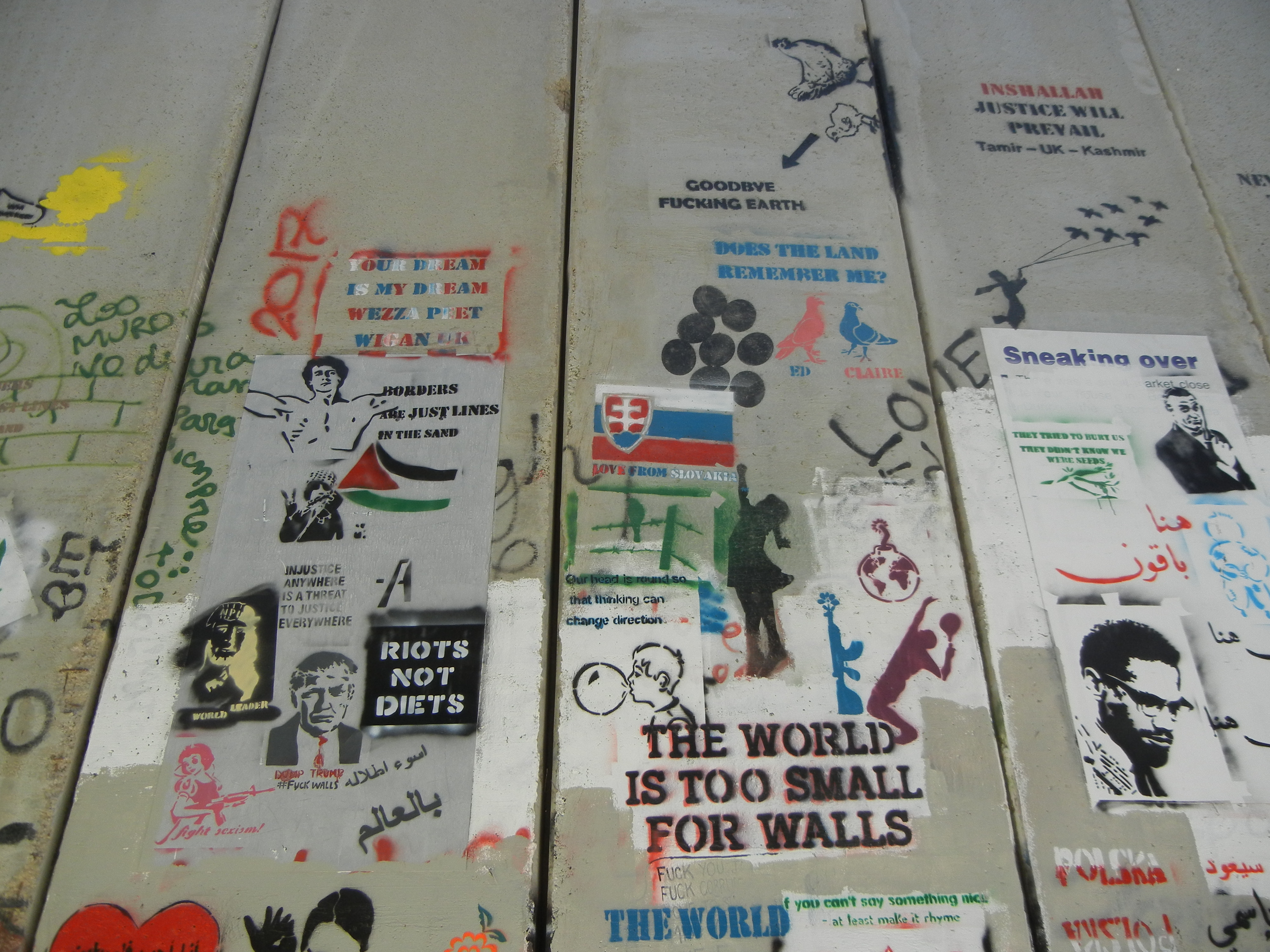
Graffiti on the barrier wall in the West Bank.

Graffiti in the Middle East has emerged slowly, with taggers operating in Egypt, Lebanon, the Gulf countries like Bahrain or the United Arab Emirates, Israel, and in Iran. The major Iranian newspaper Hamshahri has published two articles on illegal writers in the city with photographic coverage of Iranian artist A1one's works on Tehran walls. Tokyo-based design magazine, PingMag, has interviewed A1one and featured photographs of his work. The Israeli West Bank barrier has become a site for graffiti, reminiscent in this sense of the Berlin Wall. Many writers in Israel come from other places around the globe, such as JUIF from Los Angeles and DEVIONE from London. The religious reference "נ נח נחמ נחמן מאומן" ("Na Nach Nachma Nachman Meuman") is commonly seen in graffiti around Israel.

Graffiti has played an important role within the street art scene in the Middle East and North Africa (MENA), especially following the events of the Arab Spring of 2011 or the Sudanese Revolution of 2018/19. Graffiti is a tool of expression in the context of conflict in the region, allowing people to raise their voices politically and socially. Famous street artist Banksy has had an important effect in the street art scene in the MENA area, especially in Palestine where some of his works are located in the West Bank barrier and Bethlehem.

=== South America ===
South America has a very active graffiti culture, and graffiti are very common in Brazilian cities. This is blamed on the high uneven distribution of income, changing laws, and disenfranchisement. Pichação is a form of graffiti found in Brazil, which involves tall characters and is usually used as a form of protest. It contrasts with the more conventionally artistic values of the practitioners of grafite.

Prominent Brazilian writers include Os Gêmeos, Boleta, Nunca, Nina, Speto, Tikka, and T.Freak.

=== Southeast Asia ===
There are also a large number of graffiti influences in Southeast Asian countries that mostly come from modern Western culture, such as Malaysia, where graffiti have long been a common sight in Malaysia's capital city, Kuala Lumpur. Since 2010, the country has begun hosting a street festival to encourage all generations and people from all walks of life to enjoy and encourage Malaysian street culture.

Graffiti around the world

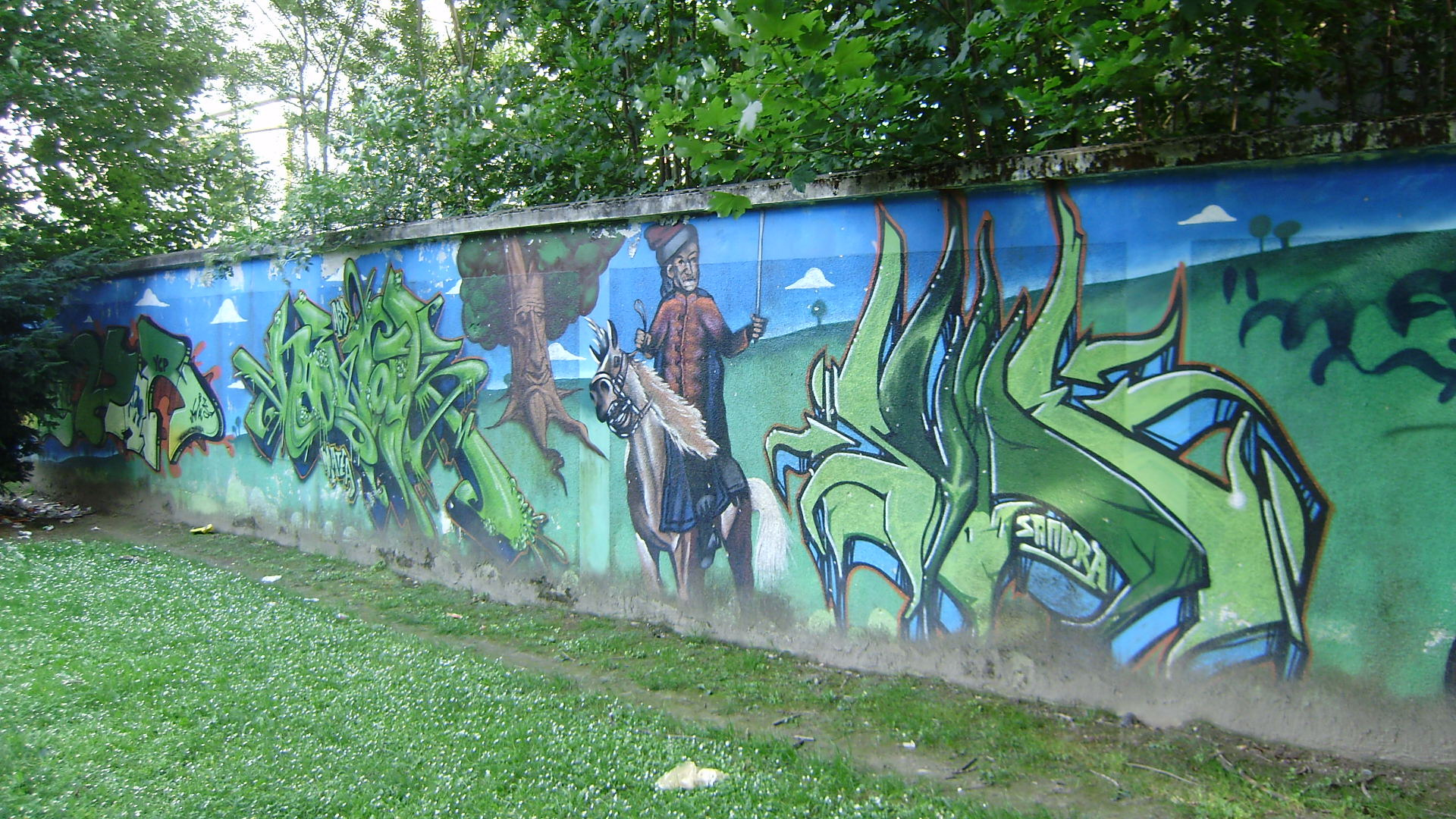
Graffiti on a wall in Čakovec, Croatia

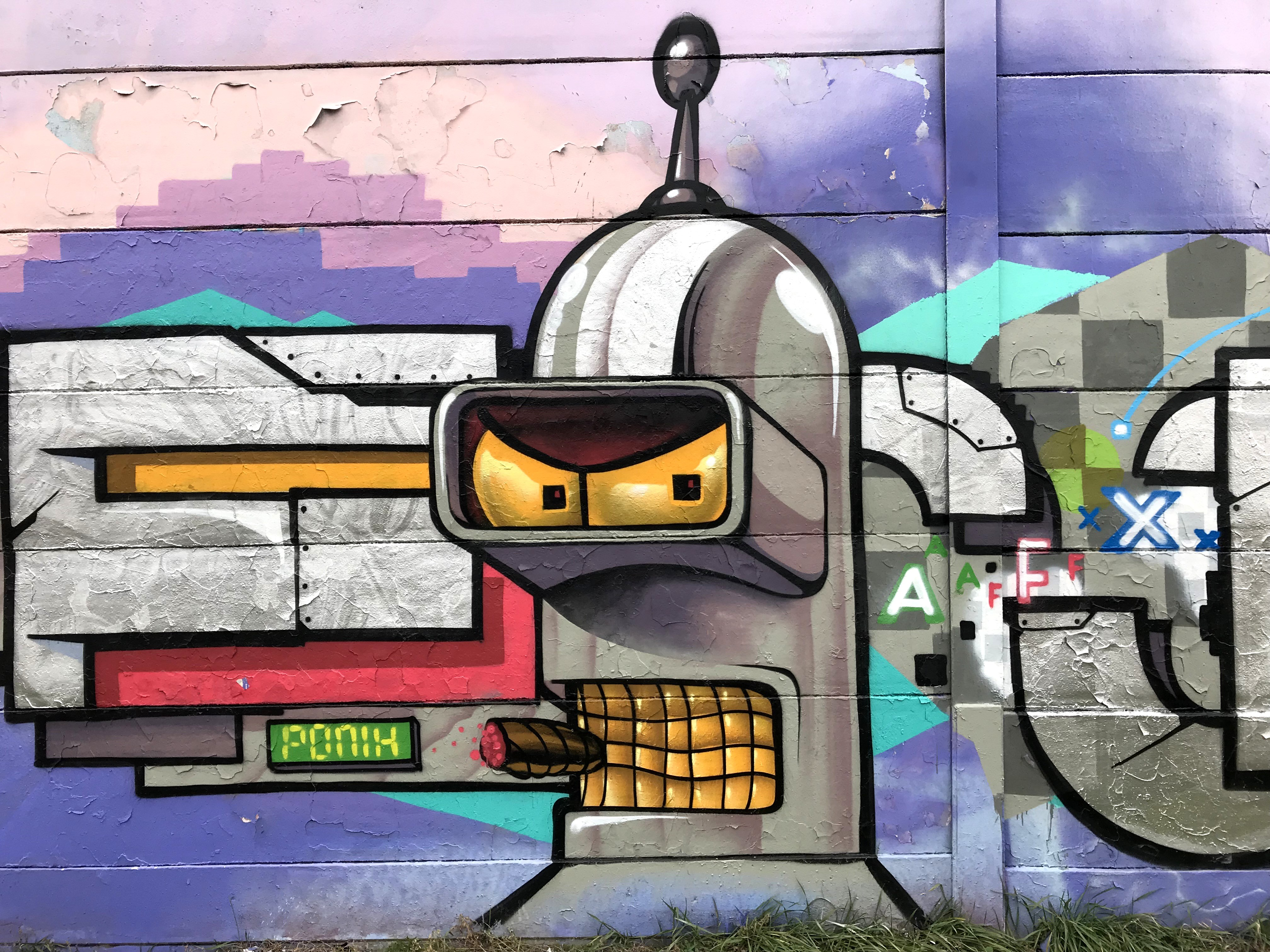
Graffiti of the character Bender on a wall in Budapest, Hungary

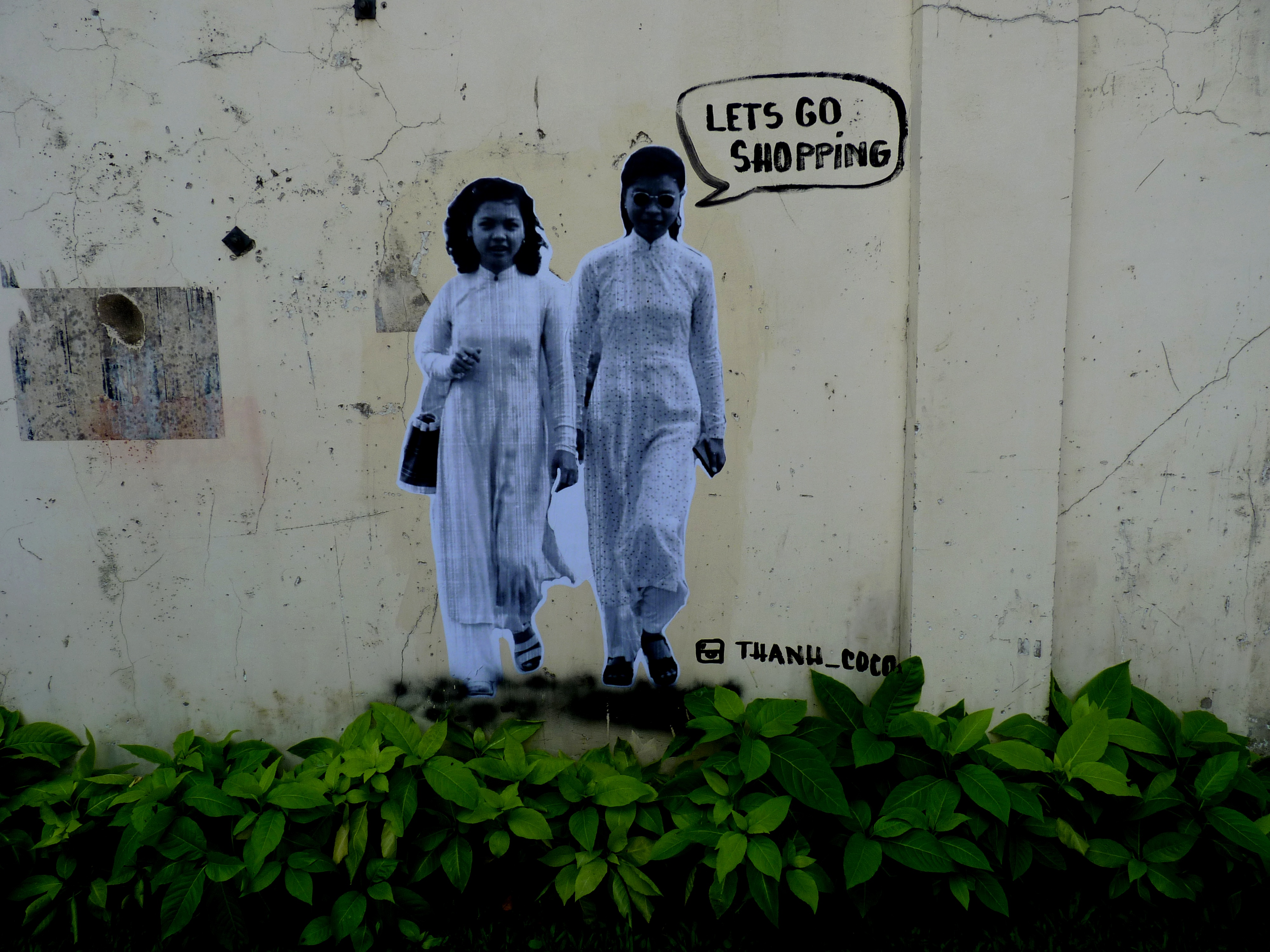
Graffiti in Ho Chi Minh City, Vietnam

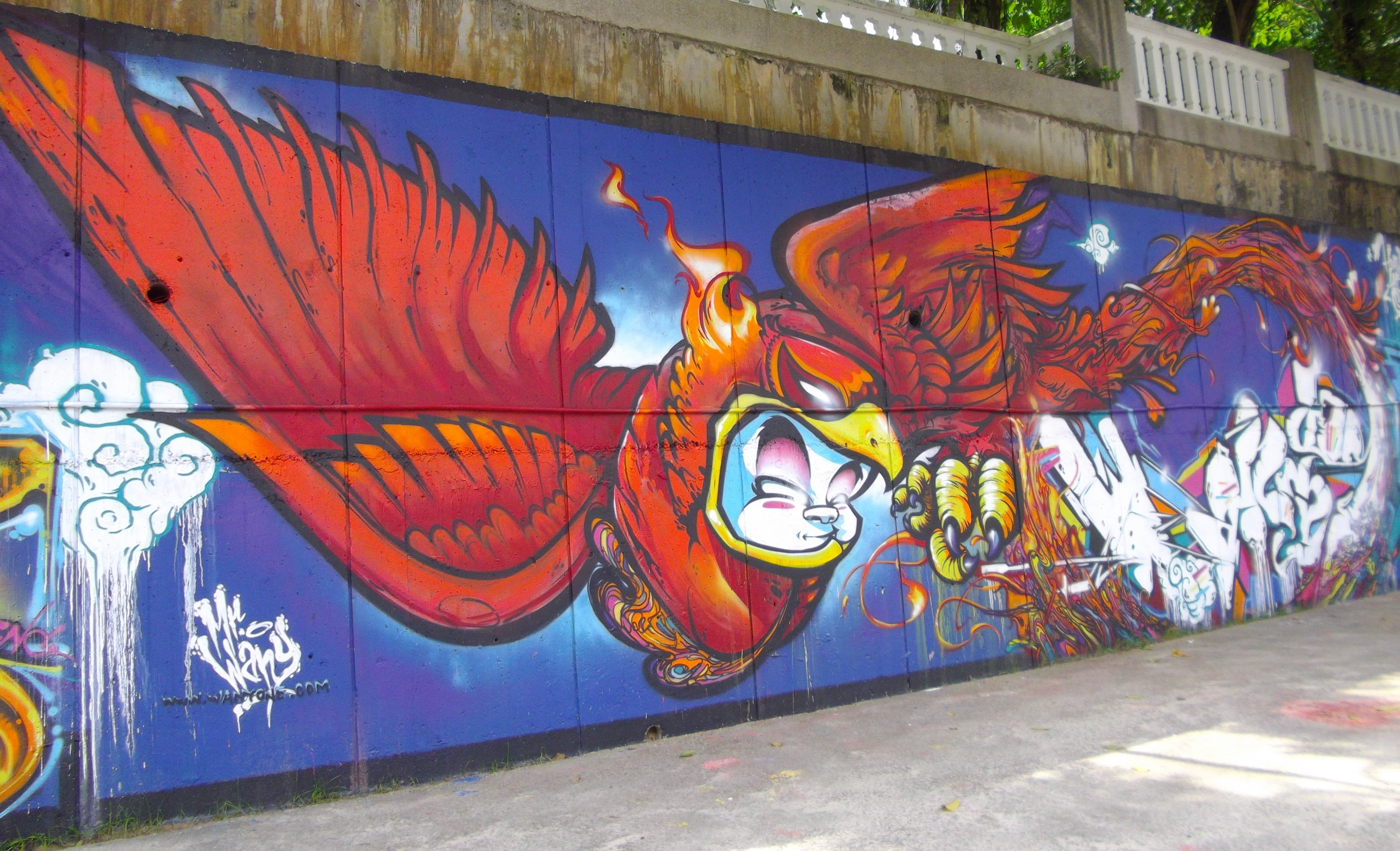
Graffiti art in Kuala Lumpur, Malaysia

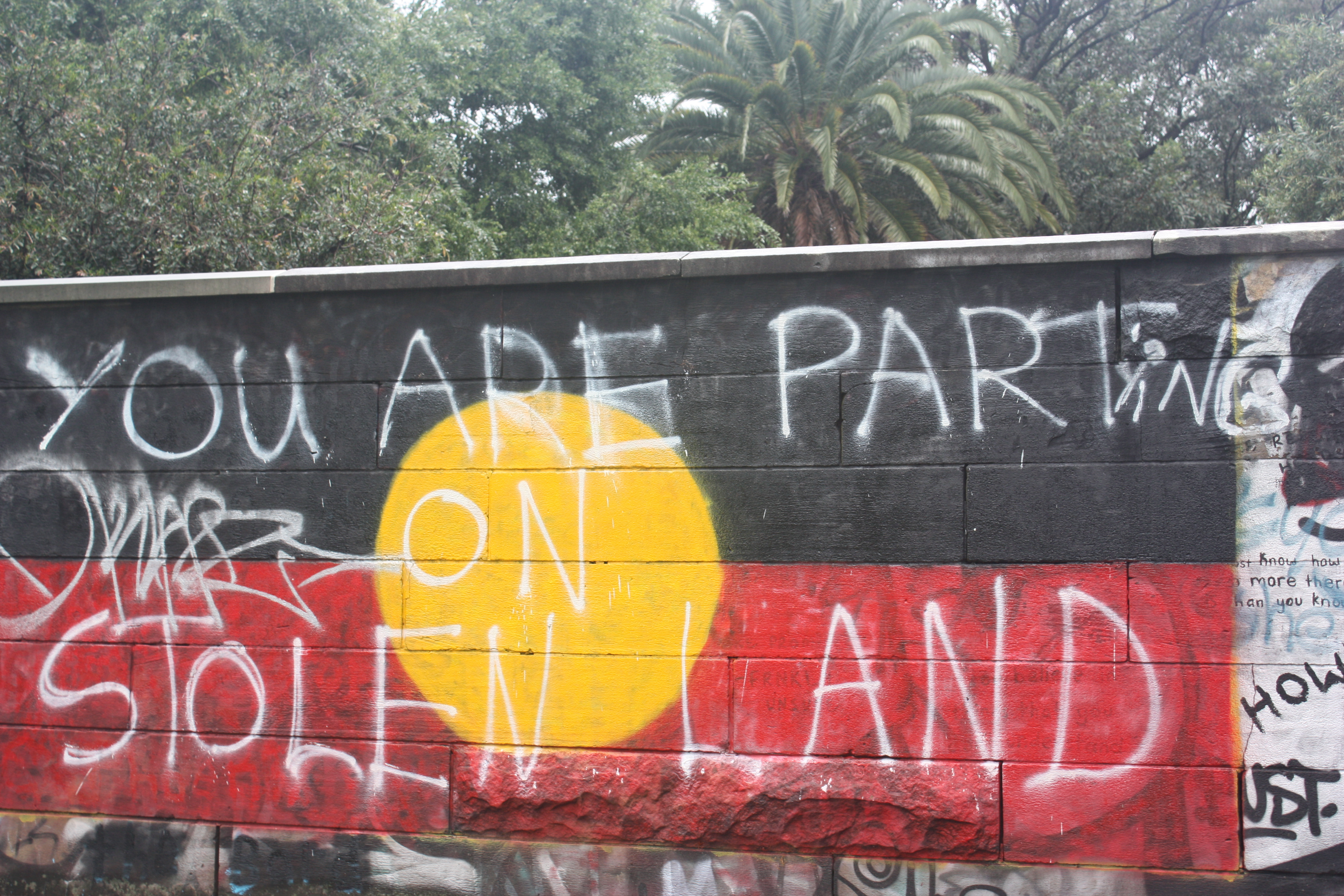
Graffiti on a park wall in Sydney, Australia

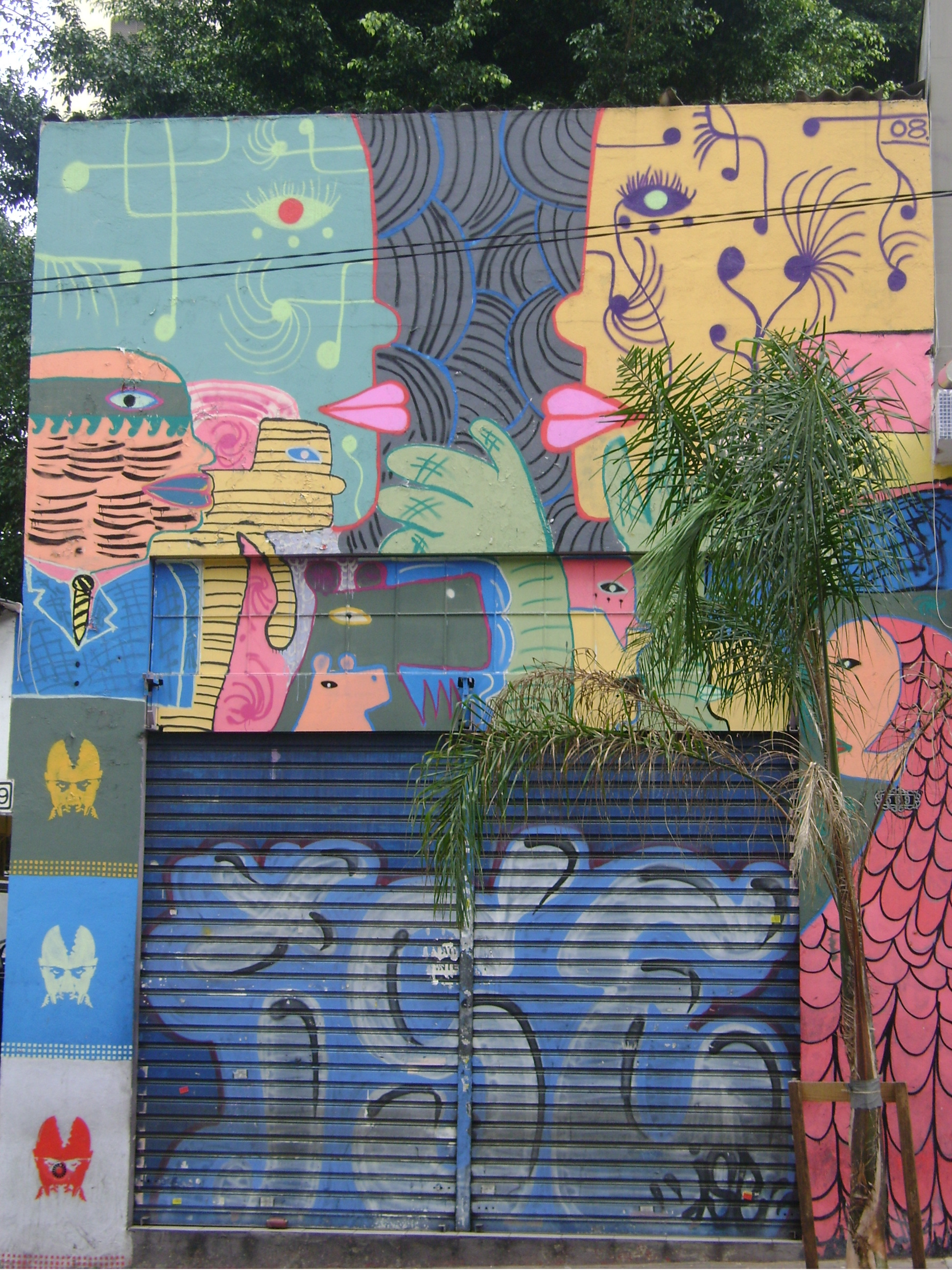
Graffiti in São Paulo, Brazil

== Types ==
=== Tools ===
Spray paint and markers are the main tools used for tagging, throw ups, and pieces. Paint markers, paint dabbers, and scratching tools are also used. Some art companies, such as Montana Colors, make art supplies specifically for graffiti and street art. Many major cities have graffiti art stores.

Graffiti making

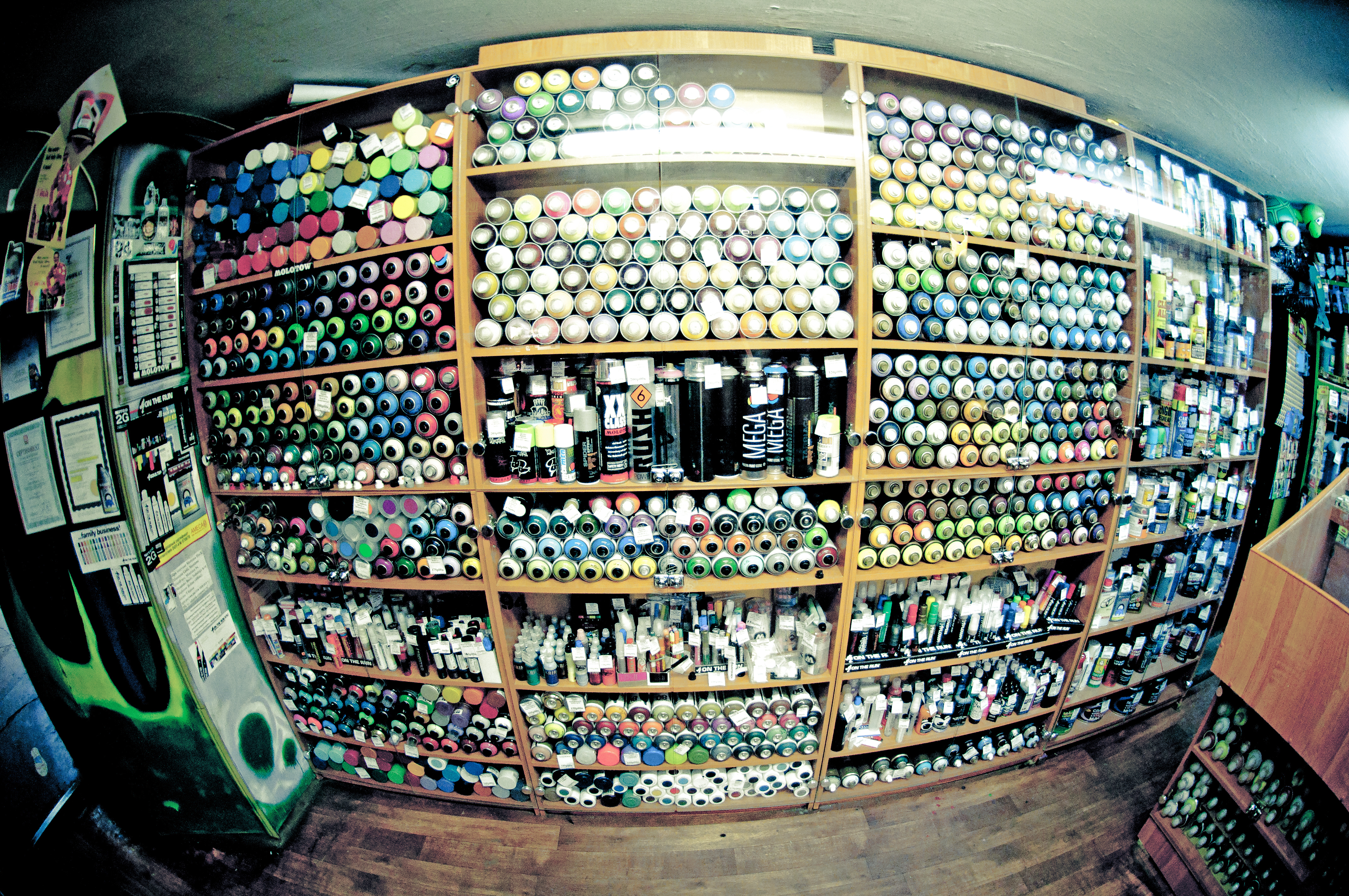
The first graffiti shop in Russia was opened in 1992 in Tver. (Photo taken in 2011)

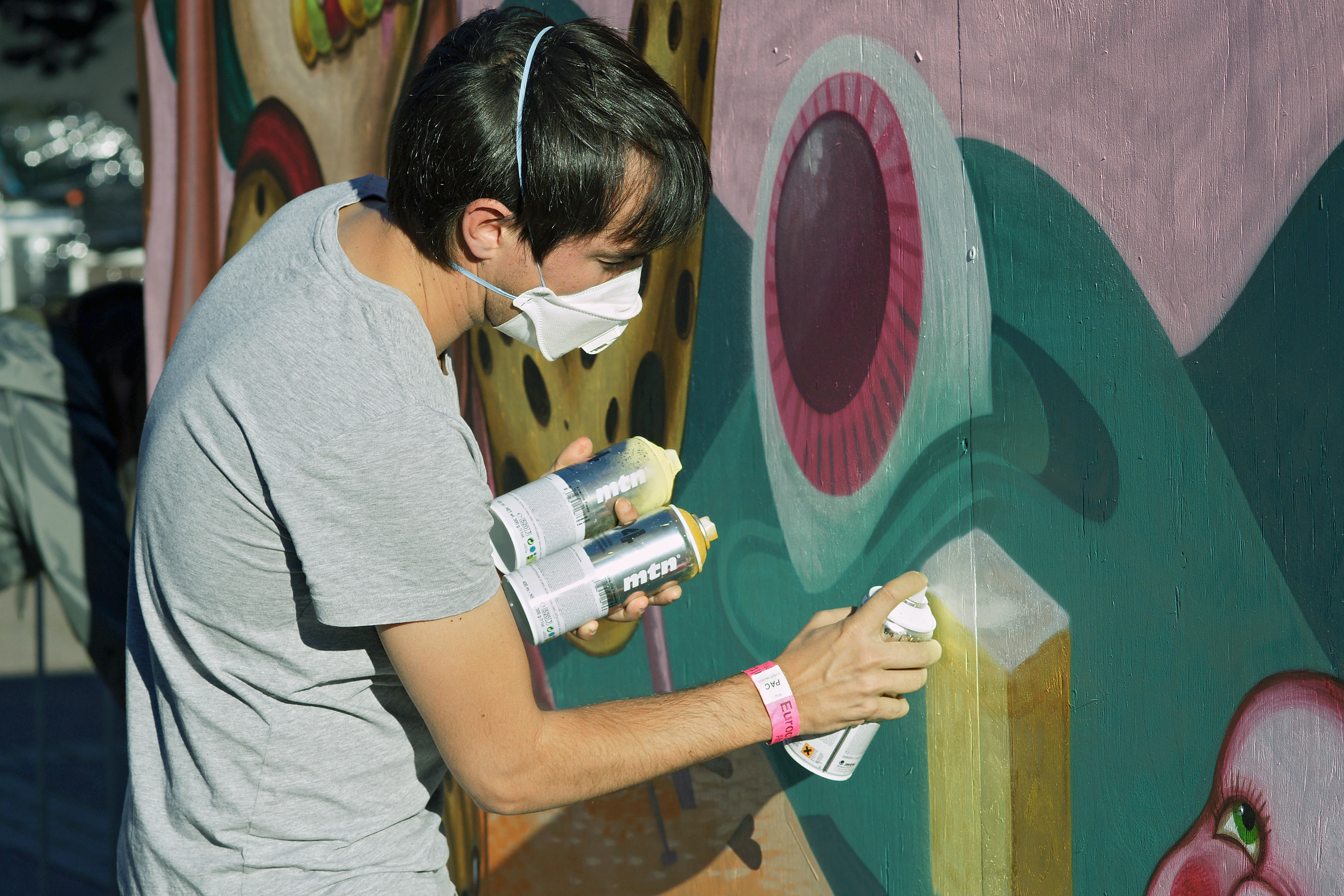
Graffiti application at Eurofestival in Turku, Finland. (2012)

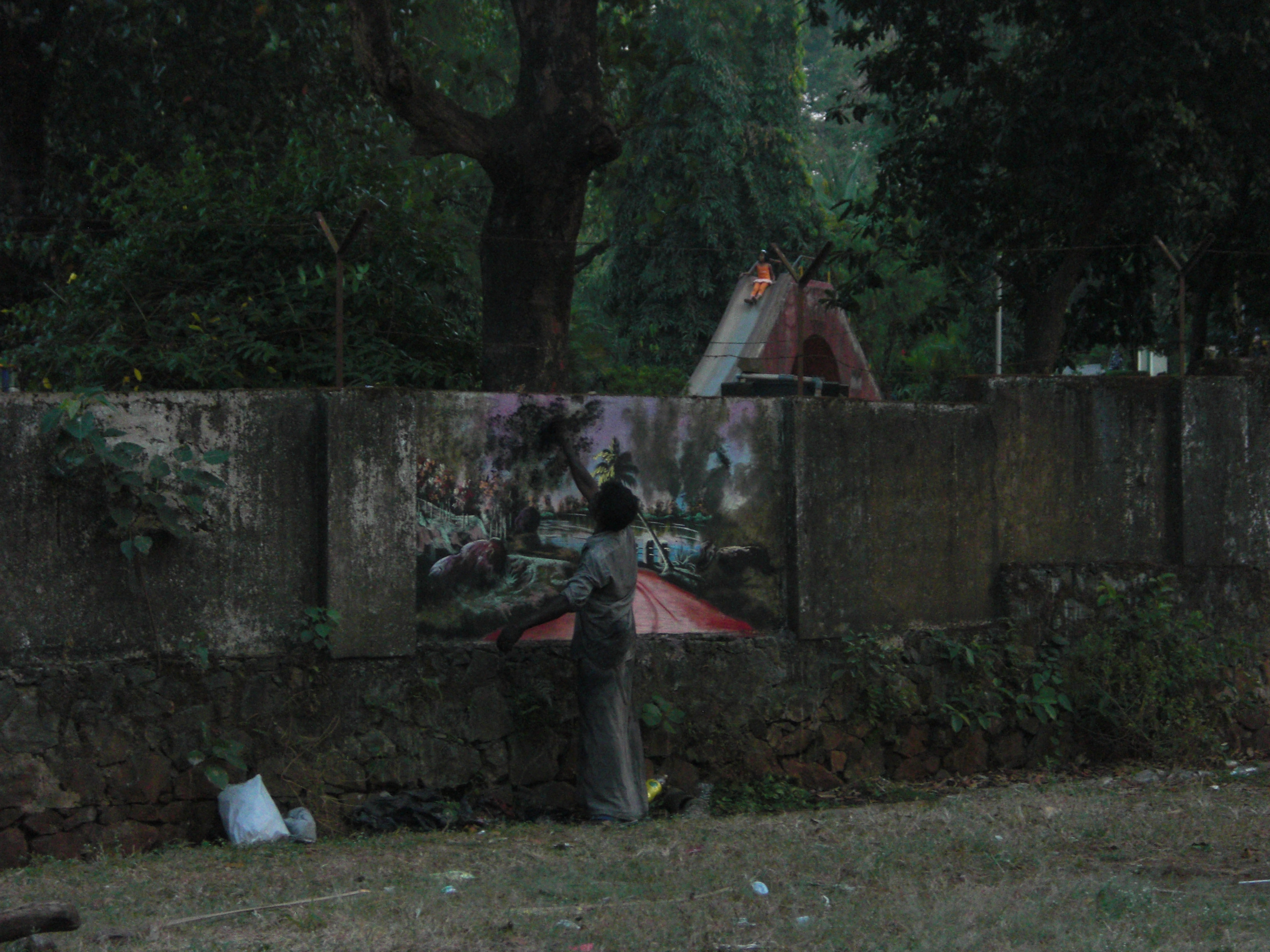
Graffiti application in India using natural pigments (mostly charcoal, plant saps, and dirt). (2011)

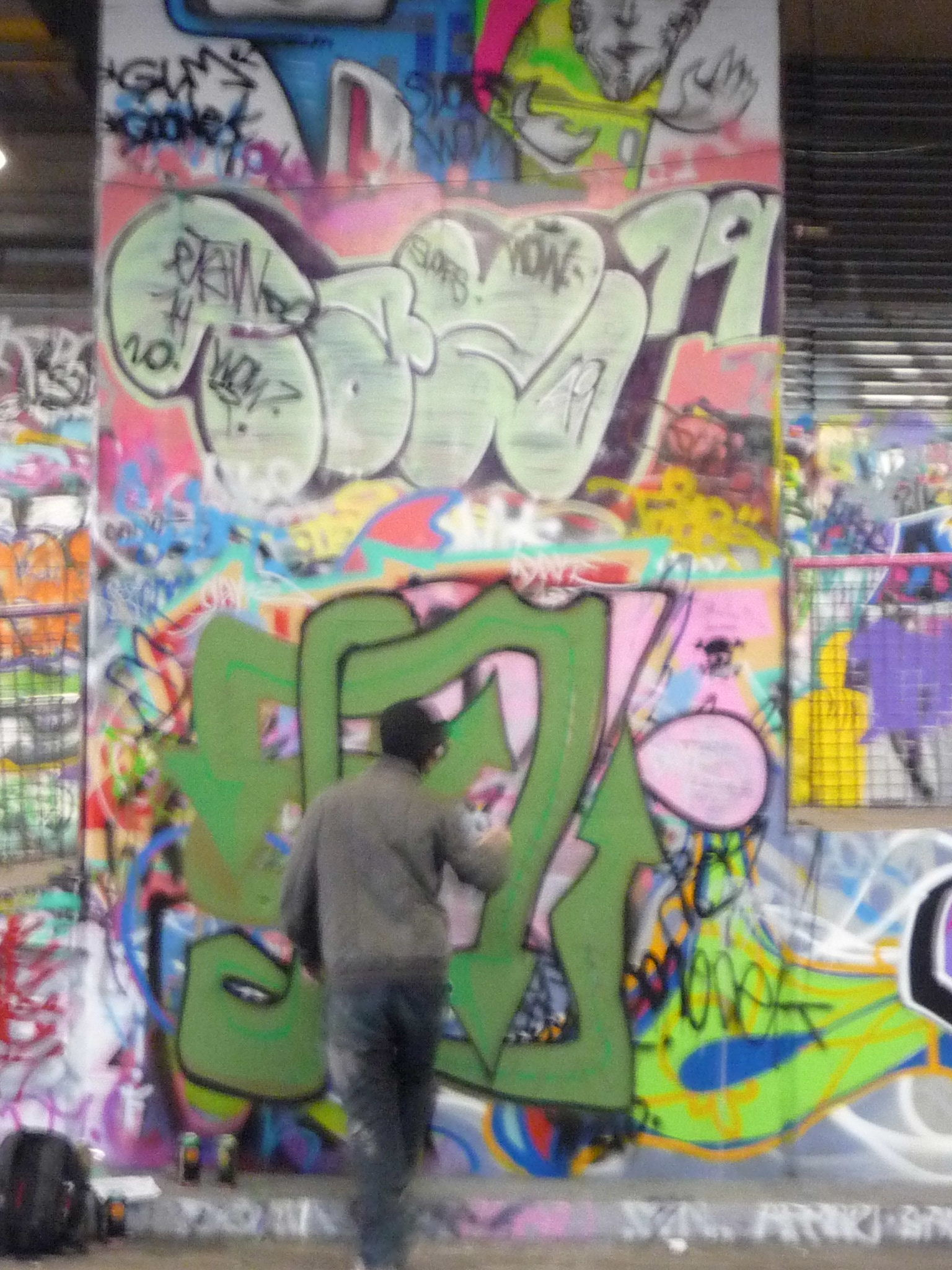
A graffiti artist creating graffiti in the Leake st tunnel underneath Waterloo station in London. (2009)

=== Stencil graffiti ===
Stencil graffiti is created by cutting out shapes and designs in a stiff material (such as cardboard or subject folders) to form an overall design or image. The stencil is then placed on the "canvas" and sprayed with an aerosol can, the image begins to appear on the intended surface. Some of the first examples were created in 1981 by artists Blek le Rat in Paris, in 1982 by Jef Aerosol in Tours (France); by 1985 stencils had appeared in other cities including New York City, Sydney, and Melbourne, where they were documented by American photographer Charles Gatewood and Australian photographer Rennie Ellis.

=== Stickers ===
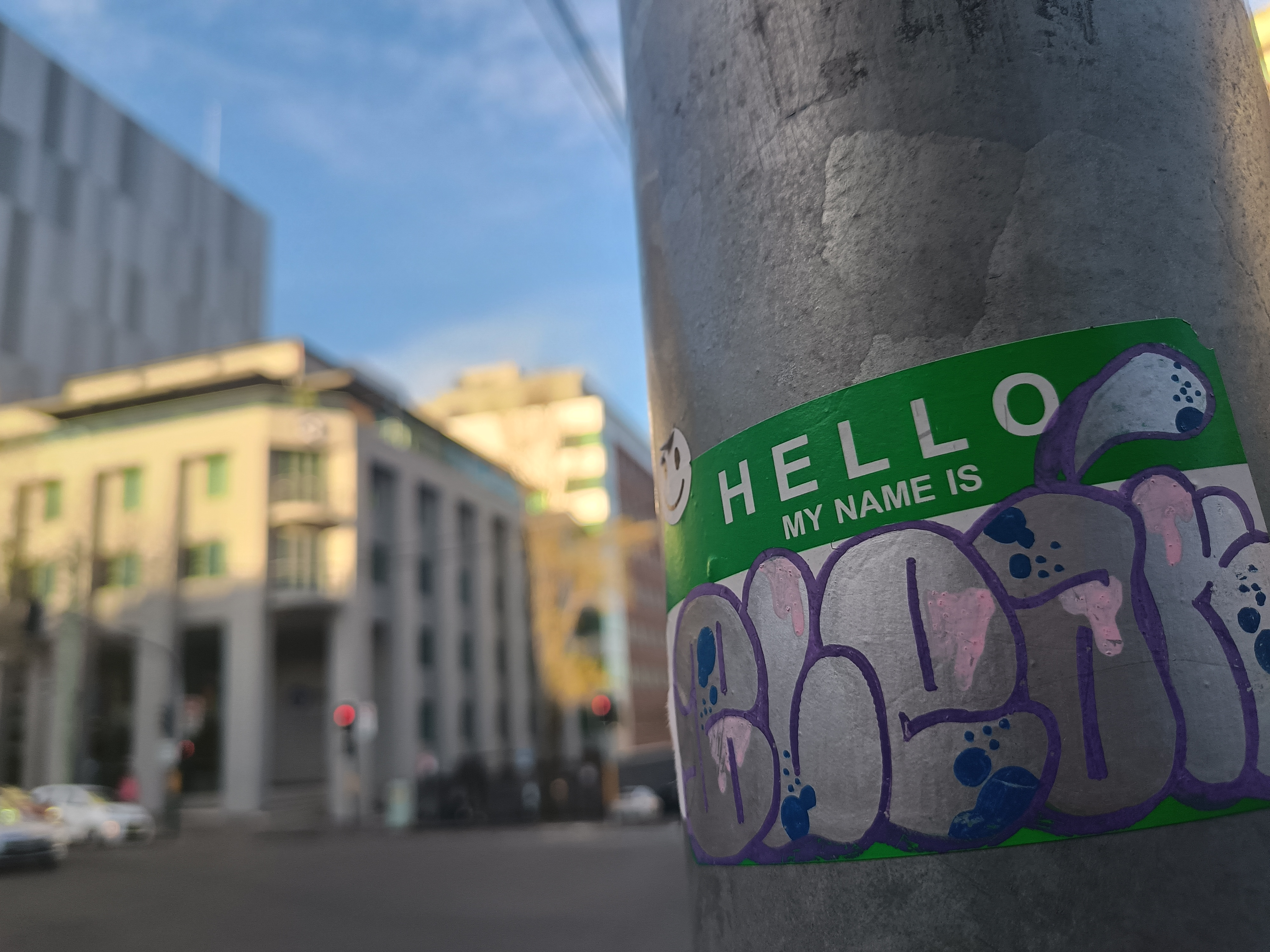

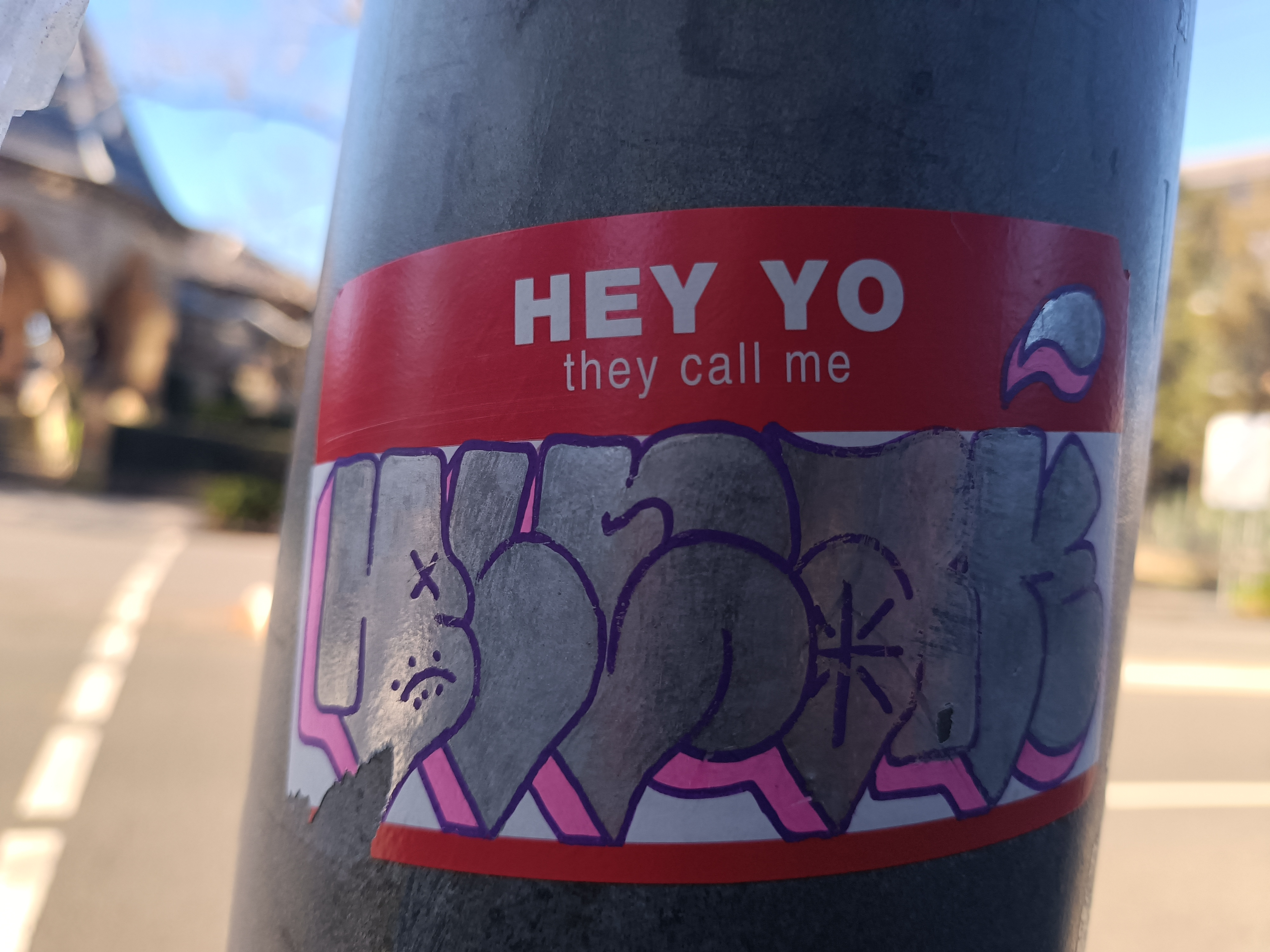
Two name tag stickers. The red "HEY YO" sticker is an eggshell sticker. Small pieces of it in the lower left hand corner have broken away when attempts have been made to remove it. Sydney, 2024

Stickers, also known as slaps, are drawn or written on before being put up in public. Stickers that became widely used include the United States Postal Service's Label 228 and name tags stickers. Name tag stickers that were printed with the text "Hello my name is", first introduced by C-Line Products in 1959, became widely used in both graffiti and sticker art. Eggshell stickers are also frequently used and they are named "Eggshell" as an attempt to remove them results in tiny pieces breaking off, like an eggshell. Stickers allow artists to put up their art quickly and discreetly, making them a relatively safer option for illegal graffiti.

Stickers

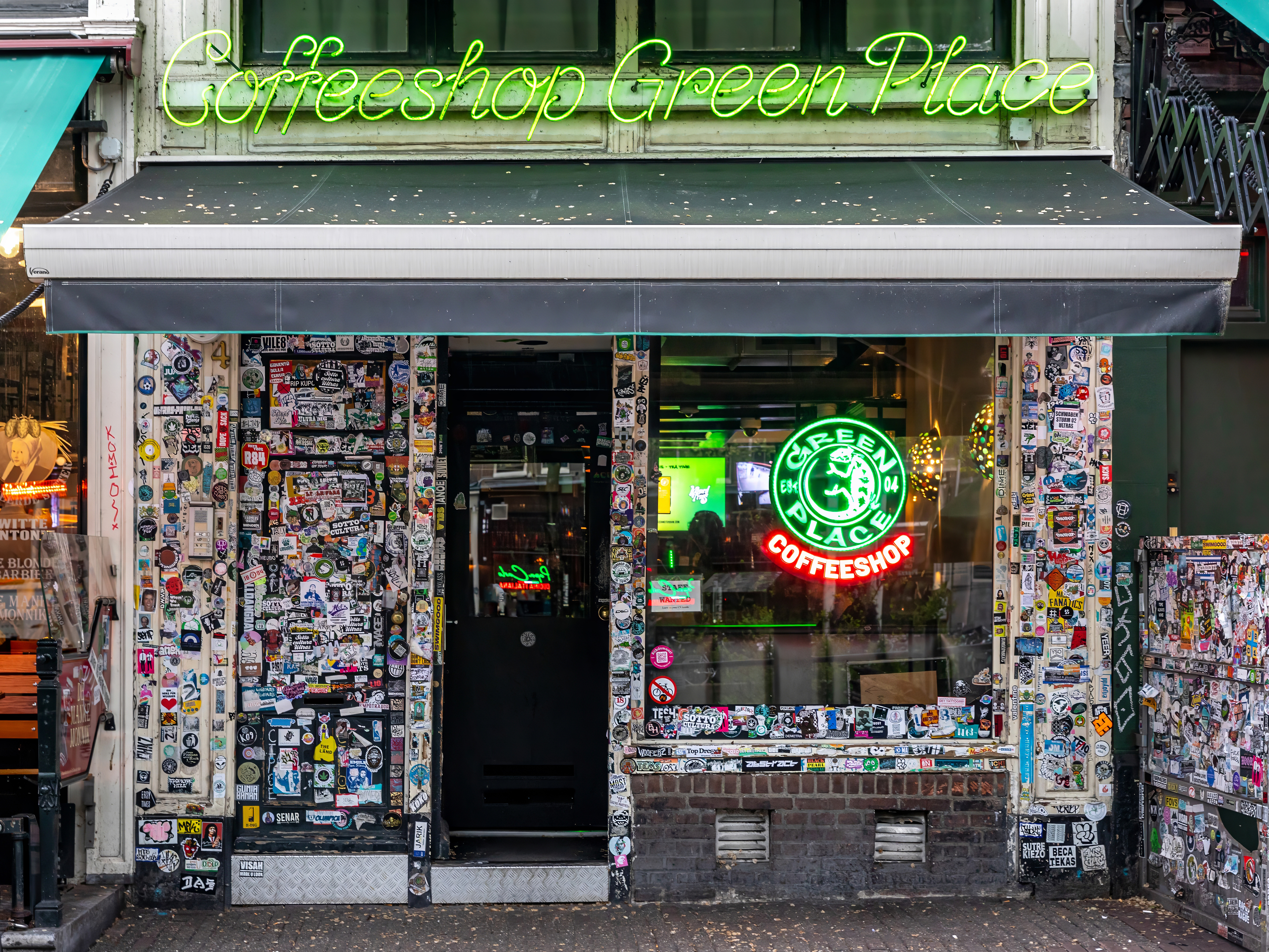
The exterior façade of the coffeeshop "Green Place" entirely covered with stickers in Amsterdam. 2024

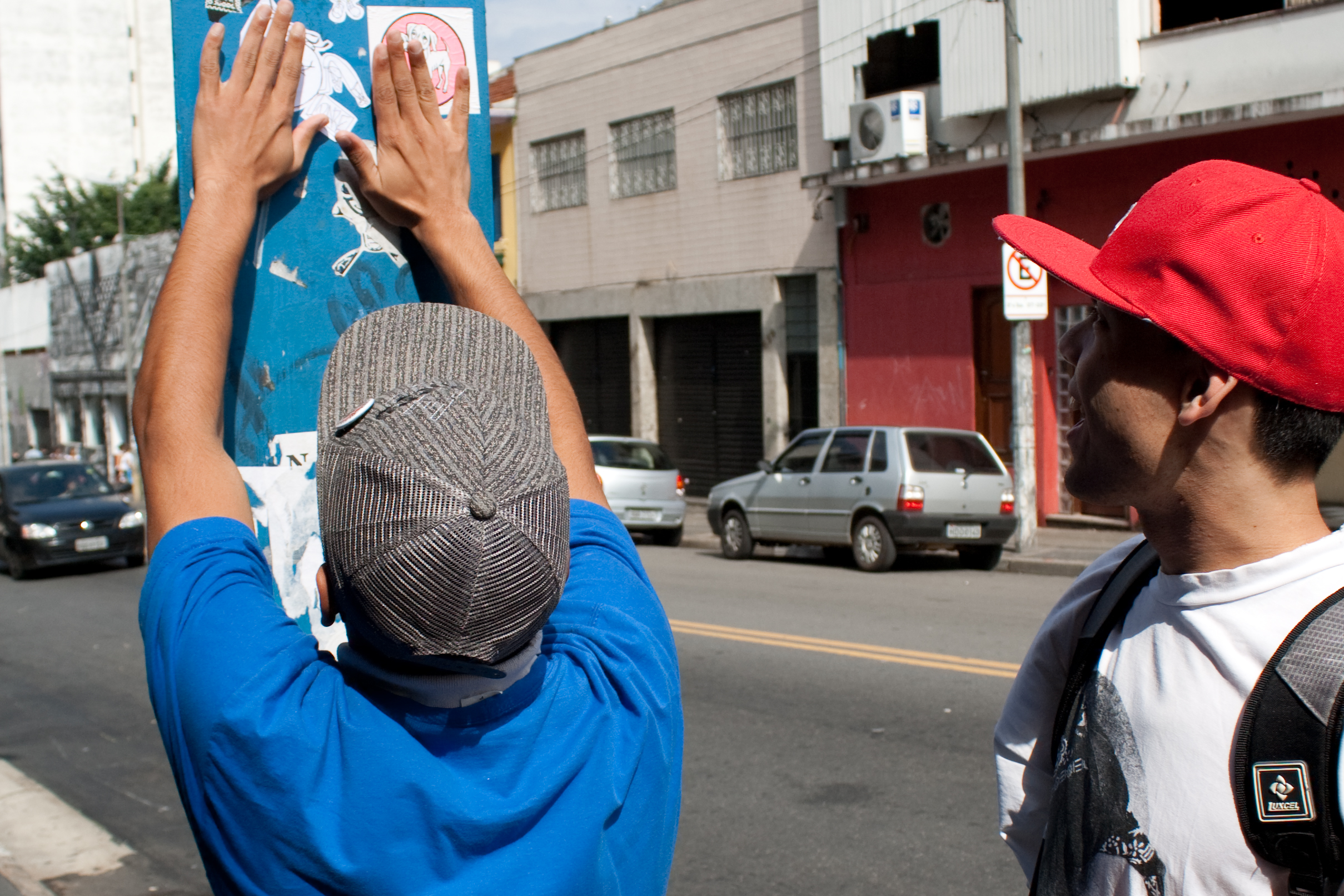
A person putting up a sticker in São Paulo. 2009

United States Postal service label 228's are often used in the creation of sticker art. Sydney 2026

=== Tags ===
Tagging is the practice of writing one's "name, initial or logo onto a public surface" in a handstyle unique to the writer. Tags were the first form of modern graffiti.

A number of recent examples of graffiti make use of hashtags.

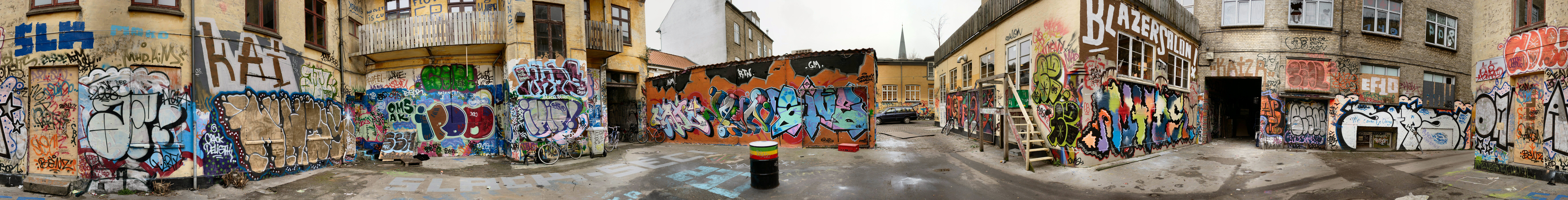
Densely-tagged parking area in Århus, Denmark. (2008)

=== Throw ups ===
Throw ups, or throwies are large, bubble-writing graffiti which aim to be "thrown onto" a surface as largely and quickly as possible. Throw ups can have fills or be "hollow". They prioritise minimal negative space and consistency or letter space and height.

=== Pieces ===
Pieces are large, elaborate, letter-based graffiti which usually use spray paint or rollers. Pieces often have multi-coloured fills and outlines, and may use highlights, shadows, backgrounds, extensions, 3D effects, and sometimes characters.

=== Wildstyle ===
Wildstyle is the most complex form of modern graffiti. It can be difficult for those unfamiliar with the art form to read. Wildstyle draws inspiration from calligraphy and has been described as partially abstract. The term "wildstyle" was popularized by the Wild Style graffiti crew formed by Tracy 168 of the Bronx, New York in 1974.

=== Modern experimentation ===
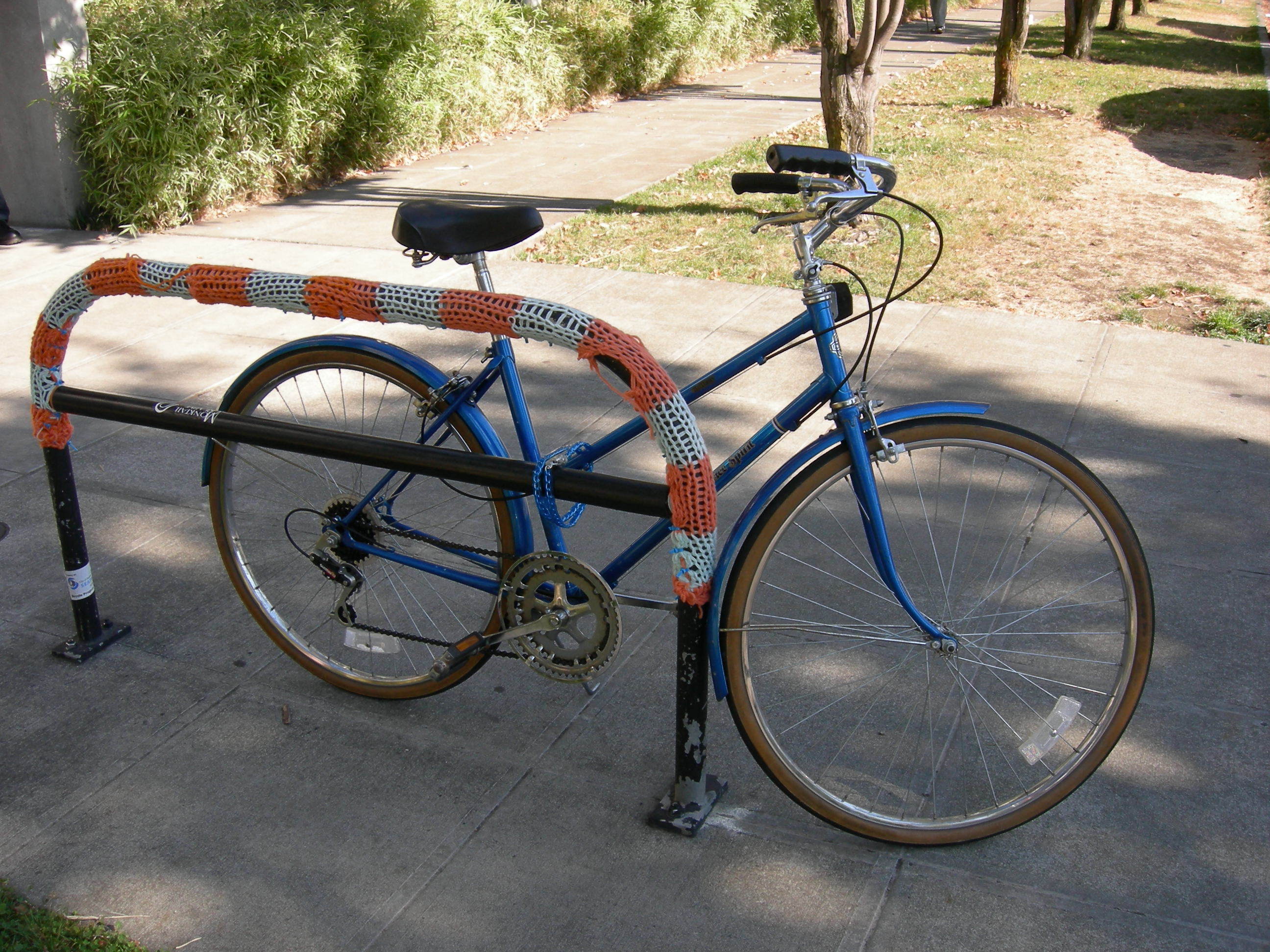
Knitted graffiti in Seattle, Washington

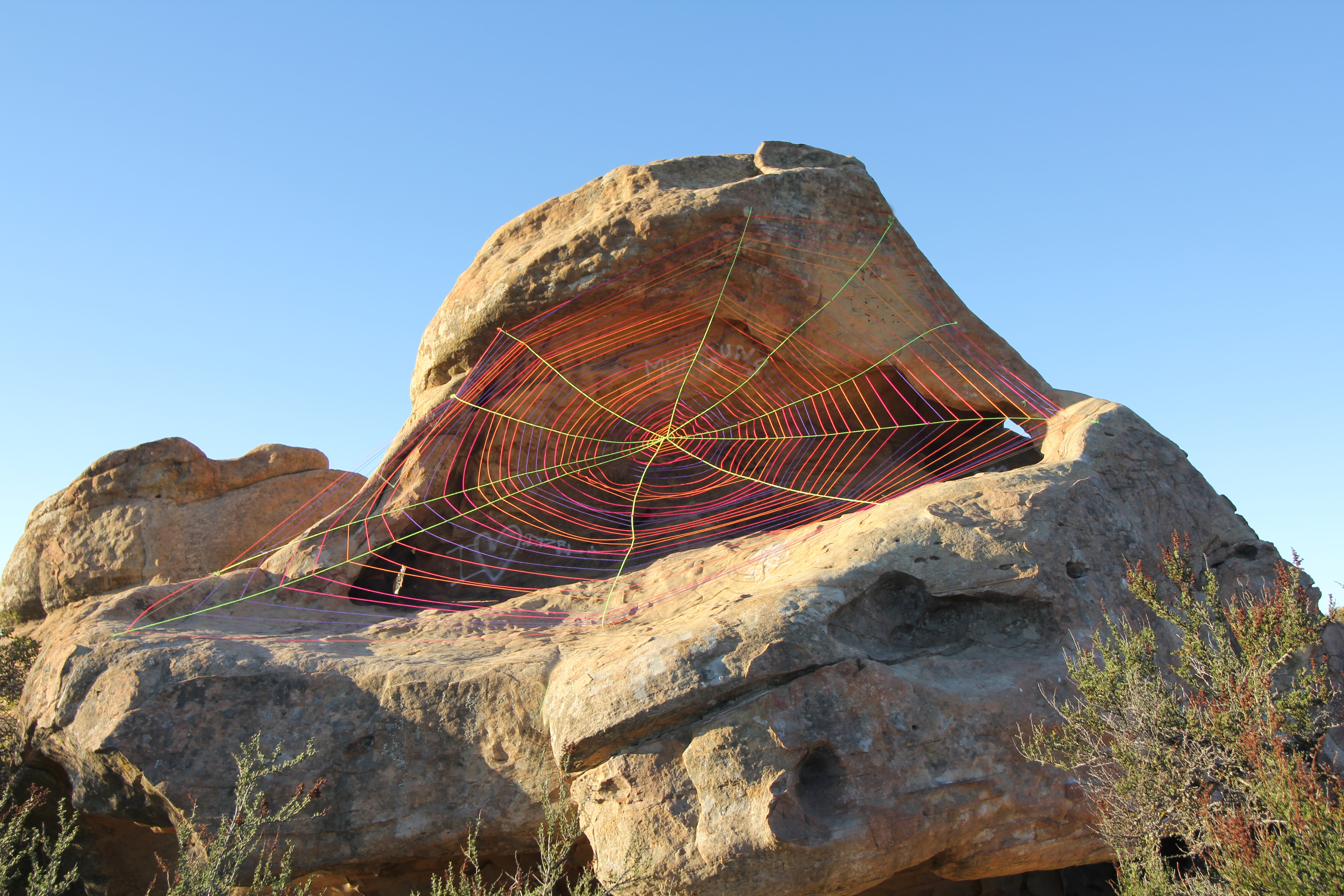
Stephen Duneier's Spiderweb Yarnbomb installation hides and highlights previous graffiti.

Modern graffiti art often incorporates additional arts and technologies. For example, Graffiti Research Lab has encouraged the use of projected images and magnetic light-emitting diodes (throwies) as new media for graffitists. Yarnbombing is another recent form of graffiti. Yarnbombers occasionally target previous graffiti for modification, which had been avoided among the majority of graffitists.

== Purpose ==
Theories on the use of graffiti by avant-garde artists have a history dating back at least to the Asger Jorn, who in 1962 painting declared in a graffiti-like gesture "the avant-garde won't give up".

=== Public art ===
People who appreciate graffiti often believe that it should be on display for everyone in public spaces, not hidden away in a museum or a gallery.

=== Personal expression ===
Graffiti can serve as a form of personal expression and communication. However, graffiti is to some people a form of art, but to some a form of vandalism. And many graffitists choose to protect their identities and remain anonymous to hinder prosecution.

With the commercialization of graffiti (and hip-hop in general), in most cases, even with legally painted "graffiti" art, graffitists tend to choose anonymity. This may be attributed to various reasons or a combination of reasons. Graffiti still remains the one of four hip-hop elements that is not considered "performance art" despite the image of the "singing and dancing star" that sells hip-hop culture to the mainstream. Being a graphic form of art, it might also be said that many graffitists still fall in the category of the introverted archetypal artist.

Banksy is one of the world's most notorious and popular street artists who continues to remain faceless in today's society. He is known for his political, anti-war stencil art mainly in Bristol, England, but his work may be seen anywhere from Los Angeles to Palestine. In the UK, Banksy is the most recognizable icon for this cultural artistic movement and keeps his identity a secret to avoid arrest. Much of Banksy's artwork may be seen around the streets of London and surrounding suburbs, although he has painted pictures throughout the world, including the Middle East, where he has painted on Israel's controversial West Bank barrier with satirical images of life on the other side. One depicted a hole in the wall with an idyllic beach, while another shows a mountain landscape on the other side. A number of exhibitions also have taken place since 2000, and recent works of art have fetched vast sums of money. Banksy's art is a prime example of the classic controversy: vandalism vs. art. Art supporters endorse his work distributed in urban areas as pieces of art and some councils, such as Bristol and Islington, have officially protected them, while officials of other areas have deemed his work to be vandalism and have removed it.

Graffiti artists may become offended if photographs of their art are published in a commercial context without their permission. In March 2020, the Finnish graffiti artist Psyke expressed his displeasure at the newspaper Ilta-Sanomat publishing a photograph of a Peugeot 208 in an article about new cars, with his graffiti prominently shown on the background. The artist claims he does not want his art being used in commercial context, not even if he were to receive compensation.

Personal graffiti

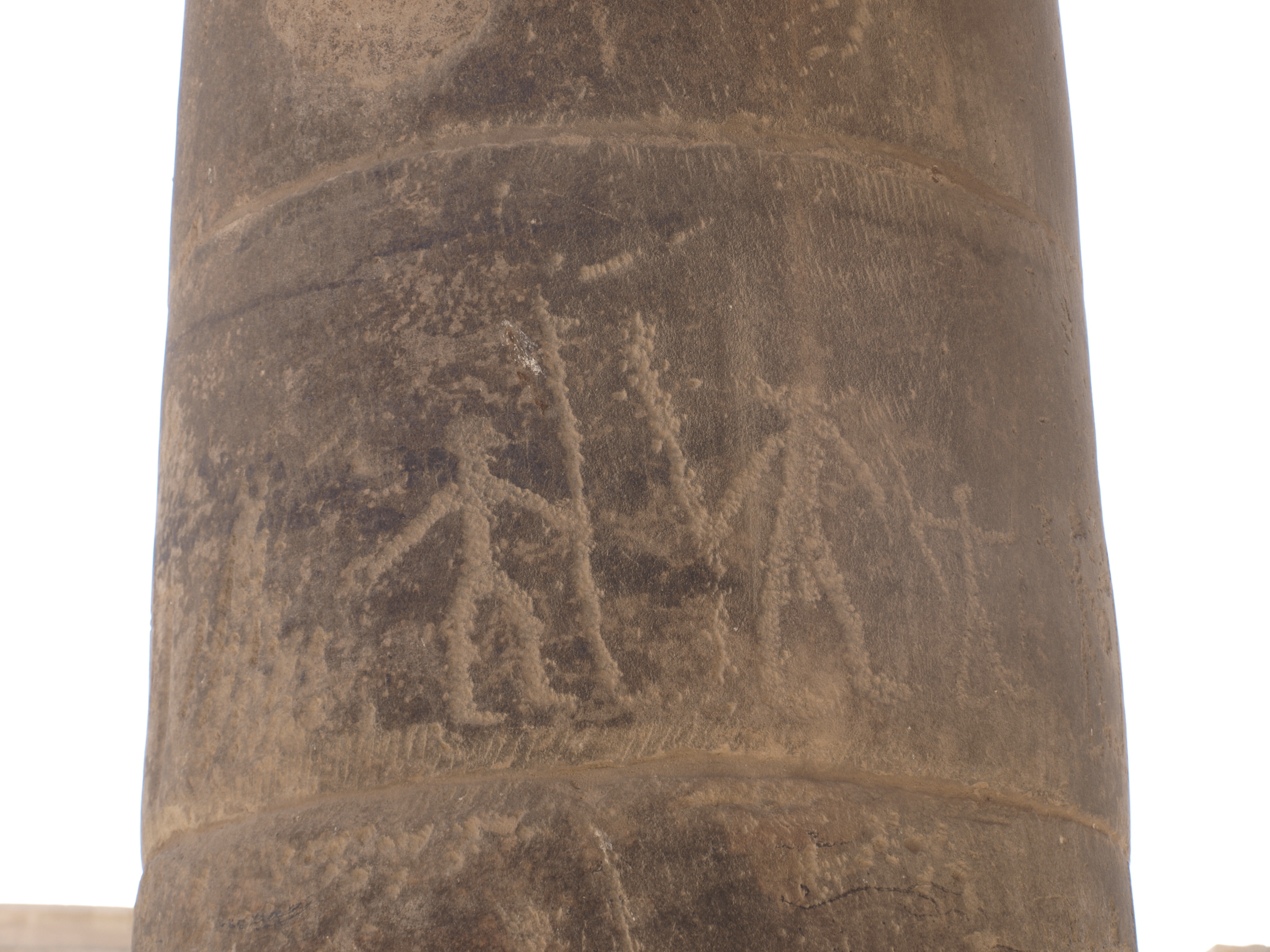
Drawing at Temple of Philae, Egypt, depicting three men with rods, or staves

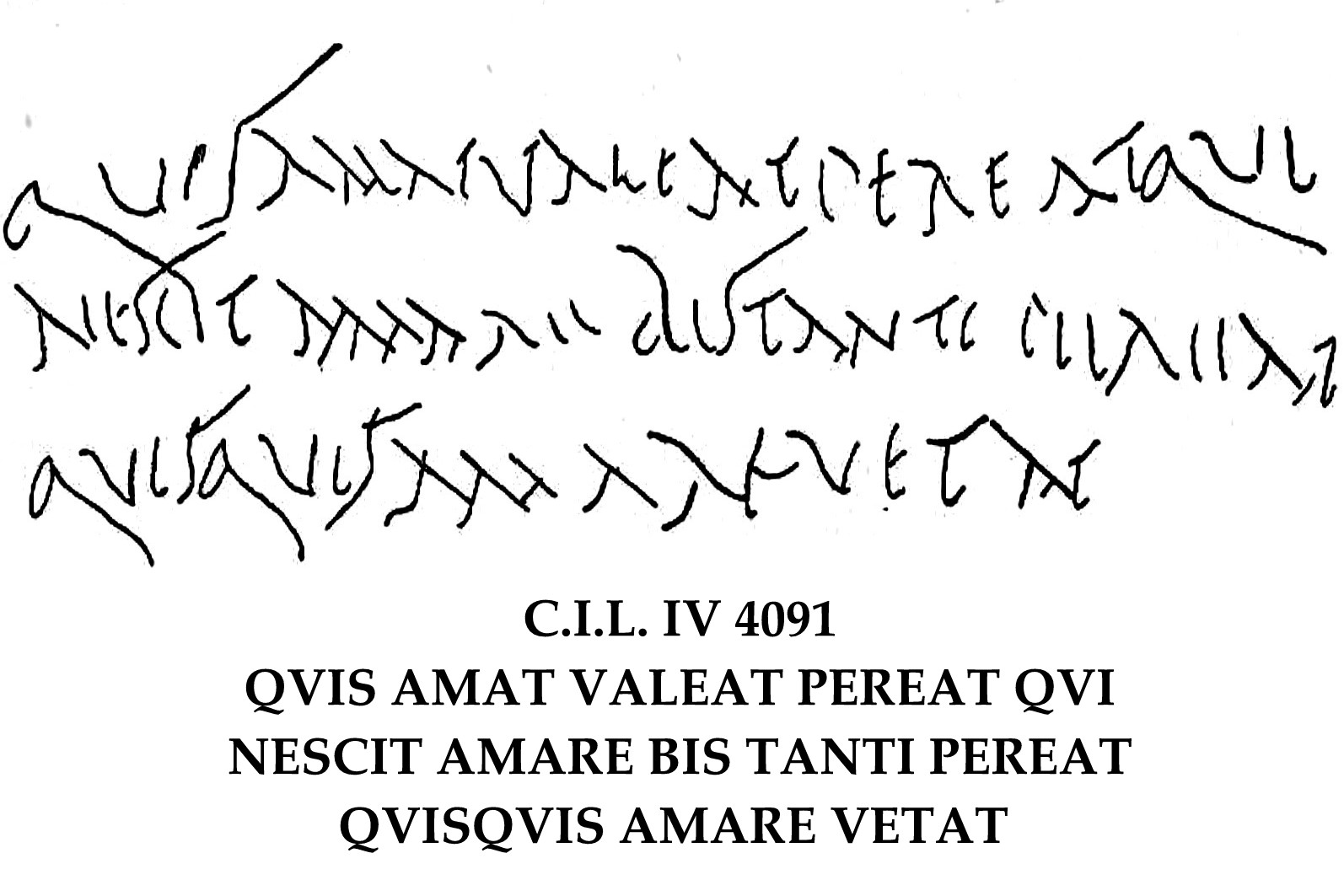
Inscription in Pompeii lamenting a frustrated love: "Whoever loves, let him flourish, let him perish who knows not love, let him perish twice over whoever forbids love"

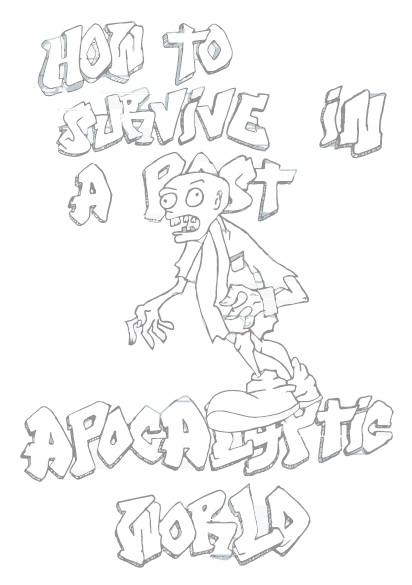
Post-apocalyptic despair

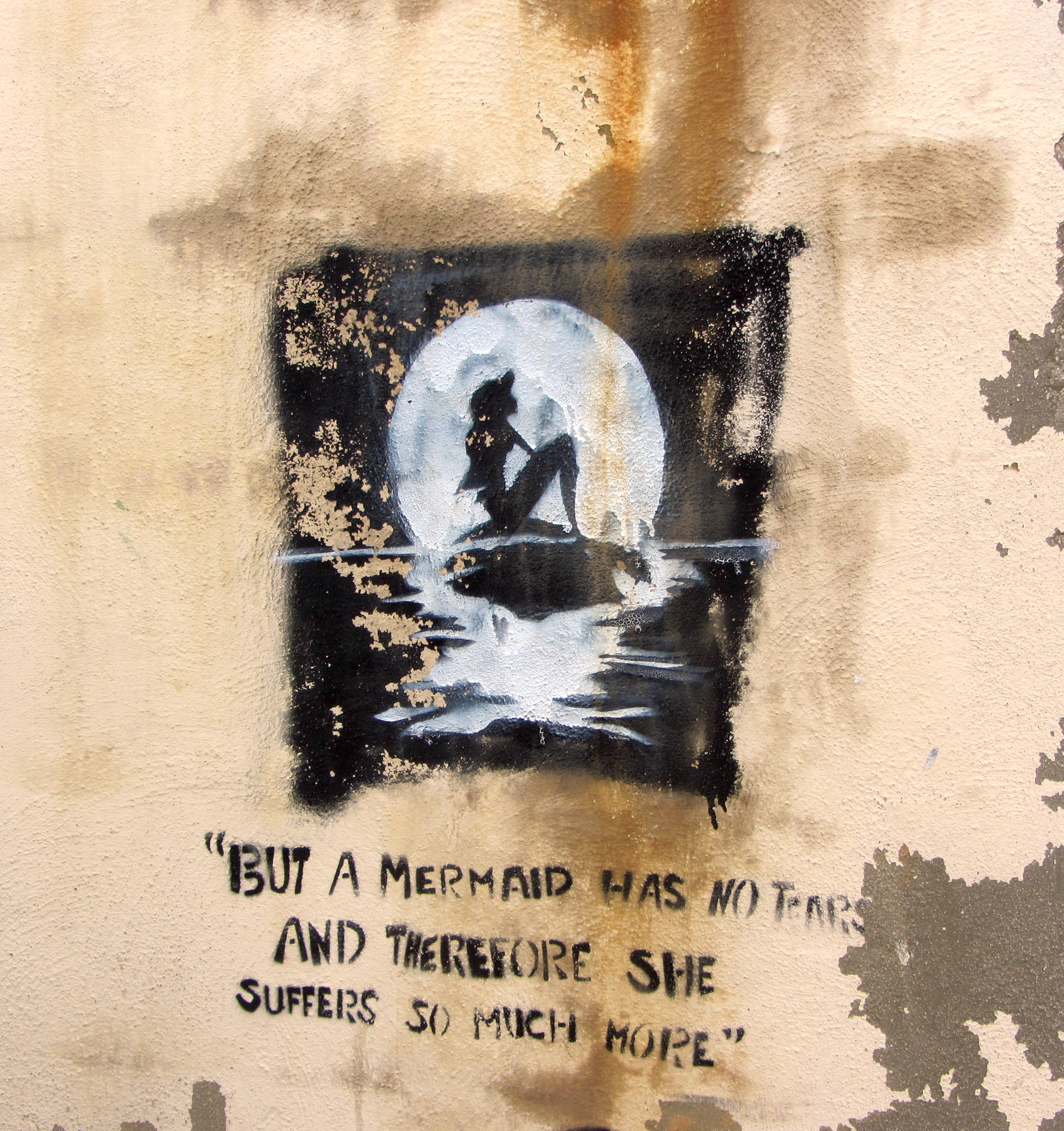
Mermaid in Sliema, Malta

=== Territorial ===
Territorial graffiti marks urban neighborhoods with tags and logos to differentiate certain groups from others. These images are meant to show outsiders a stern look at whose turf is whose. The subject matter of gang-related graffiti consists of cryptic symbols and initials strictly fashioned with unique calligraphies. Gang members use graffiti to designate membership throughout the gang, to differentiate rivals and associates and, most commonly, to mark borders which are both territorial and ideological.

=== Radical and political ===
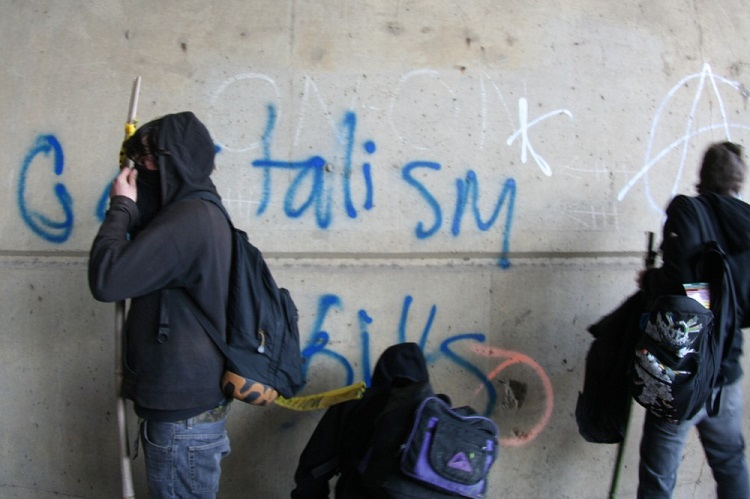
Black bloc members spray graffiti on a wall during an Iraq War Protest in Washington, D.C.

Many analysts and art critics see artistic value in some graffiti and recognize it as a form of public art. According to many art researchers, particularly in the Netherlands and in Los Angeles graffiti is an effective tool of social emancipation, or for the achievement of a political goal.

In times of conflict graffiti has offered a means of communication and self-expression for members of these socially, ethnically, or racially divided communities, and has been an effective tool for establishing dialog. The Berlin Wall was extensively covered by graffiti reflecting social pressures related to the oppressive Soviet rule over the GDR.

Graffiti often has a reputation as part of a subculture that rebels against authority, although the considerations of the practitioners often diverge and can relate to a wide range of attitudes. It can express a political practice and can form just one tool in an array of resistance techniques. One early example includes the anarcho-punk band Crass, who conducted a campaign of stenciling anti-war, anarchist, feminist, and anti-consumerist messages throughout the London Underground system during the late 1970s and early 1980s. In Amsterdam, graffiti was a major part of the punk scene. The city was covered in names such as "De Zoot", "Vendex", and "Dr Rat". To document the graffiti, a punk magazine was started that was called Gallery Anus. So when hip-hop came to Europe in the early 1980s, there was already a vibrant graffiti culture.

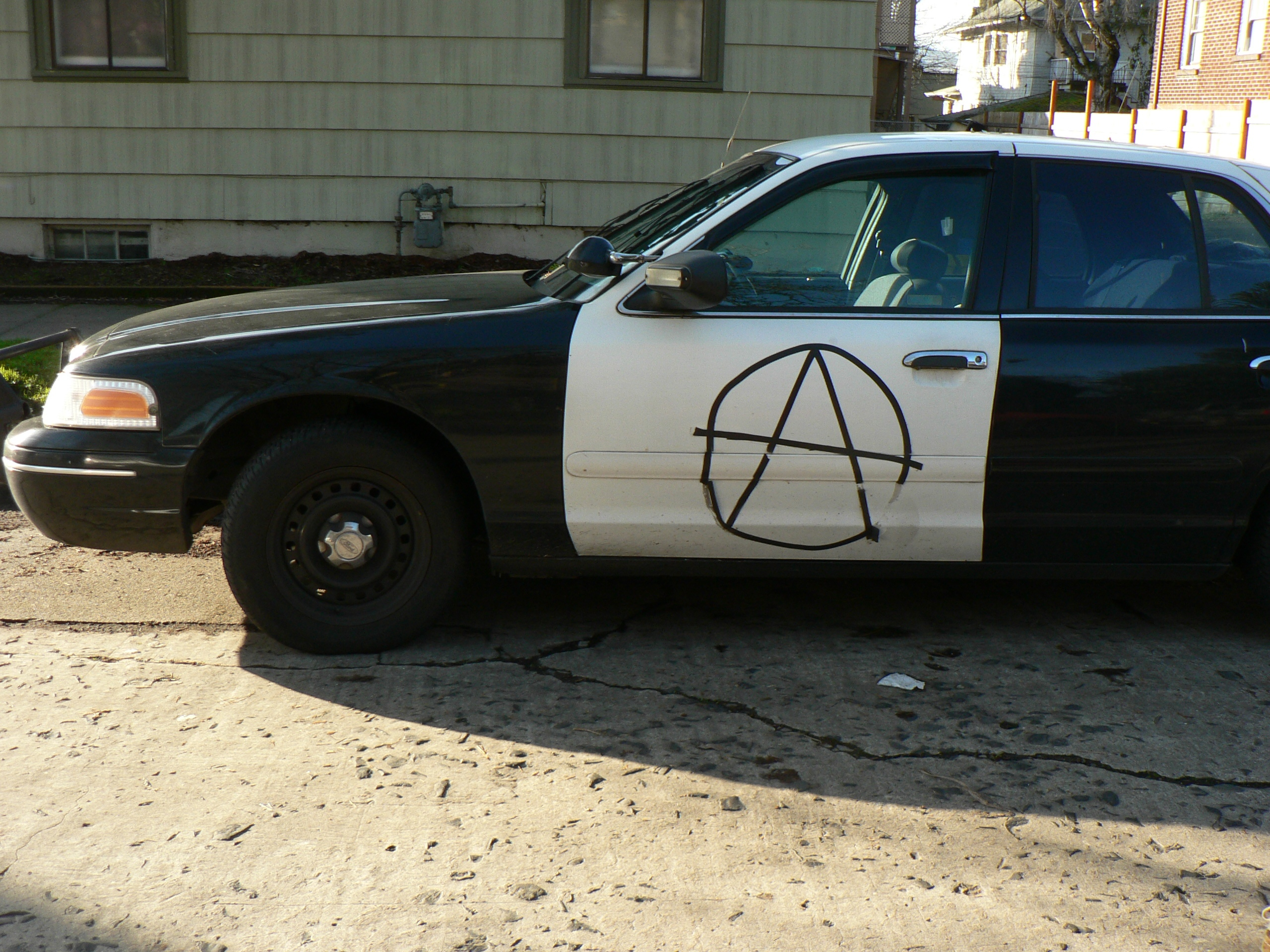
Police car graffitied with the anarchist circle-A symbol in Portland, Oregon in January 2008

The student protests and general strike of May 1968 saw Paris bedecked in revolutionary, anarchistic, and situationist slogans such as L'ennui est contre-révolutionnaire ("Boredom is counterrevolutionary") and Lisez moins, vivez plus ("Read less, live more"). While not exhaustive, the graffiti gave a sense of the 'millenarian' and rebellious spirit, tempered with a good deal of verbal wit, of the strikers.

Billboards and other consumer advertising have been the target of graffiti. From 1978 to 1994 tobacco, alcohol and other advertising was regularly painted over in Australia by the group Billboard Utilising Graffitists Against Unhealthy Promotions (BUGA UP). At one point, up to fifty billboards were altered a week, with the group specialising in altering advertising slogans and images to change their meaning.

I think graffiti writing is a way of defining what our generation is like. Excuse the French, we're not a bunch of p---- artists. Traditionally artists have been considered soft and mellow people, a little bit kooky. Maybe we're a little bit more like pirates that way. We defend our territory, whatever space we steal to paint on, we defend it fiercely.

— Sandra "Lady Pink" Fabara

The developments of graffiti art which took place in art galleries and colleges as well as "on the street" or "underground", contributed to the resurfacing in the 1990s of a far more overtly politicized art form in the subvertising, culture jamming, or tactical media movements. These movements or styles tend to classify the artists by their relationship to their social and economic contexts, since, in most countries, graffiti art remains illegal in many forms except when using non-permanent paint. Since the 1990s with the rise of Street Art, a growing number of artists are switching to non-permanent paints and non-traditional forms of painting.

Contemporary practitioners, accordingly, have varied and often conflicting practices. Some individuals, such as Alexander Brener, have used the medium to politicize other art forms, and have used the prison sentences enforced on them as a means of further protest. The practices of anonymous groups and individuals also vary widely, and practitioners by no means always agree with each other's practices. For example, the anti-capitalist art group the Space Hijackers did a piece in 2004 about the contradiction between the capitalistic elements of Banksy and his use of political imagery.

Berlin human rights activist Irmela Mensah-Schramm has received global media attention and numerous awards for her 35-year campaign of effacing neo-Nazi and other right-wing extremist graffiti throughout Germany, often by altering hate speech in humorous ways.

Political graffiti around the world

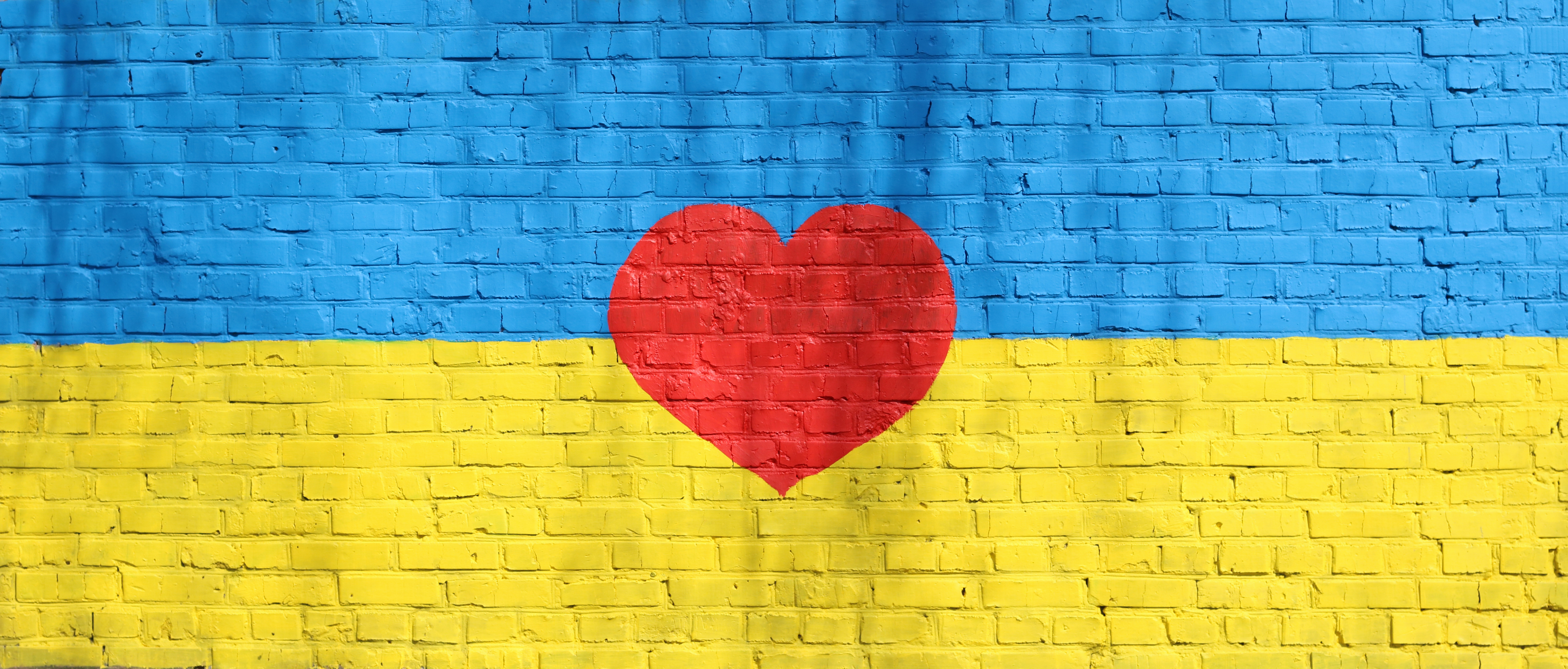
Patriotic graffiti in Vinnytsia, Ukraine during the war (2022)

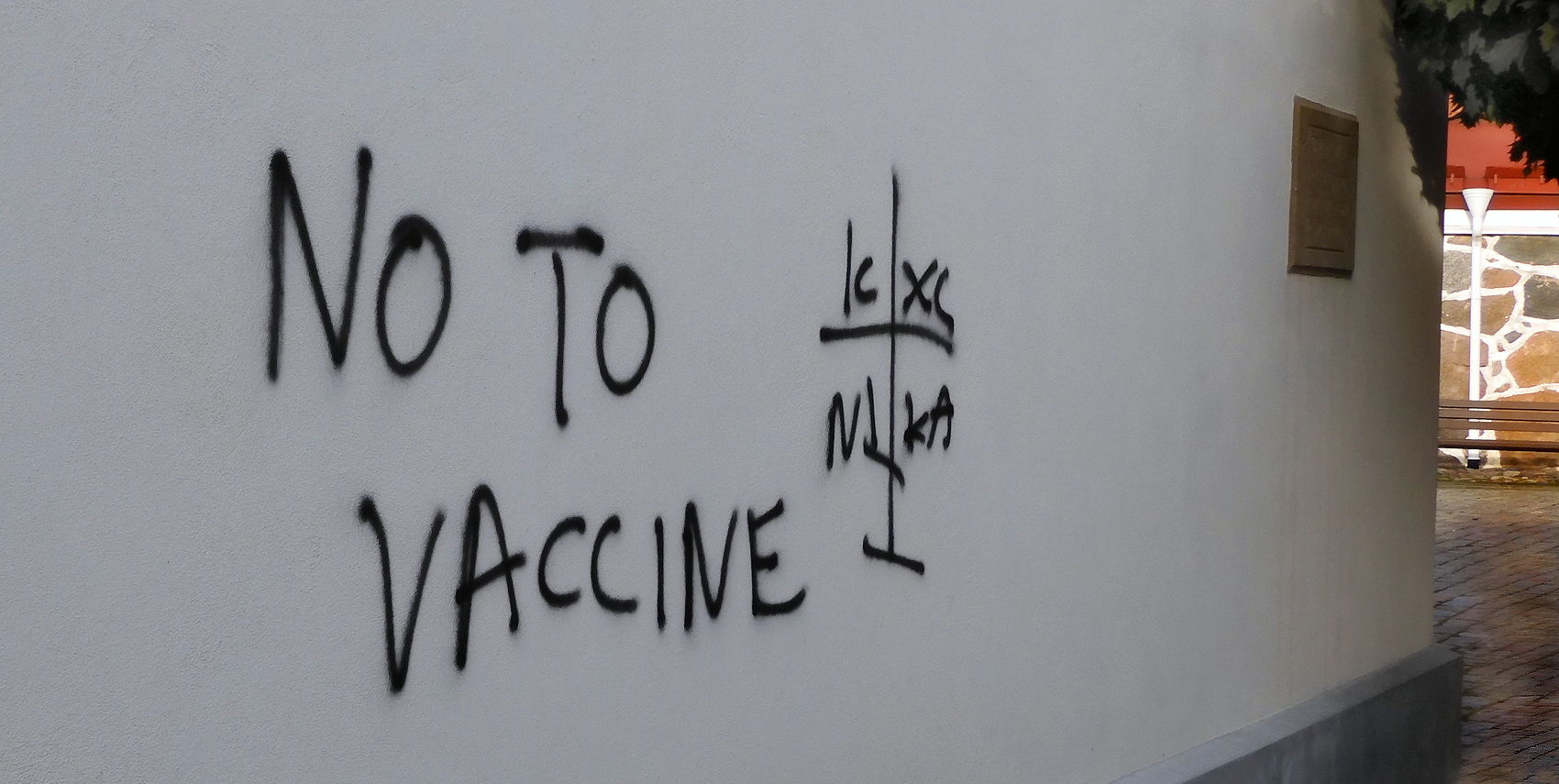
Anti-vaccine graffiti with orthodox cross at the Catholic Church in Ystad, 2021

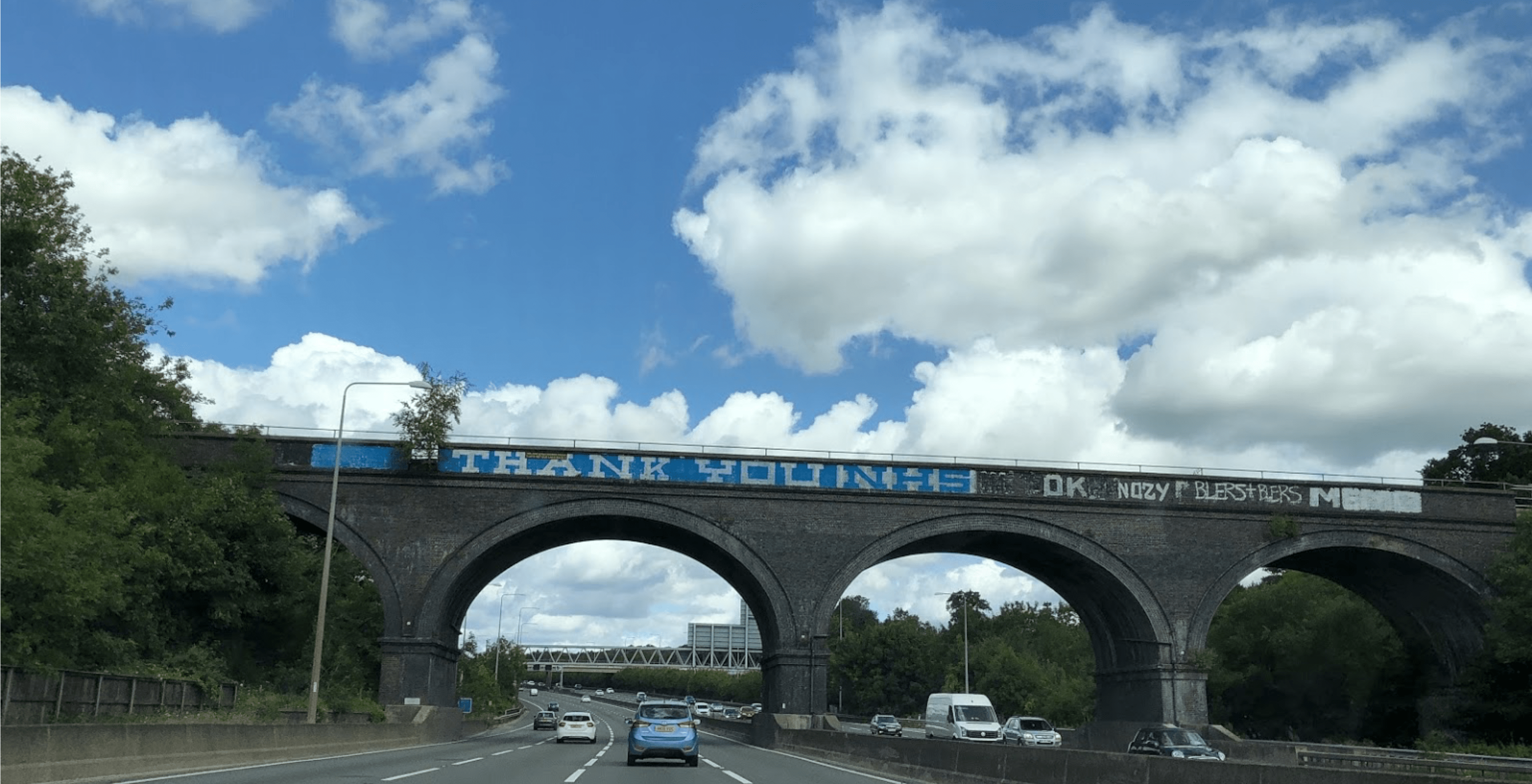
"Thank You NHS" painted on the Chalfont Viaduct, Buckinghamshire in March 2020 during the COVID-19 pandemic

Anti-Iraq war graffiti by street artist Sony Montana in Cancún, Mexico (2007)

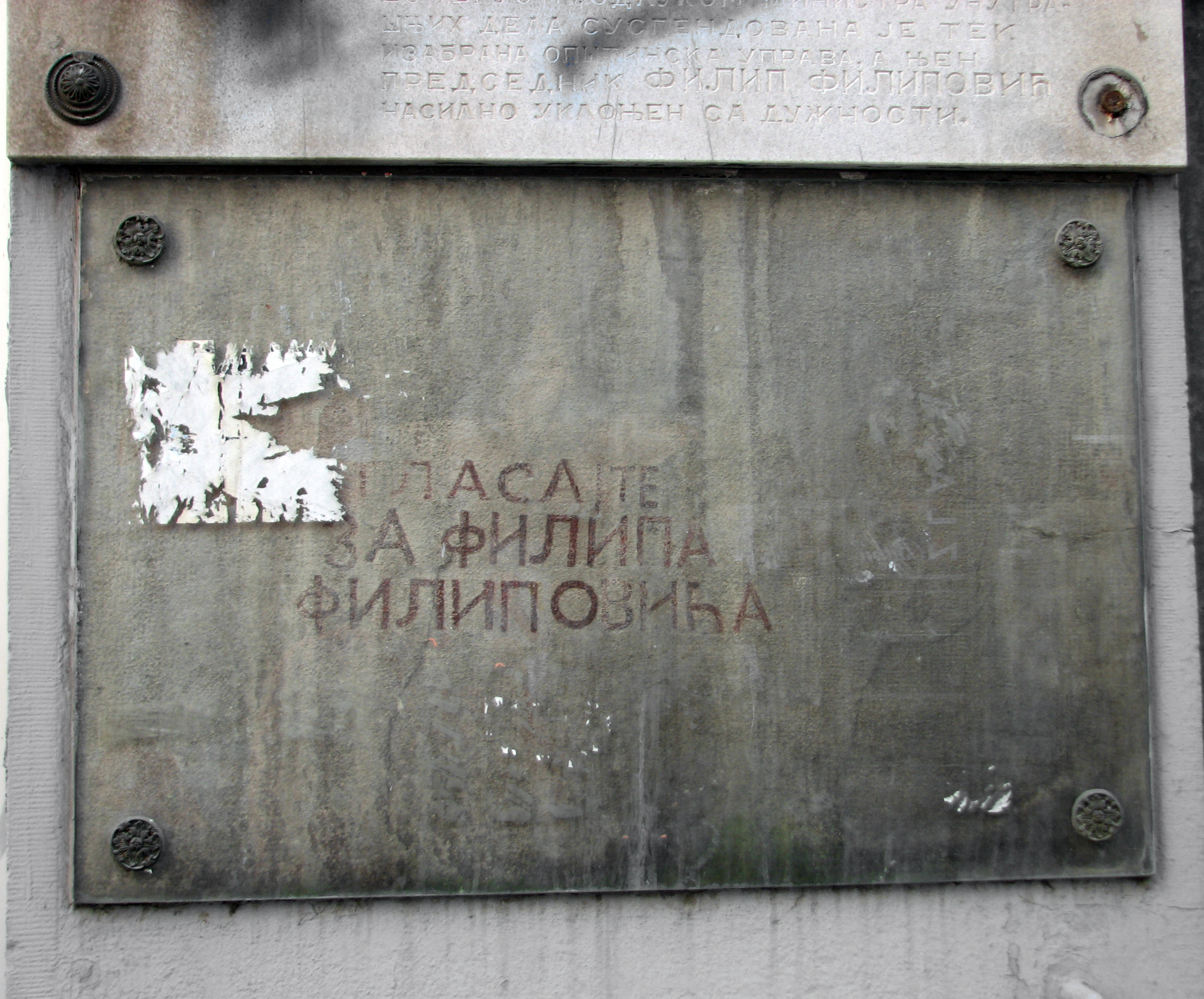
Wall in Belgrade, Serbia, with the slogan "Vote for Filip Filipović", who was the communist candidate for the mayor of Belgrade (1920)

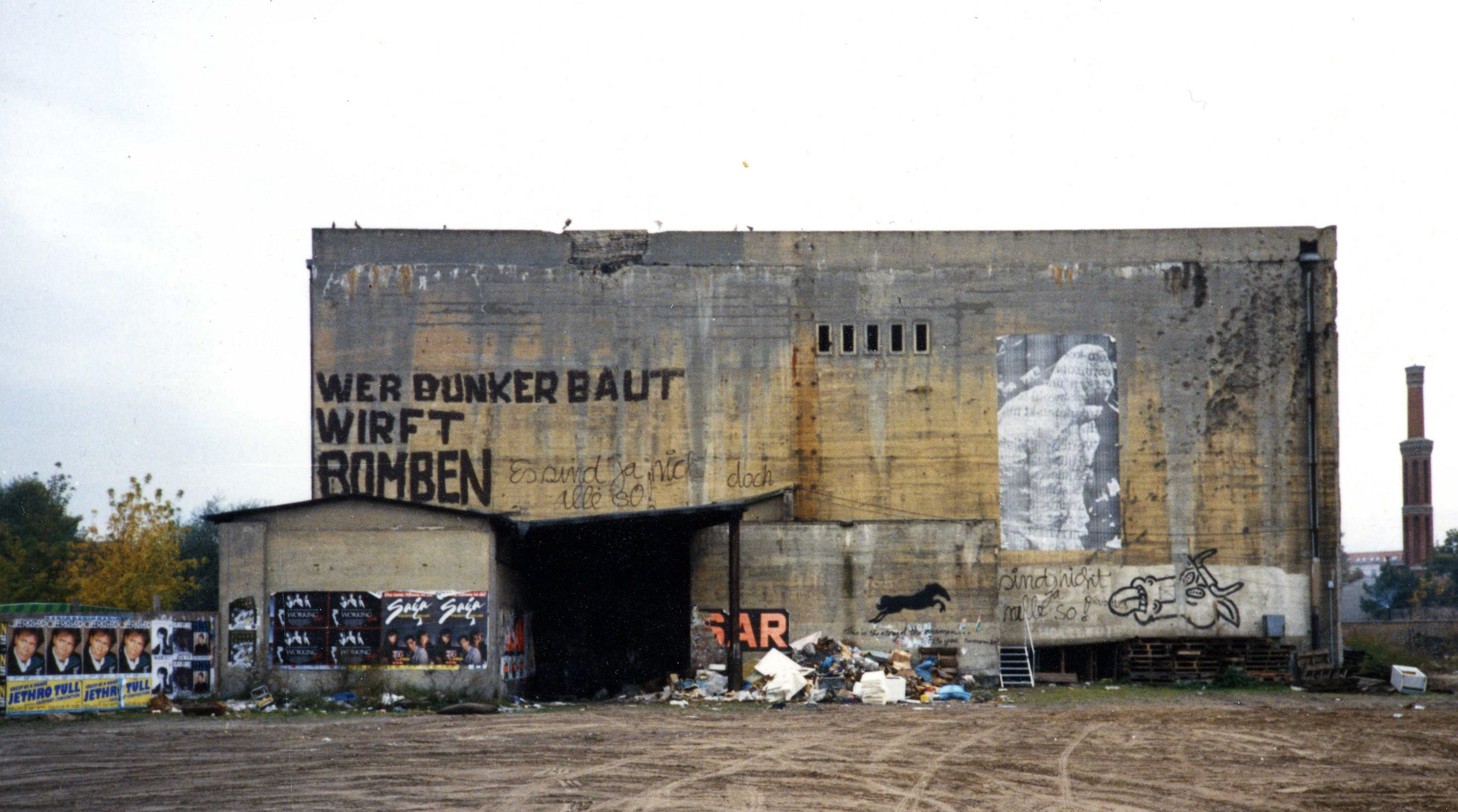
WWII bunker near Anhalter Bahnhof (Berlin) with a graffiti inscription Wer Bunker baut, wirft Bomben (those who build bunkers, throw bombs)

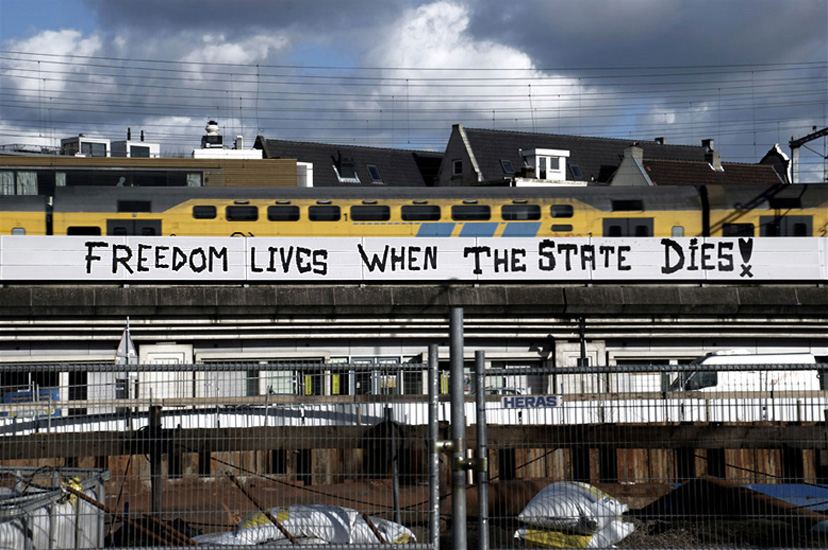
Anarchist graffiti on the train line leading to Central Station in Amsterdam

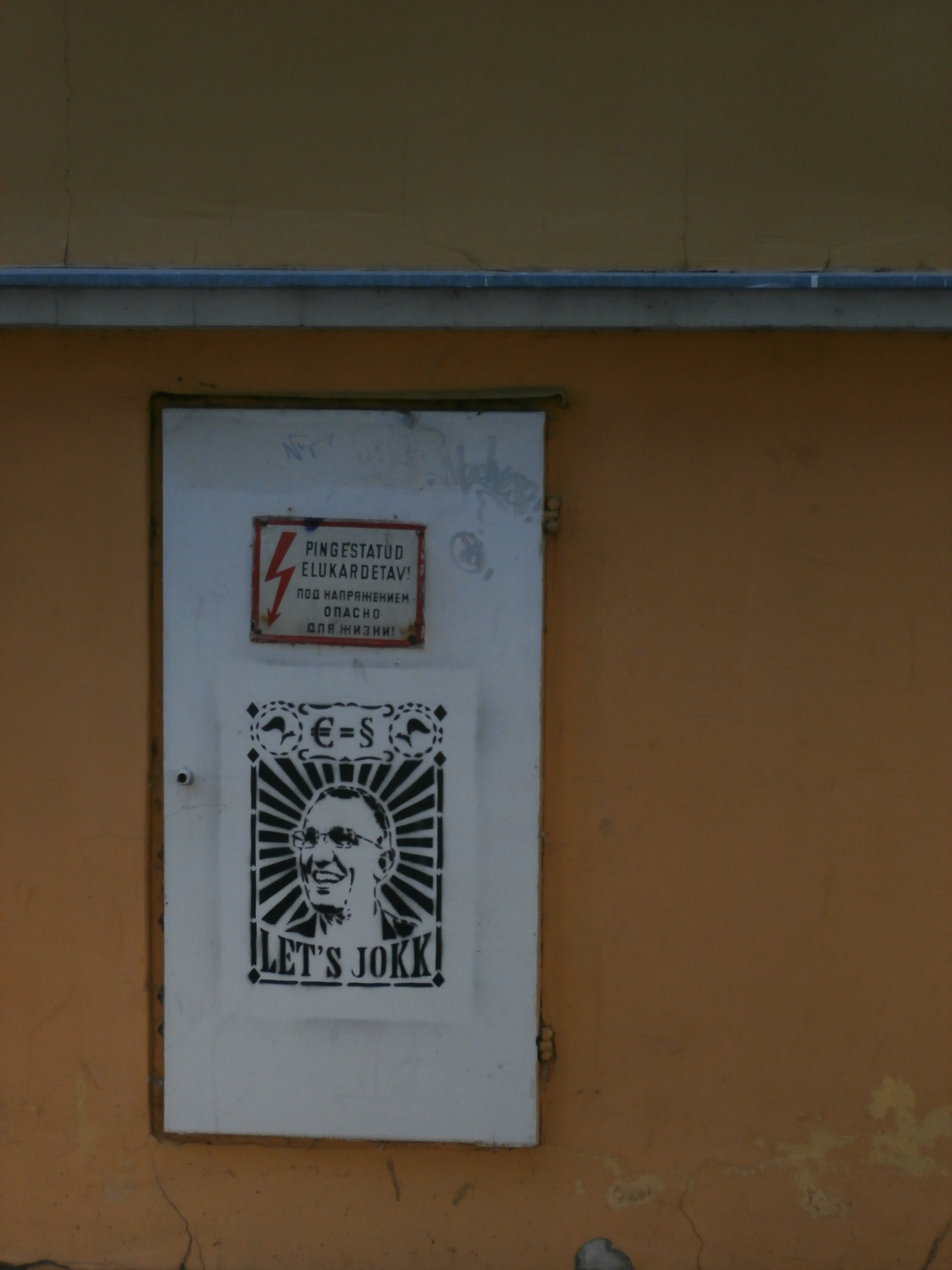
"Let's JOKK" in Tartu refers to political scandal with the Estonian Reform Party (2012).

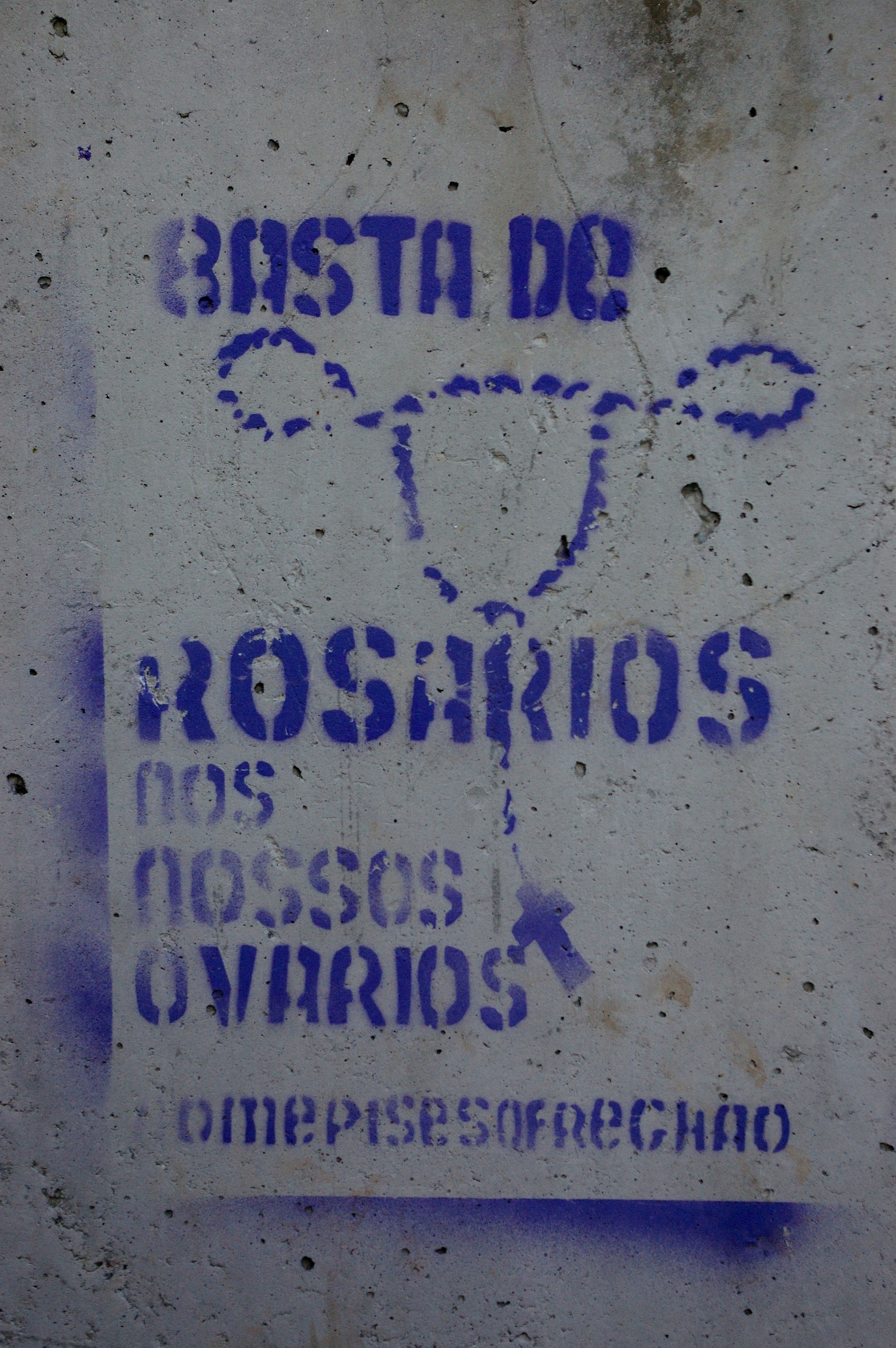
Feminist graffiti in A Coruña, Spain, that reads Enough with rosaries in our ovaries

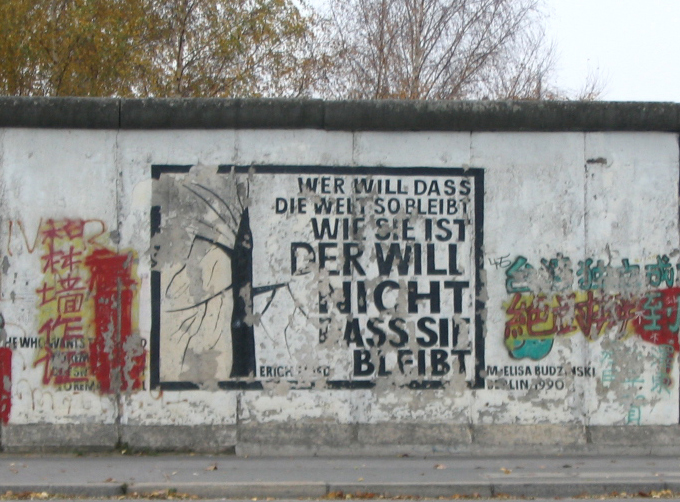
Berlin Wall: "Anyone who wants to keep the world as it is, does not want it to remain"

=== Genocide denial ===
In the Serbian capital, Belgrade, the graffiti depicting a uniformed former general of Serb army and War Criminal, convicted at ICTY for war crimes and crimes against humanity, including genocide and ethnic cleansing in Bosnian War, Ratko Mladić, appeared in a military salute alongside the words "General, thanks to your mother". Aleks Eror, Berlin-based journalist, explains how "veneration of historical and wartime figures" through street art is not a new phenomenon in the region of former Yugoslavia, and that "in most cases is firmly focused on the future, rather than retelling the past". In a long expose on the subject of Bosnian genocide denial, at Balkan Diskurs magazine and multimedia platform website, Kristina Gadže and Taylor Whitsell referred to these experiences as a young generations' "cultural heritage", in which youths are being exposed to the celebration and affirmation of war-criminals as part of their "formal education" and "inheritance".

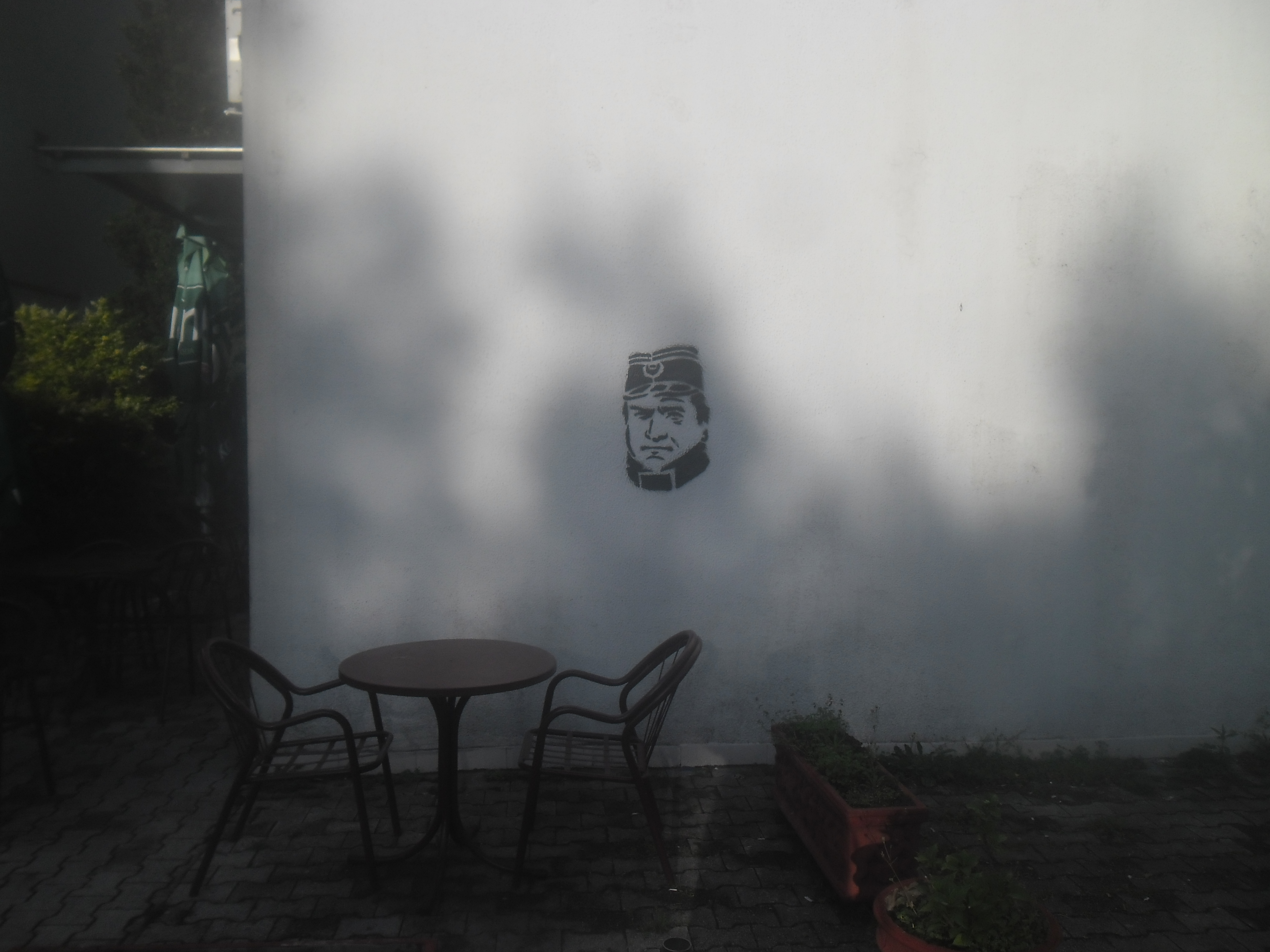
Mural in Bar, Montenegro, depicting the war criminal Ratko Mladić

There are examples of genocide denial through the celebration and affirmation of war criminals throughout the region of Western Balkans, inhabited by Serbs, using graffiti. Several of these are found in the Serbian capital, and many more across Serbia and the Bosnian and Herzegovinian administrative entity, Republika Srpska, which is the ethnic Serbian majority enclave. Critics point that Serbia as a state, is willing to defend the mural of convicted war criminal, and have no intention to react on cases of genocide denial, noting that Interior Minister of Serbia, Aleksandar Vulin decision to ban any gathering with an intent to remove the mural, with the deployment of riot police, sends the message of "tacit endorsement". Consequently, on 9 November 2021, Serbian heavy police in riot gear, with the graffiti creators and their supporters, blocked the access to the mural to prevent human rights groups and other activists to paint over it and mark the International Day Against Fascism and Antisemitism in that way, and even arrested two civic activist for throwing eggs at the graffiti.

=== Offensive graffiti ===
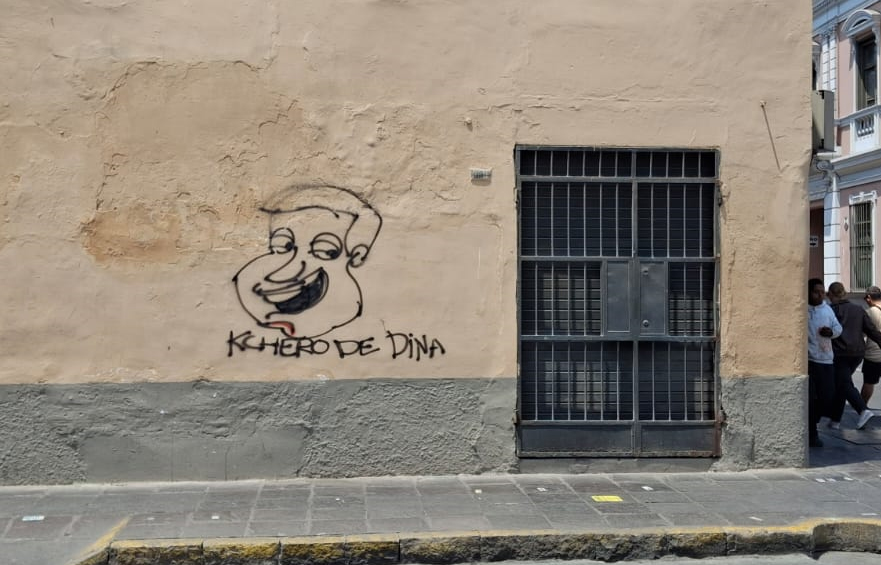
Caricature based on Glenn Quagmire of American animated series Family Guy in Historic Centre of Lima, Peru

Graffiti may also be used as offensive expression. Because this form of graffiti is often quickly removed by local authorities, surviving racist graffiti is often more subtle and not easily recognized at first sight. It can be understood only if one knows the relevant "local code" (social, historical, political, temporal, and spatial), which is seen as heteroglossia and thus a "unique set of conditions" in a cultural context.

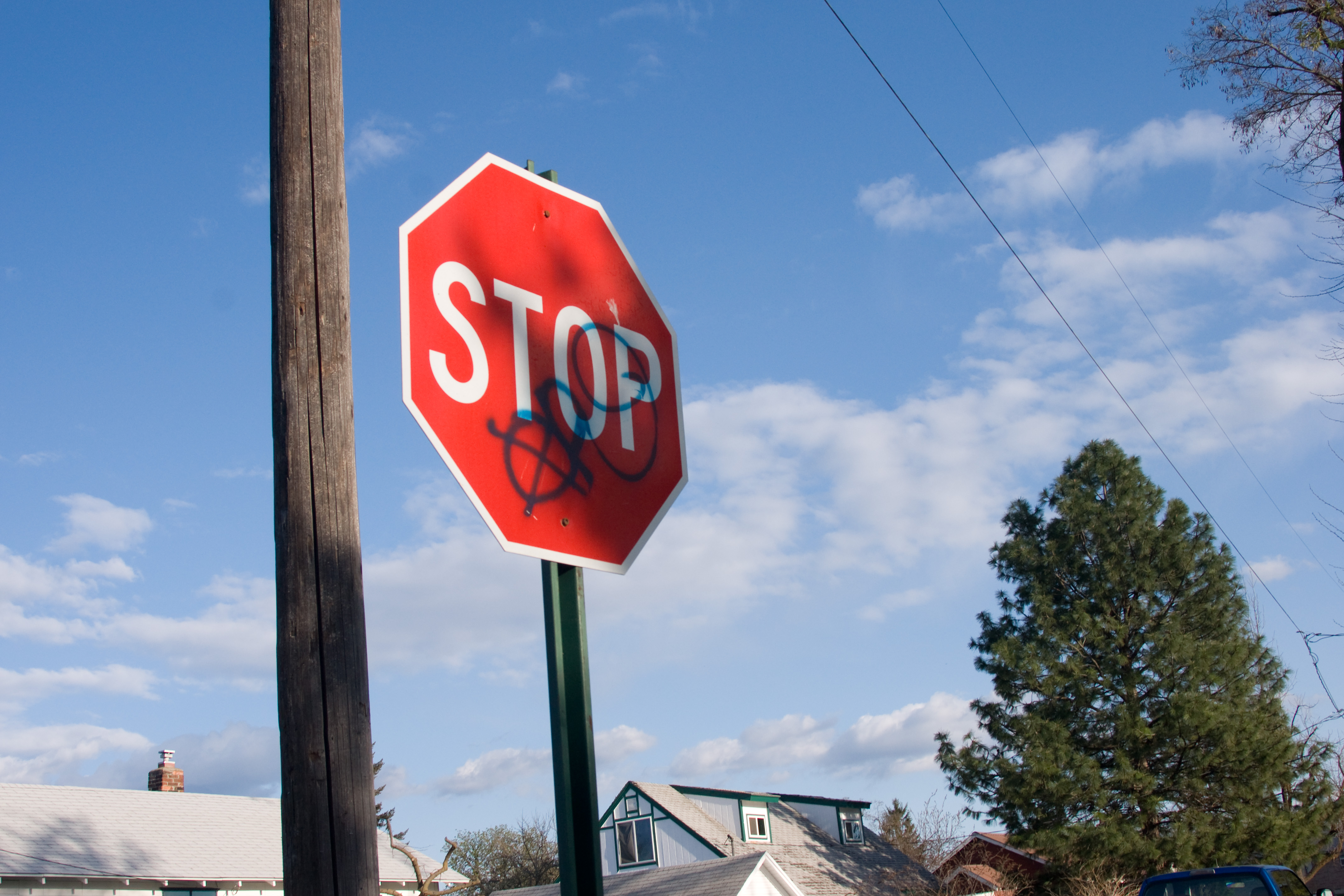
Gang symbol markings on public property, Millwood, Washington

For example, a racist youth group could graffiti their name or abbreviation, and only residents who already know of the graffiti's context would know that it is racist. In most cases, graffiti is the herald of more serious criminal activity to come.

By making the graffiti less explicit (as adapted to social and legal constraints), these drawings are less likely to be removed, but do not lose their threatening and offensive character.

Activists in Russia have used painted caricatures of local officials with their mouths as potholes, to show their anger about the poor state of the roads. In Manchester, England, a graffitist painted obscene images around potholes, which often resulted in them being repaired within 48 hours.

== Decorative and high art ==
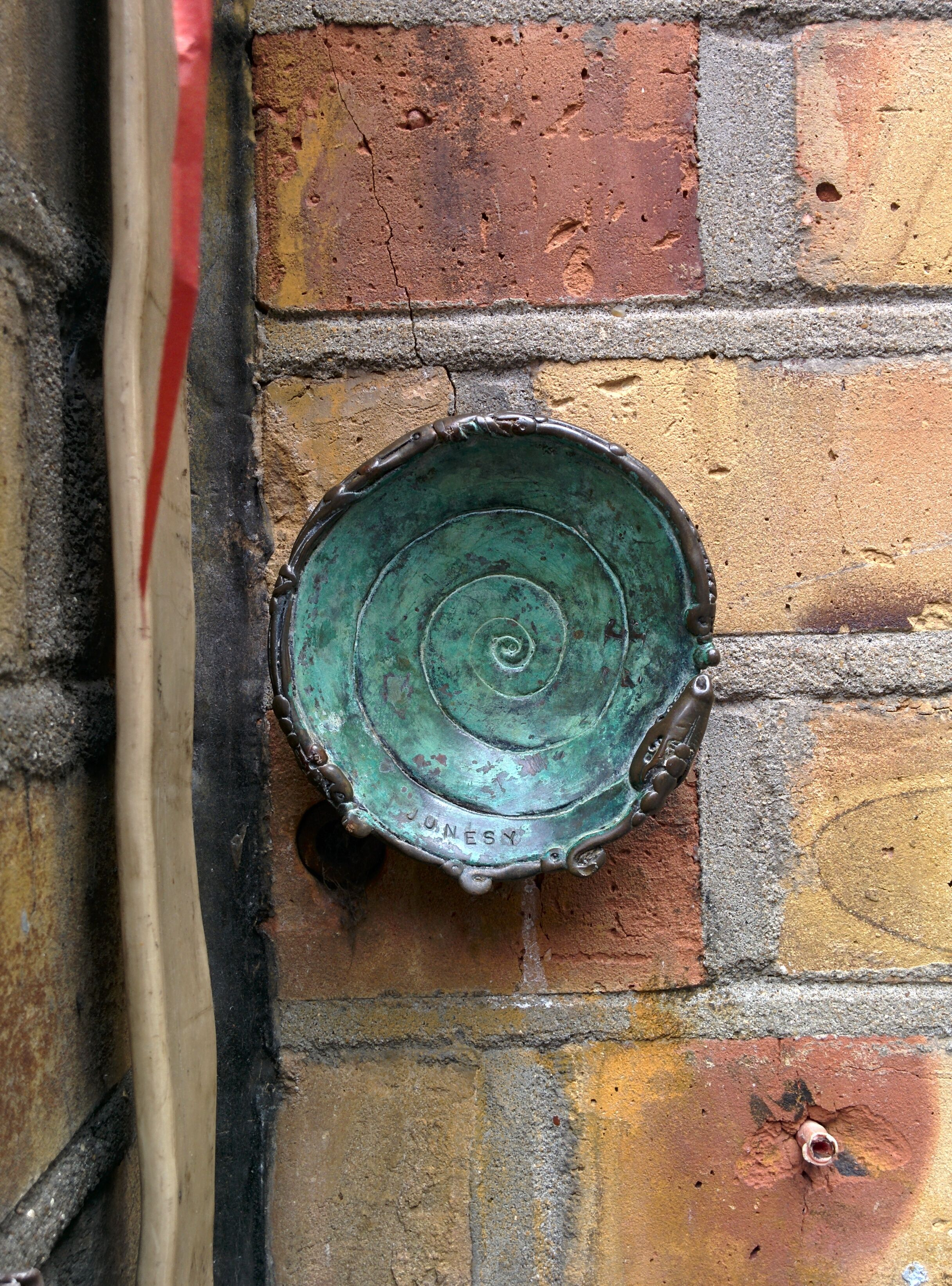
A bronze work by Jonesy on a wall in Brick Lane (London). Diameter about 8 cm.

In the early 1980s, the first art galleries to show graffitists to the public were Fashion Moda in the Bronx, Now Gallery and Fun Gallery, both in the East Village, Manhattan.

A 2006 exhibition at the Brooklyn Museum displayed graffiti as an art form that began in New York's outer boroughs and reached great heights in the early 1980s with the work of Crash, Lee, Daze, Keith Haring, and Jean-Michel Basquiat. It displayed 22 works by New York graffitists, including Crash, Daze, and Lady Pink. In an article about the exhibition in the magazine Time Out, curator Charlotta Kotik said that she hoped the exhibition would cause viewers to rethink their assumptions about graffiti.

From the 1970s onwards, Burhan Doğançay photographed urban walls all over the world; these he then archived for use as sources of inspiration for his painterly works. The project today known as "Walls of the World" grew beyond even his own expectations and comprises about 30,000 individual images. It spans a period of 40 years across five continents and 114 countries. In 1982, photographs from this project comprised a one-man exhibition titled "Les murs murmurent, ils crient, ils chantent ..." (The walls whisper, shout and sing ...) at the Centre Georges Pompidou in Paris.

In Australia, art historians have judged some local graffiti of sufficient creative merit to rank them firmly within the arts. Oxford University Press's art history text Australian Painting 1788–2000 concludes with a long discussion of graffiti's key place within contemporary visual culture, including the work of several Australian practitioners.

Between March and April 2009, 150 artists exhibited 300 pieces of graffiti at the Grand Palais in Paris.

Street art graffiti

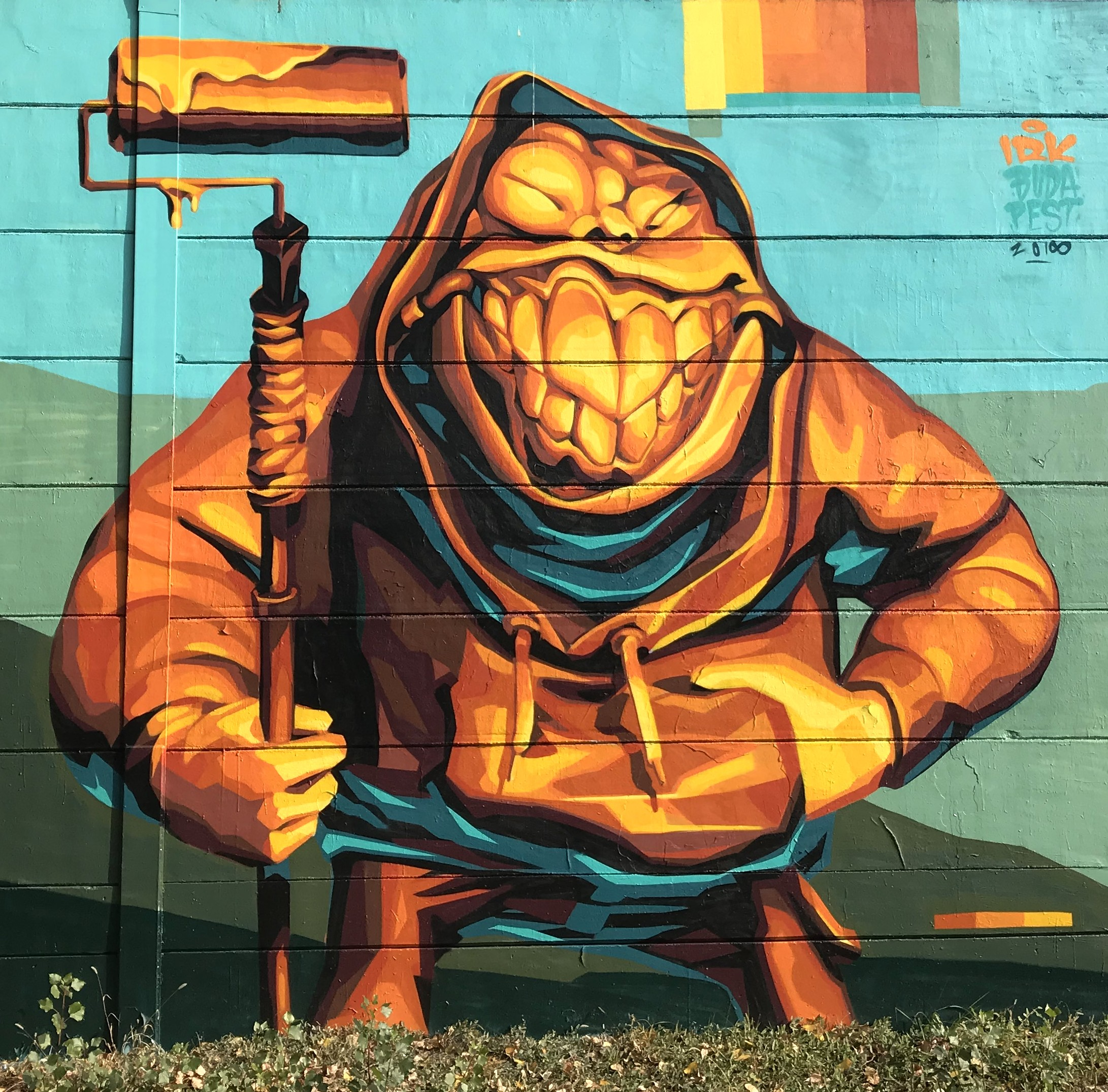
Graffiti on a wall in Budapest, Hungary

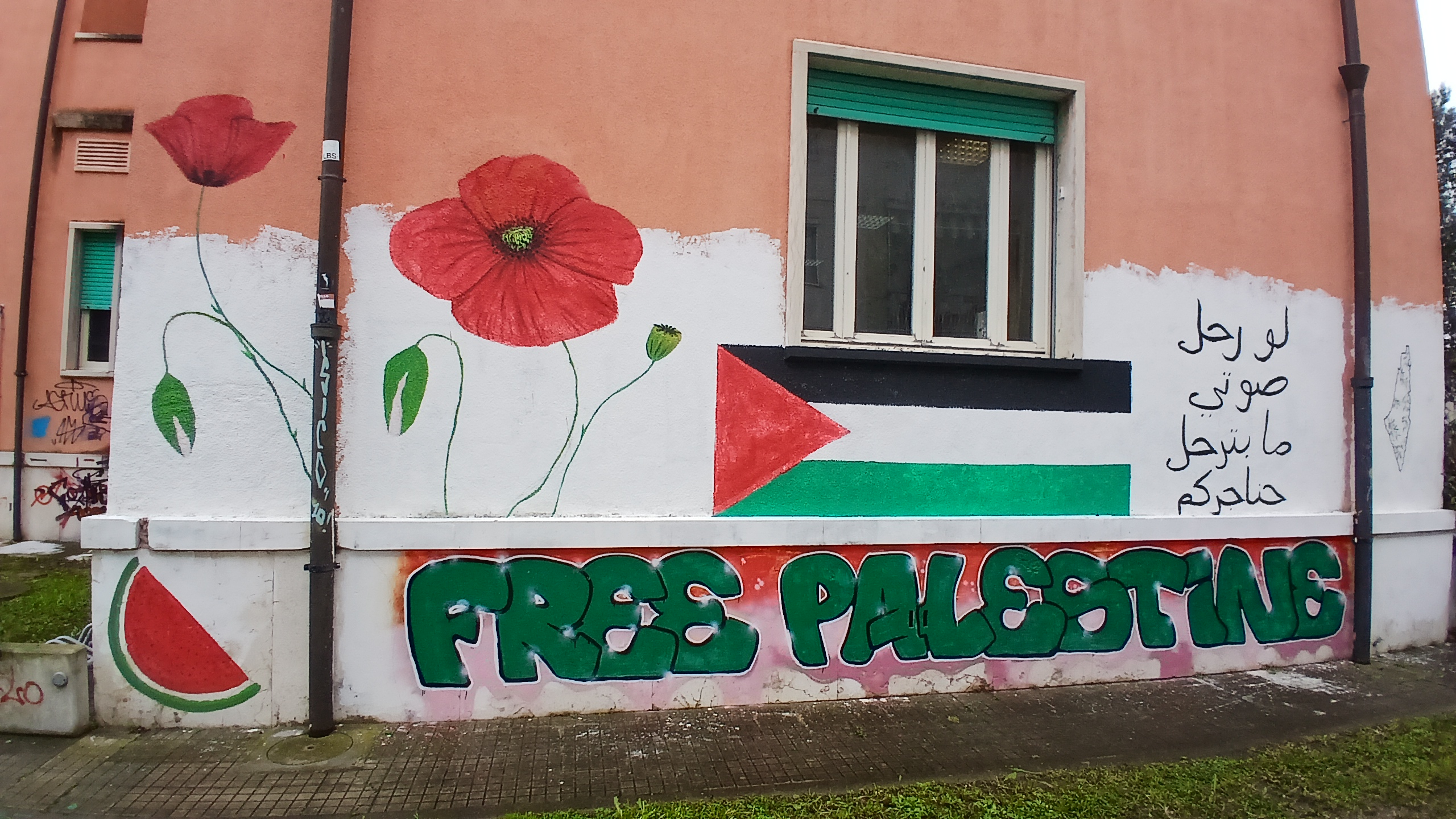
Graffiti in Italy expressing solidarity with Palestine

== Environmental effects ==
Spray paint has many negative environmental effects. The paint contains toxic chemicals, and the can uses volatile hydrocarbon gases to spray the paint onto a surface.

Volatile organic compound (VOC) leads to ground level ozone formation and most of graffiti related emissions are VOCs. A 2010 paper estimates 4,862 tons of VOCs were released in the United States in activities related to graffiti.

== Government responses ==
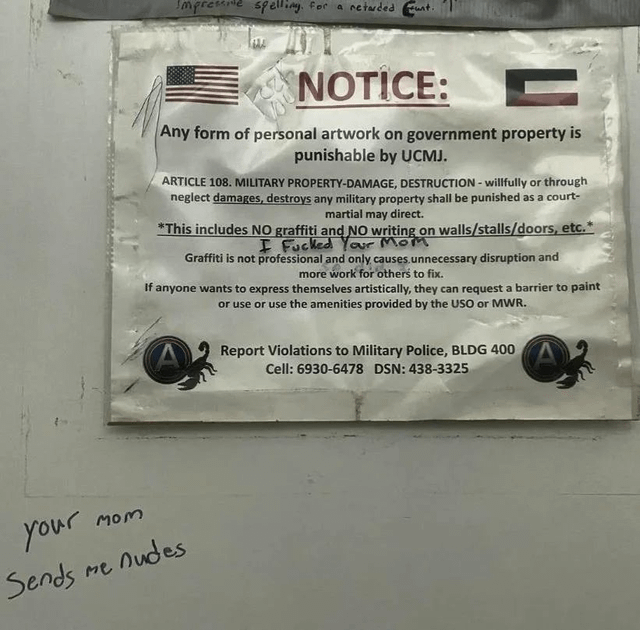
Poster at a US military base in Kuwait decrying graffiti, itself having been graffitied

=== Asia ===
In China, Mao Zedong in the 1920s used revolutionary slogans and paintings in public places to galvanize the country's communist movement.

Based on different national conditions, many people believe that China's attitude towards Graffiti is fierce, but in fact, according to Lance Crayon in his film Spray Paint Beijing: Graffiti in the Capital of China, Graffiti is generally accepted in Beijing, with artists not seeing much police interference. Political and religiously sensitive graffiti, however, is not allowed.

In Hong Kong, Tsang Tsou Choi was known as the King of Kowloon for his calligraphy graffiti over many years, in which he claimed ownership of the area. Now some of his work is preserved officially.

In Taiwan, the government has made some concessions to graffitists. Since 2005 they have been allowed to freely display their work along some sections of riverside retaining walls in designated "Graffiti Zones". From 2007, Taipei's department of cultural affairs also began permitting graffiti on fences around major public construction sites. Department head Yong-ping Lee (李永萍) stated, "We will promote graffiti starting with the public sector, and then later in the private sector too. It's our goal to beautify the city with graffiti". The government later helped organize a graffiti contest in Ximending, a popular shopping district. Graffitists caught working outside of these designated areas still face fines up to NT$6,000 under a department of environmental protection regulation. However, Taiwanese authorities can be relatively lenient, one veteran police officer stating anonymously, "Unless someone complains about vandalism, we won't get involved. We don't go after it proactively."

In 1993, after several expensive cars in Singapore were spray-painted, the police arrested a student from the Singapore American School, Michael P. Fay, questioned him, and subsequently charged him with vandalism. Fay pleaded guilty to vandalizing a car in addition to stealing road signs. Under the 1966 Vandalism Act of Singapore, originally passed to curb the spread of communist graffiti in Singapore, the court sentenced him to four months in jail, a fine of S$3,500 (US$2,233), and a caning. The New York Times ran several editorials and op-eds that condemned the punishment and called on the American public to flood the Singaporean embassy with protests. Although the Singapore government received many calls for clemency, Fay's caning took place in Singapore on 5 May 1994. Fay had originally received a sentence of six strokes of the cane, but the presiding president of Singapore, Ong Teng Cheong, agreed to reduce his caning sentence to four lashes.

In South Korea, Park Jung-soo was fined two million South Korean won by the Seoul Central District Court for spray-painting a rat on posters of the G-20 Summit a few days before the event in November 2011. Park alleged that the initial in "G-20" sounds like the Korean word for "rat", but Korean government prosecutors alleged that Park was making a derogatory statement about the president of South Korea, Lee Myung-bak, the host of the summit. This case led to public outcry and debate on the lack of government tolerance and in support of freedom of expression. The court ruled that the painting, "an ominous creature like a rat" amounts to "an organized criminal activity" and upheld the fine while denying the prosecution's request for imprisonment for Park.

Graffiti in Asia

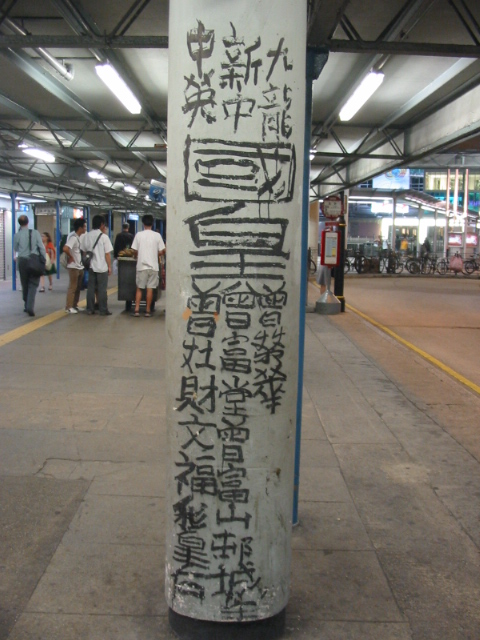
Street graffiti in Hong Kong

=== Europe ===
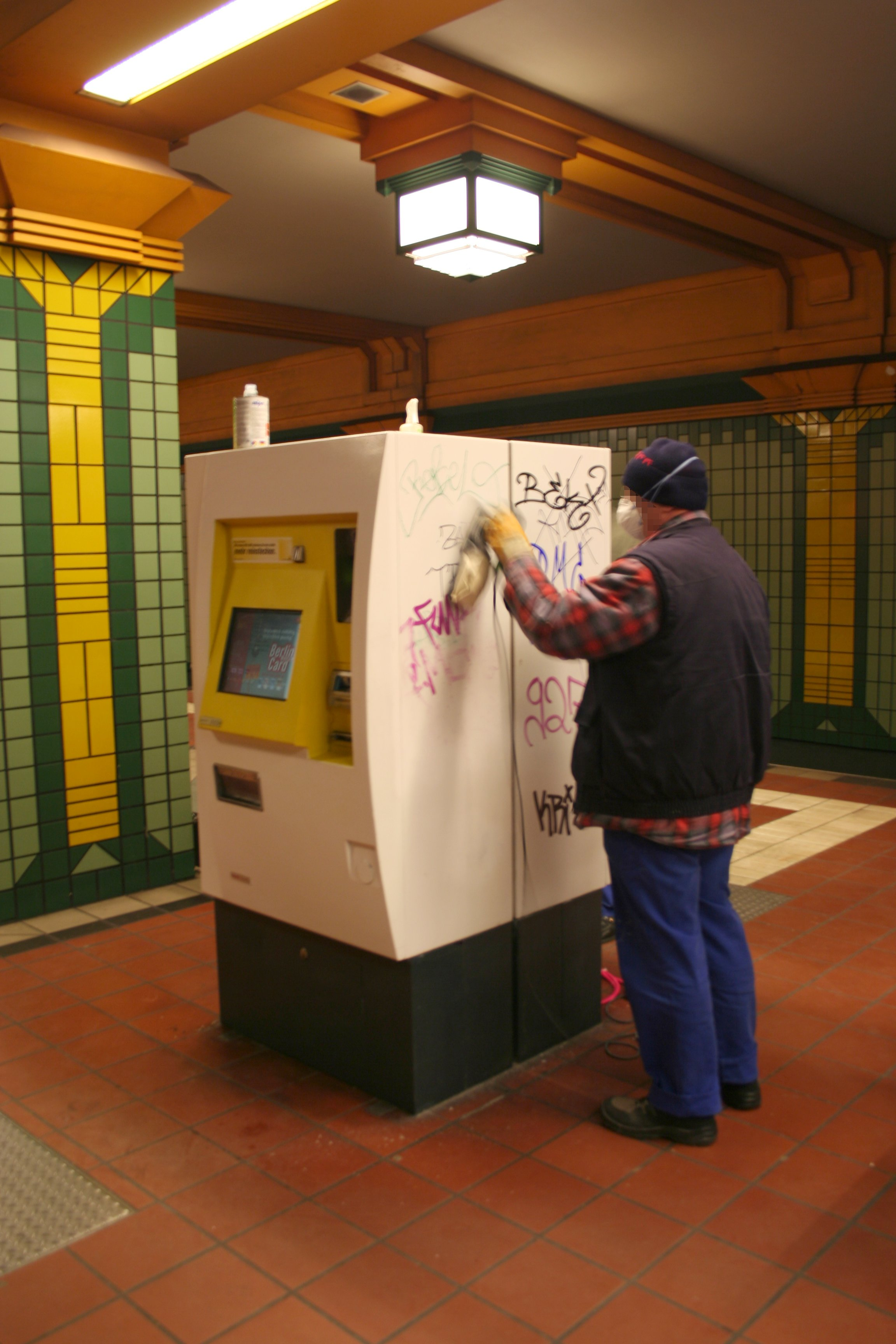
Graffiti removal in Berlin

In Europe, community cleaning squads have responded to graffiti, in some cases with reckless abandon, as when in 1992 in France a local Scout group, attempting to remove modern graffiti, damaged two prehistoric paintings of bison in the Cave of Mayrière supérieure near the French village of Bruniquel in Tarn-et-Garonne, earning them the 1992 Ig Nobel Prize in archaeology.

In September 2006, the European Parliament directed the European Commission to create urban environment policies to prevent and eliminate dirt, litter, graffiti, animal excrement, and excessive noise from domestic and vehicular music systems in European cities, along with other concerns over urban life.

In Budapest, Hungary, both a city-backed movement called I Love Budapest and a special police division tackle the problem, including the provision of approved areas.

=== United Kingdom ===
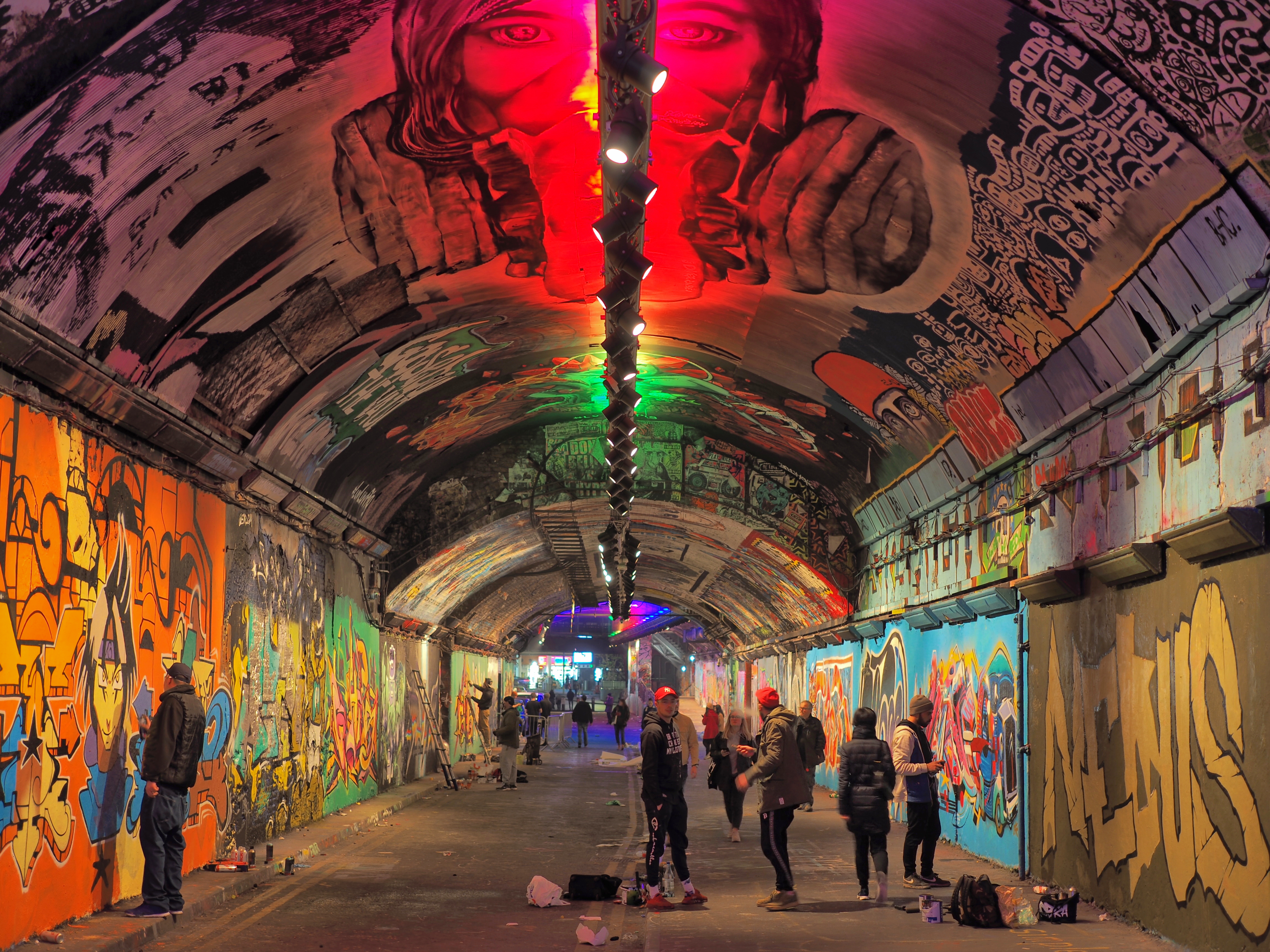
It is permitted to create graffiti in the Leake st tunnel. The tunnel runs underneath Waterloo station in London. 2019

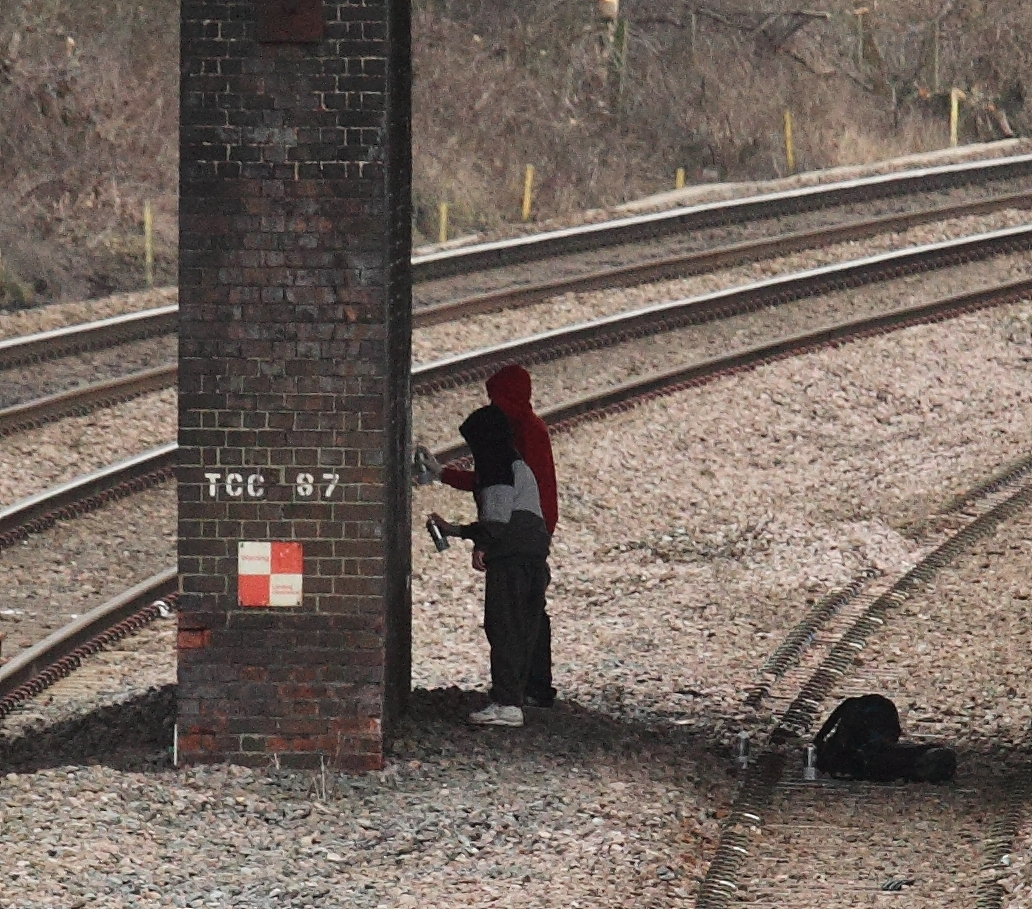
Two graffiti artists underneath the Market st bridge near Clay Cross, UK. 2010

The Anti-social Behaviour Act 2003 became Britain's latest anti-graffiti legislation. In August 2004, the Keep Britain Tidy campaign issued a press release calling for zero tolerance of graffiti and supporting proposals such as issuing "on the spot" fines to graffiti offenders and banning the sale of aerosol paint to anyone under the age of 16. The press release also condemned the use of graffiti images in advertising and in music videos, arguing that real-world experience of graffiti stood far removed from its often-portrayed "cool" or "edgy'" image.

To back the campaign, 123 Members of Parliament (MPs) (including then Prime Minister Tony Blair), signed a charter which stated: "Graffiti is not art, it's crime. On behalf of my constituents, I will do all I can to rid our community of this problem."

In the UK, city councils have the power to take action against the owner of any property that has been defaced under the Anti-social Behaviour Act 2003 (as amended by the Clean Neighbourhoods and Environment Act 2005) or, in certain cases, the Highways Act. This is often used against owners of property that are complacent in allowing protective boards to be defaced so long as the property is not damaged.

In July 2008, a conspiracy charge was used to convict graffitists for the first time. After a three-month police surveillance operation, nine members of the DPM crew were convicted of conspiracy to commit criminal damage costing at least £1 million. Five of them received prison sentences, ranging from eighteen months to two years. The unprecedented scale of the investigation and the severity of the sentences rekindled public debate over whether graffiti should be considered art or crime.

Some councils, like those of Stroud and Loerrach, provide approved areas in the town where graffitists can showcase their talents, including underpasses, car parks, and walls that might otherwise prove a target for the "spray and run".

Graffiti in Europe

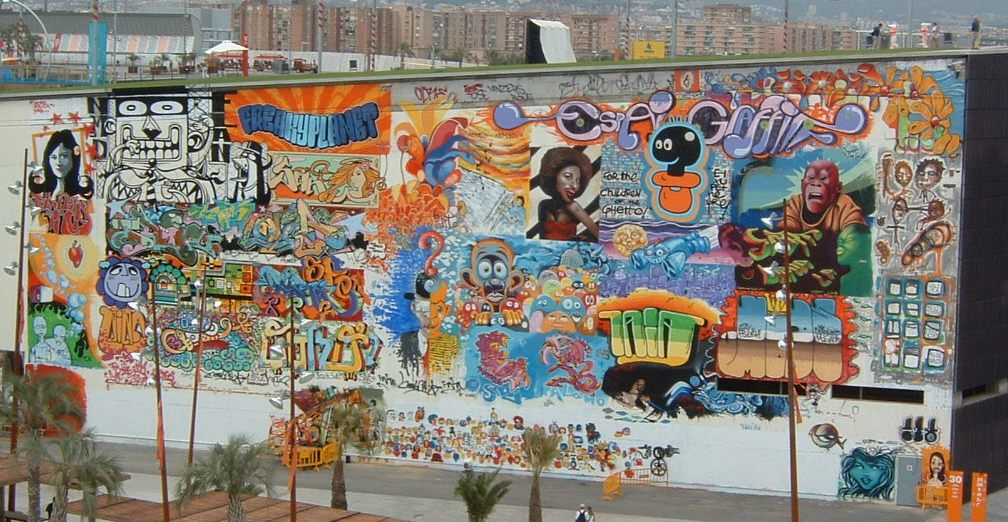
Multi-artist graffiti in Barcelona, Spain

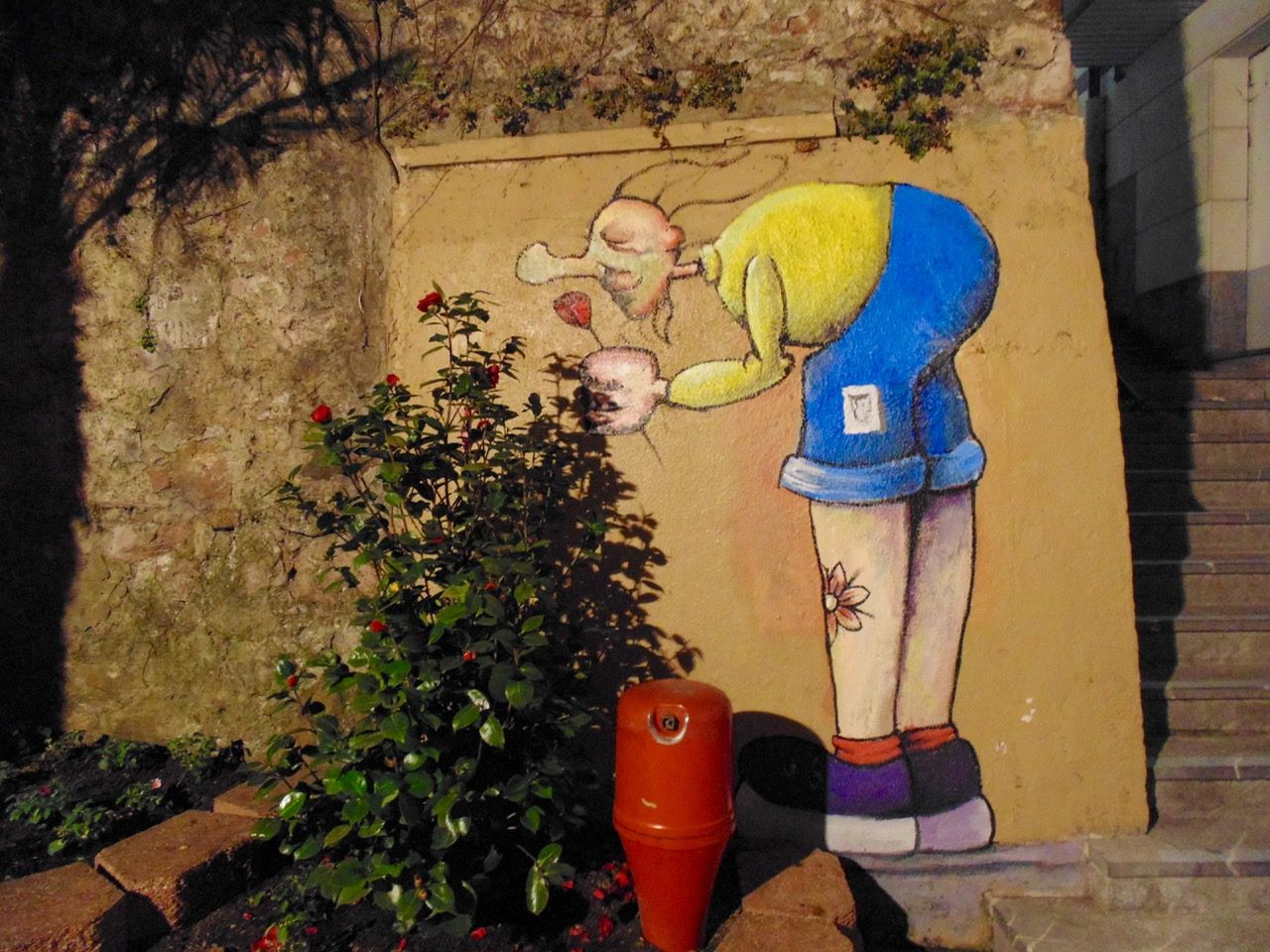
Integration of graffiti into its environment, Zumaia, Spain (2016)

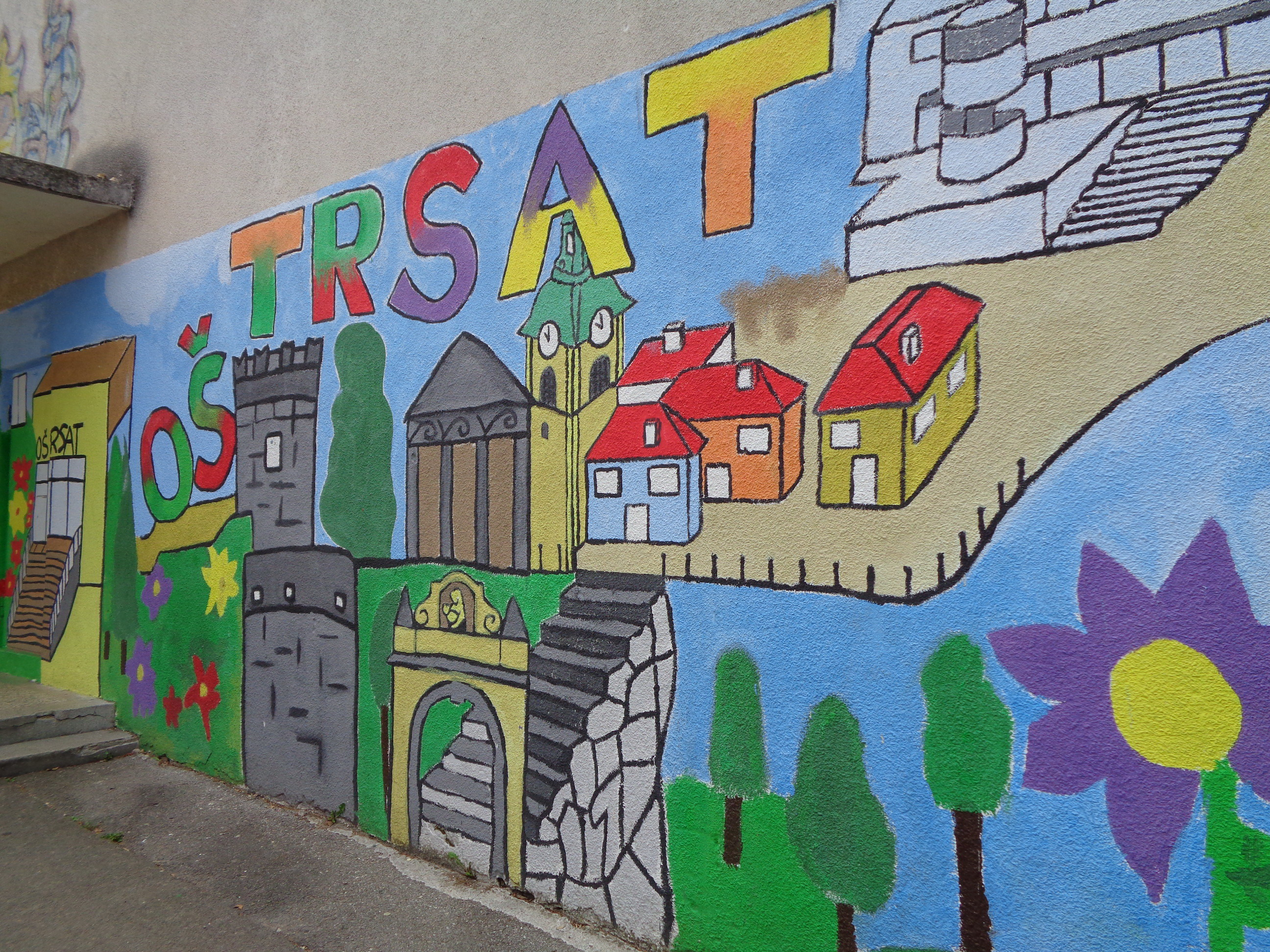
Graffiti made by school children in Rijeka, Croatia

Graffiti written in Georgian script, Tbilisi, Georgia

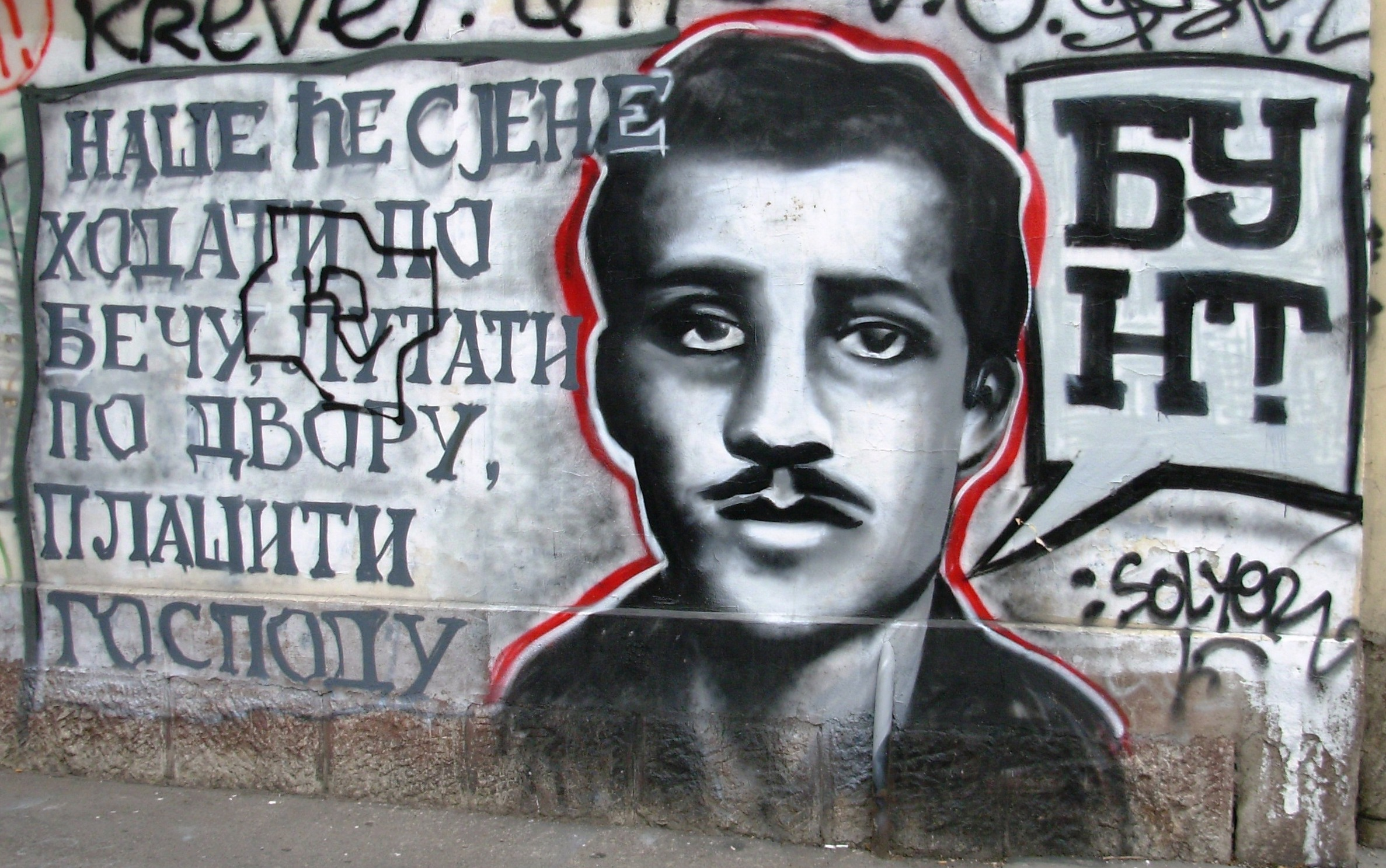
Historical graffito of Gavrilo Princip in Belgrade, Serbia

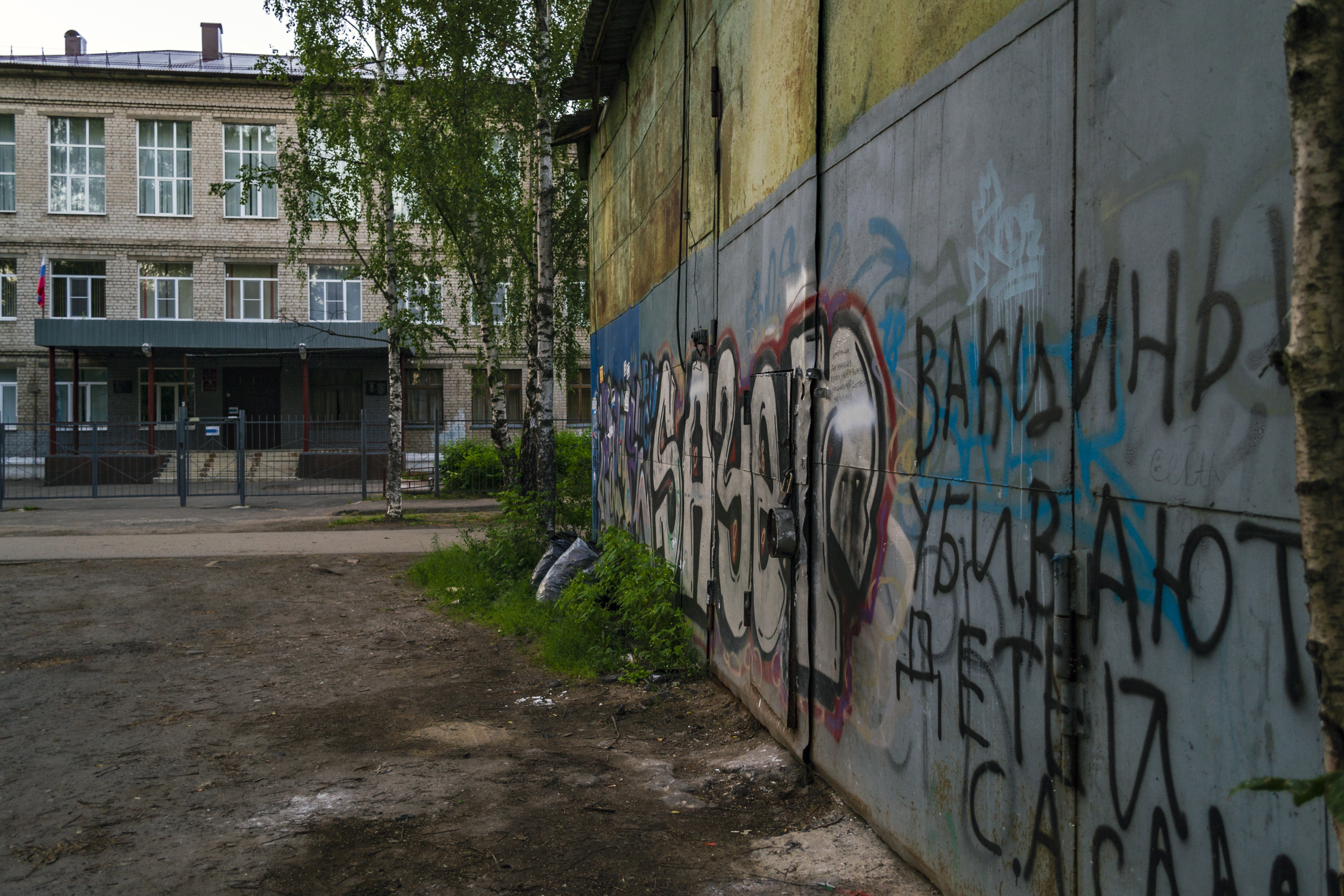
Graffiti on a garage near a school in Nizhny Novgorod, Russia

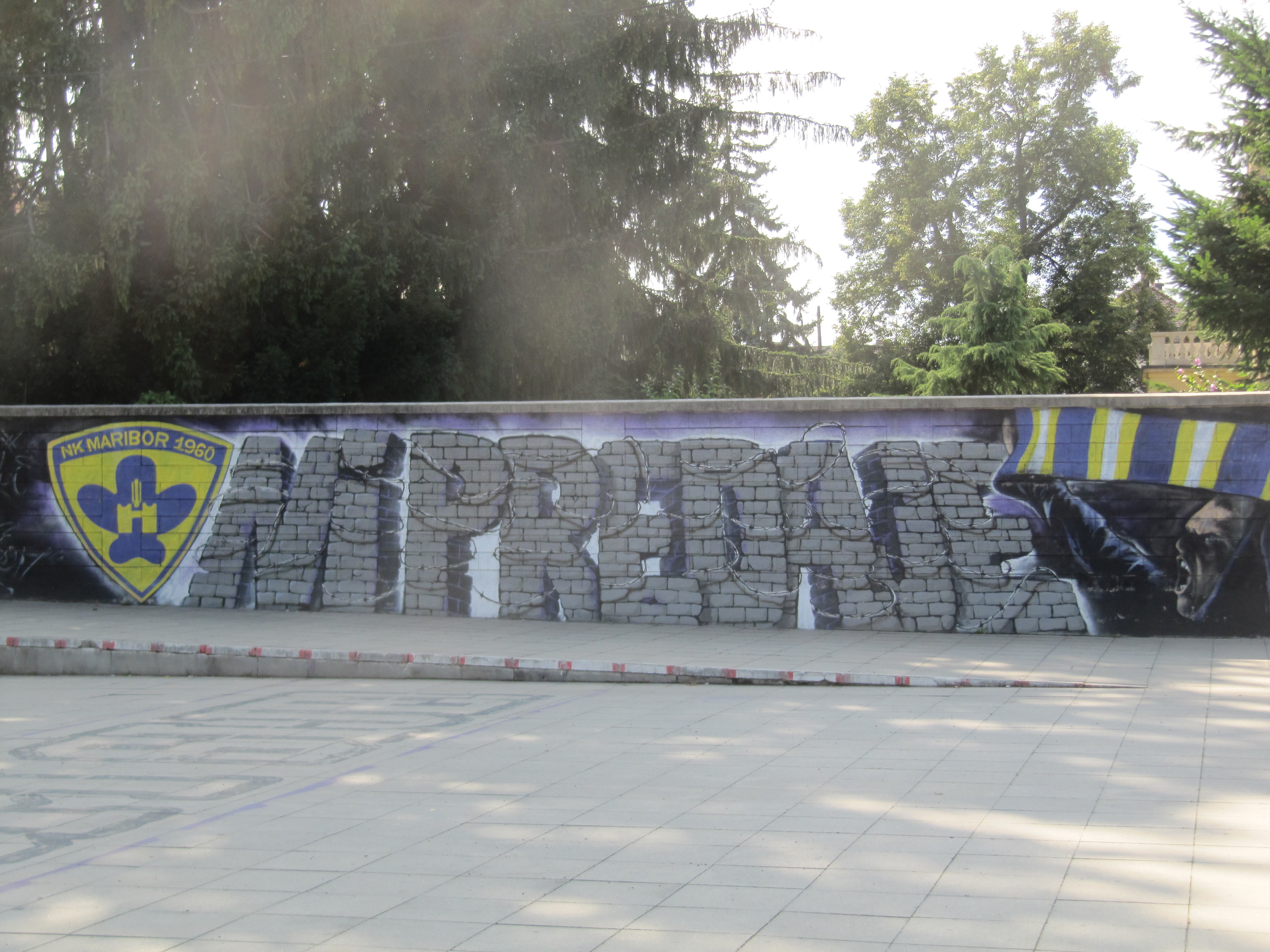
Football related graffiti in Maribor, Slovenia

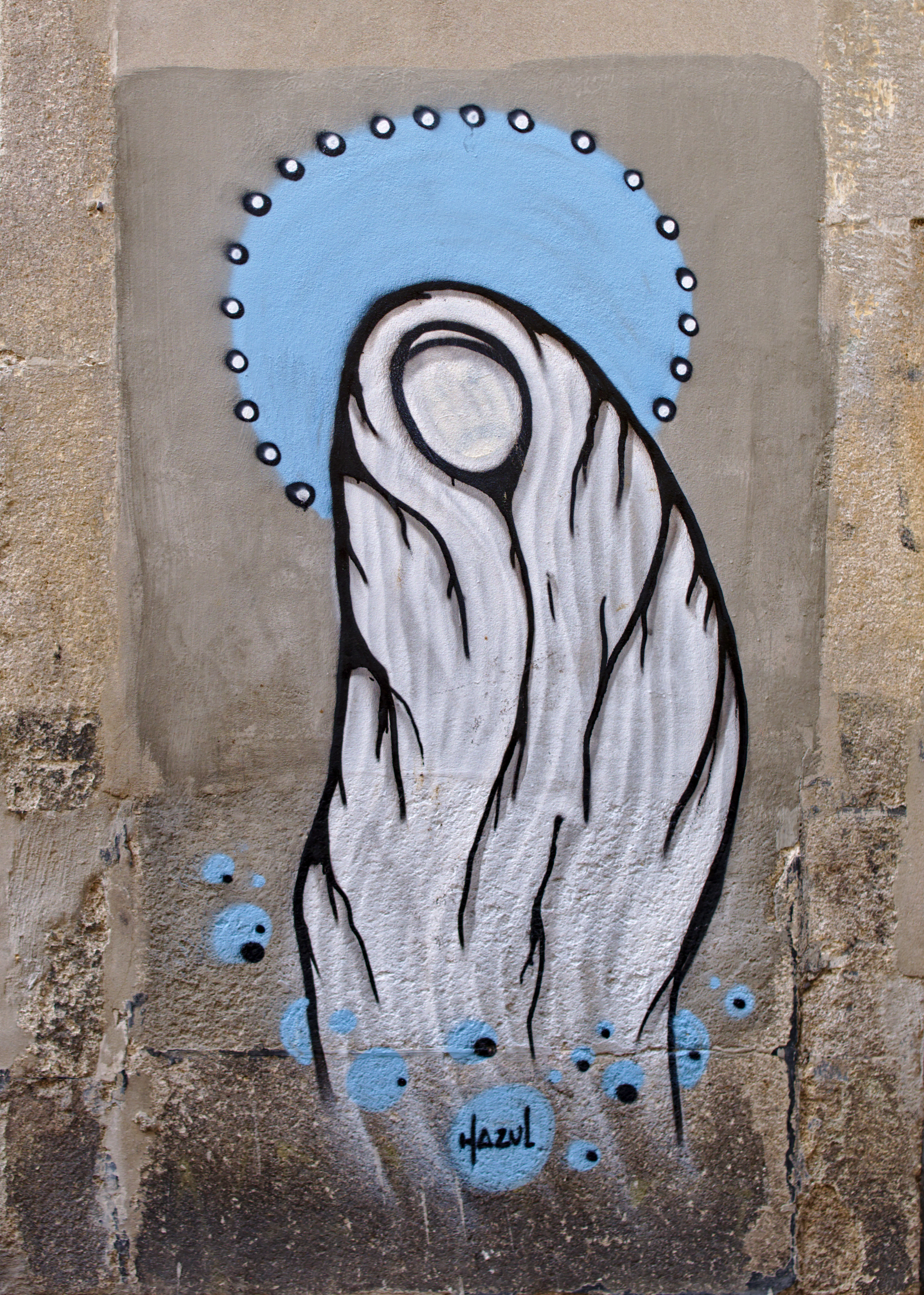
Graffiti by Hazul in Porto, Portugal

=== Australia ===
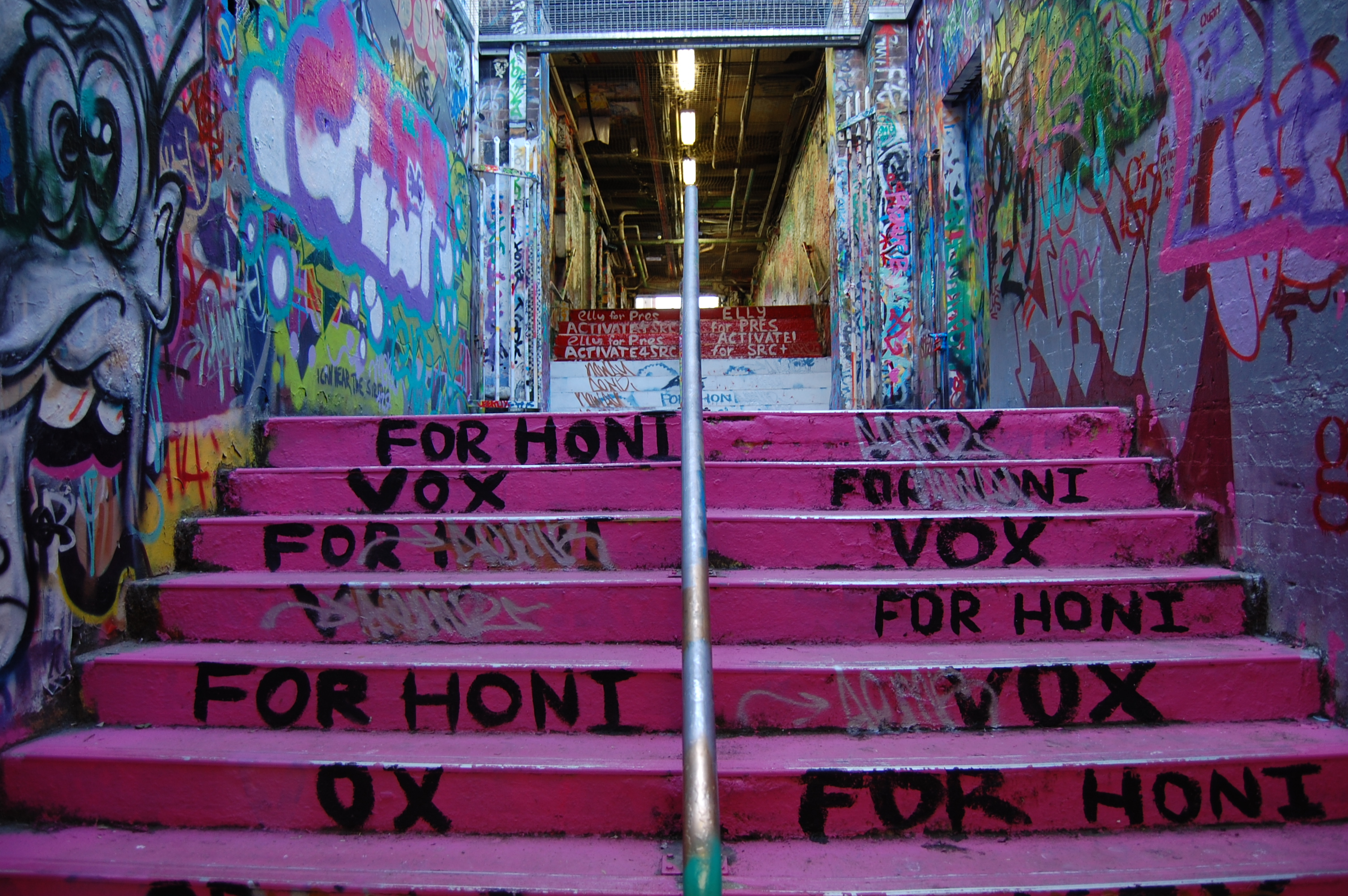
Graffiti Tunnel, University of Sydney at Camperdown (2009)

A New South Wales T set travelling express from Strathfield to the Sydney city centre with whole car graffiti on its side (2026)

Ancient rock art in Australia is seen as a sacred part of First Nations histories, and many of it is legally protected, and some are given National Heritage status.

In an effort to reduce vandalism, many cities in Australia have designated walls or areas exclusively for use by writers. One early example is the "Graffiti Tunnel" located at the Camperdown Campus of the University of Sydney, which is available for use by any student at the university to tag, advertise, poster, and paint. Advocates of this idea suggest that this discourages petty vandalism yet encourages artists to take their time and produce great art, without worry of being caught or arrested for vandalism or trespassing. Others disagree with this approach, arguing that the presence of legal graffiti walls does not demonstrably reduce illegal graffiti elsewhere. Some local government areas throughout Australia have introduced "anti-graffiti squads", who clean graffiti in the area, and such crews as BCW (Buffers Can't Win) have taken steps to keep one step ahead of local graffiti cleaners.

Many state governments have banned the sale or possession of spray paint to those under the age of 18 (age of majority). However, a number of local governments in Victoria have taken steps to recognize the cultural heritage value of some examples of graffiti, such as prominent political graffiti. Tough new graffiti laws have been introduced in Australia with fines of up to A$26,000 and two years in prison.

Melbourne is a prominent graffiti city of Australia with many of its lanes being tourist attractions, such as Hosier Lane in particular, a popular destination for photographers, wedding photography, and backdrops for corporate print advertising. The Lonely Planet travel guide cites Melbourne's street as a major attraction. All forms of graffiti, including sticker art, poster, stencil art, and wheatpasting, can be found in many places throughout the city. Prominent street art precincts include; Fitzroy, Collingwood, Northcote, Brunswick, St Kilda, and the CBD, where stencil and sticker art is prominent. As one moves farther away from the city, mostly along suburban train lines, graffiti tags become more prominent. Many international artists such as Banksy have left their work in Melbourne and in early 2008 a perspex screen was installed to prevent a Banksy stencil art piece from being destroyed, it has survived since 2003 through the respect of local street artists avoiding posting over it, although it has recently had paint tipped over it.

=== New Zealand ===
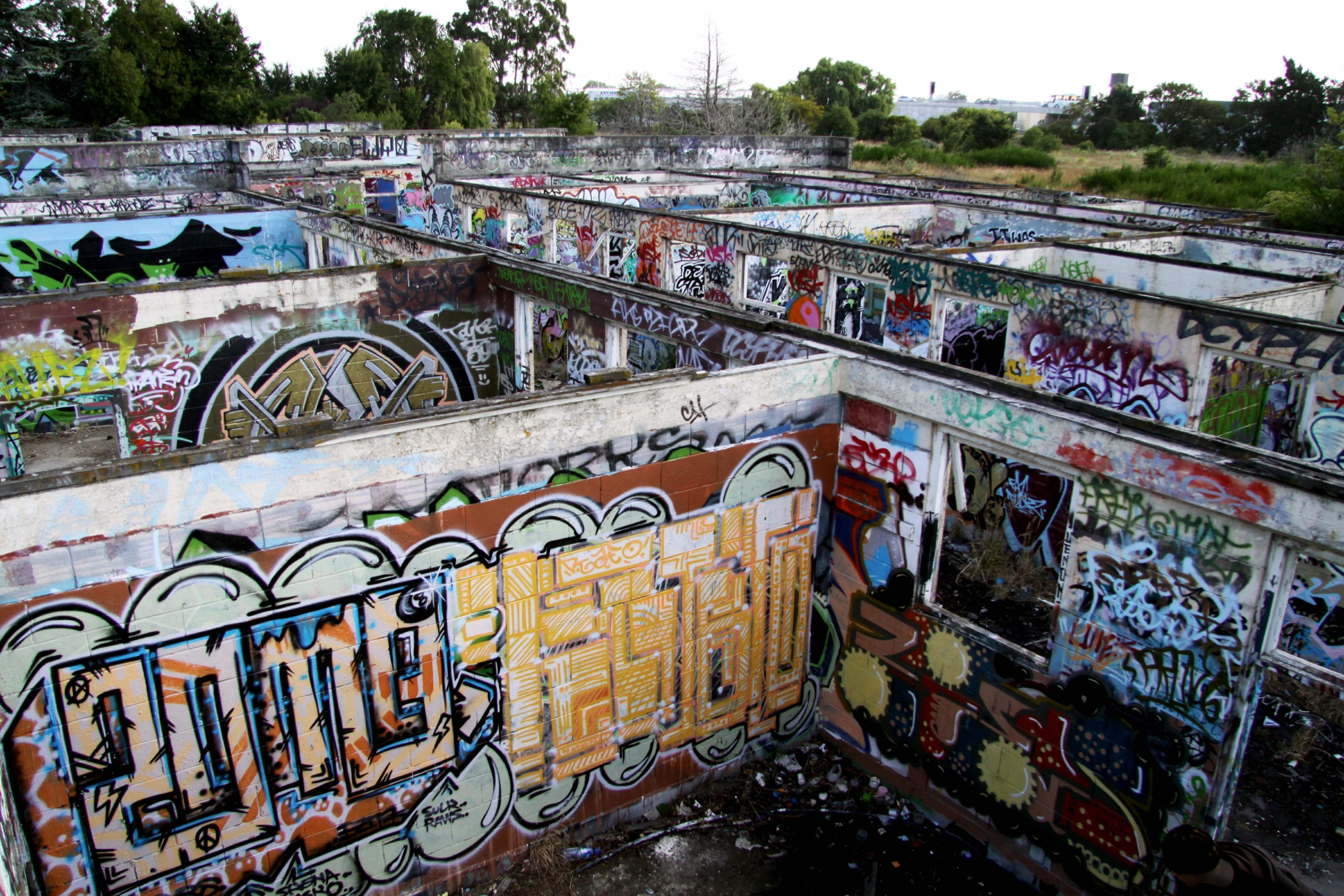
Former Christchurch stock yards

In February 2008 Helen Clark, the New Zealand prime minister at that time, announced a government crackdown on tagging and other forms of graffiti vandalism, describing it as a destructive crime representing an invasion of public and private property. New legislation subsequently adopted included a ban on the sale of paint spray cans to persons under 18 and increases in maximum fines for the offence from NZ$200 to NZ$2,000 or extended community service. The issue of tagging become a widely debated one following an incident in Auckland during January 2008 in which a middle-aged property owner stabbed one of two teenage taggers to death and was subsequently convicted of manslaughter.

=== United States ===
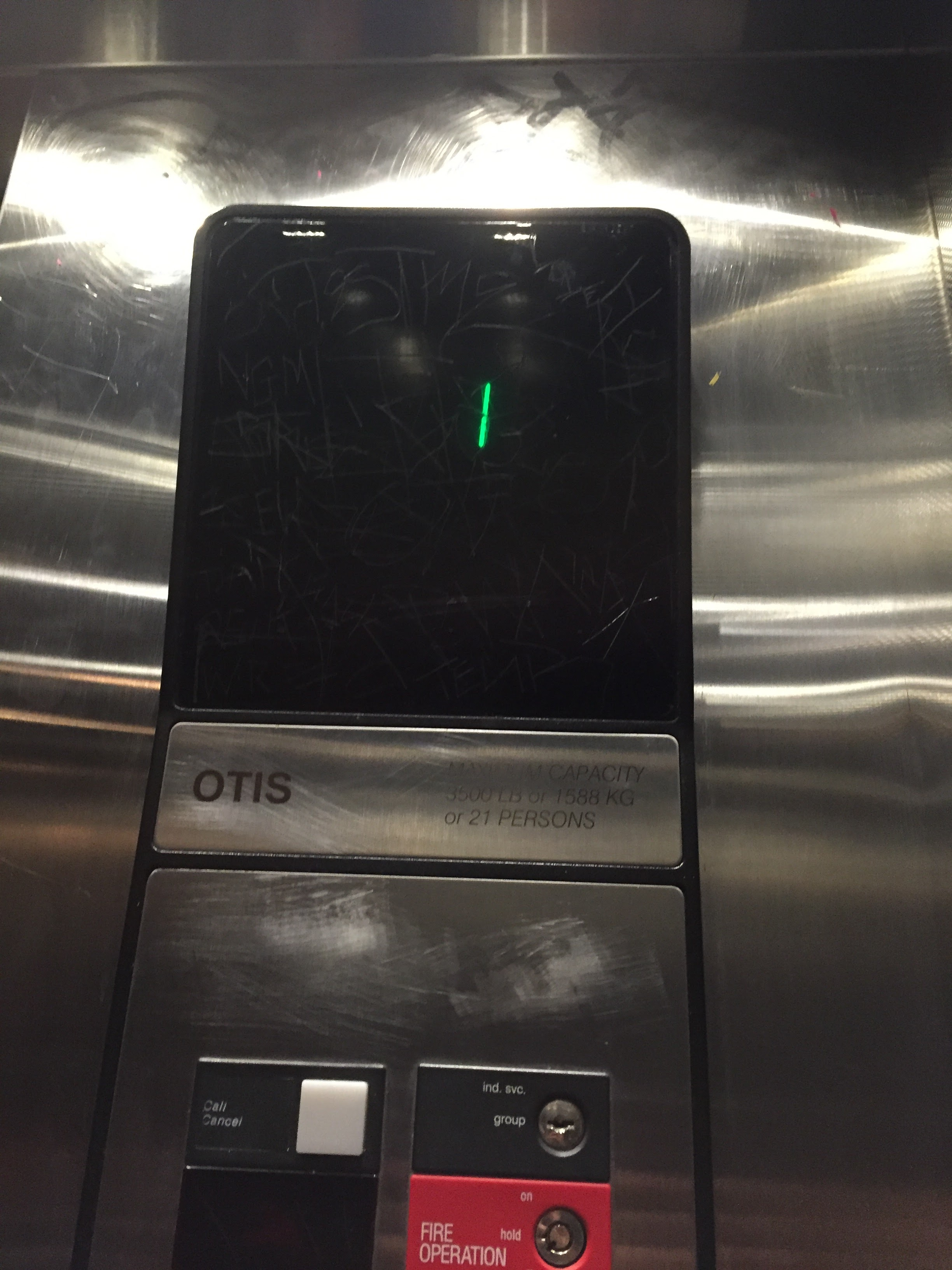
An elevator position indicator with scratch graffiti

==== Tracker databases ====
Graffiti databases have increased in the past decade because they allow vandalism incidents to be fully documented against an offender and help the police and prosecution charge and prosecute offenders for multiple counts of vandalism. They also provide law enforcement the ability to rapidly search for an offender's moniker or tag in a simple, effective, and comprehensive way. These systems can also help track costs of damage to a city to help allocate an anti-graffiti budget. The theory is that when an offender is caught putting up graffiti, they are not just charged with one count of vandalism; they can be held accountable for all the other damage for which they are responsible. This has two main benefits for law enforcement. One, it sends a signal to the offenders that their vandalism is being tracked. Two, a city can seek restitution from offenders for all the damage that they have committed, not merely a single incident. These systems give law enforcement personnel real-time, street-level intelligence that allows them not only to focus on the worst graffiti offenders and their damage, but also to monitor potential gang violence that is associated with the graffiti.

==== Gang injunctions ====
Many restrictions of civil gang injunctions are designed to help address and protect the physical environment and limit graffiti. Provisions of gang injunctions include things such as restricting the possession of marker pens, spray paint cans, or other sharp objects capable of defacing private or public property; spray painting, or marking with marker pens, scratching, applying stickers, or otherwise applying graffiti on any public or private property, including, but not limited to the street, alley, residences, block walls, and fences, vehicles or any other real or personal property. Some injunctions contain wording that restricts damaging or vandalizing both public and private property, including but not limited to any vehicle, light fixture, door, fence, wall, gate, window, building, street sign, utility box, telephone box, tree, or power pole.

==== Hotlines and reward programs ====
To help address many of these issues, many local jurisdictions have set up graffiti abatement hotlines, where citizens can call in and report vandalism and have it removed. San Diego's hotline receives more than 5,000 calls per year, in addition to reporting the graffiti, callers can learn more about prevention. One of the complaints about these hotlines is the response time; there is often a lag time between a property owner calling about the graffiti and its removal. The length of delay should be a consideration for any jurisdiction planning on operating a hotline. Local jurisdictions must convince the callers that their complaint of vandalism will be a priority and cleaned off right away. If the jurisdiction does not have the resources to respond to complaints in a timely manner, the value of the hotline diminishes. Crews must be able to respond to individual service calls made to the graffiti hotline as well as focus on cleanup near schools, parks, and major intersections and transit routes to have the biggest impact. Some cities offer a reward for information leading to the arrest and prosecution of suspects for tagging or graffiti related vandalism. The amount of the reward is based on the information provided, and the action taken.

==== Search warrants ====
When police obtain search warrants in connection with a vandalism investigation, they are often seeking judicial approval to look for items such as cans of spray paint and nozzles from other kinds of aerosol sprays; etching tools, or other sharp or pointed objects, which could be used to etch or scratch glass and other hard surfaces; permanent marking pens, markers, or paint sticks; evidence of membership or affiliation with any gang or tagging crew; paraphernalia including any reference to "(tagger's name)"; any drawings, writing, objects, or graffiti depicting taggers' names, initials, logos, monikers, slogans, or any mention of tagging crew membership; and any newspaper clippings relating to graffiti crime.

Graffiti in the United States

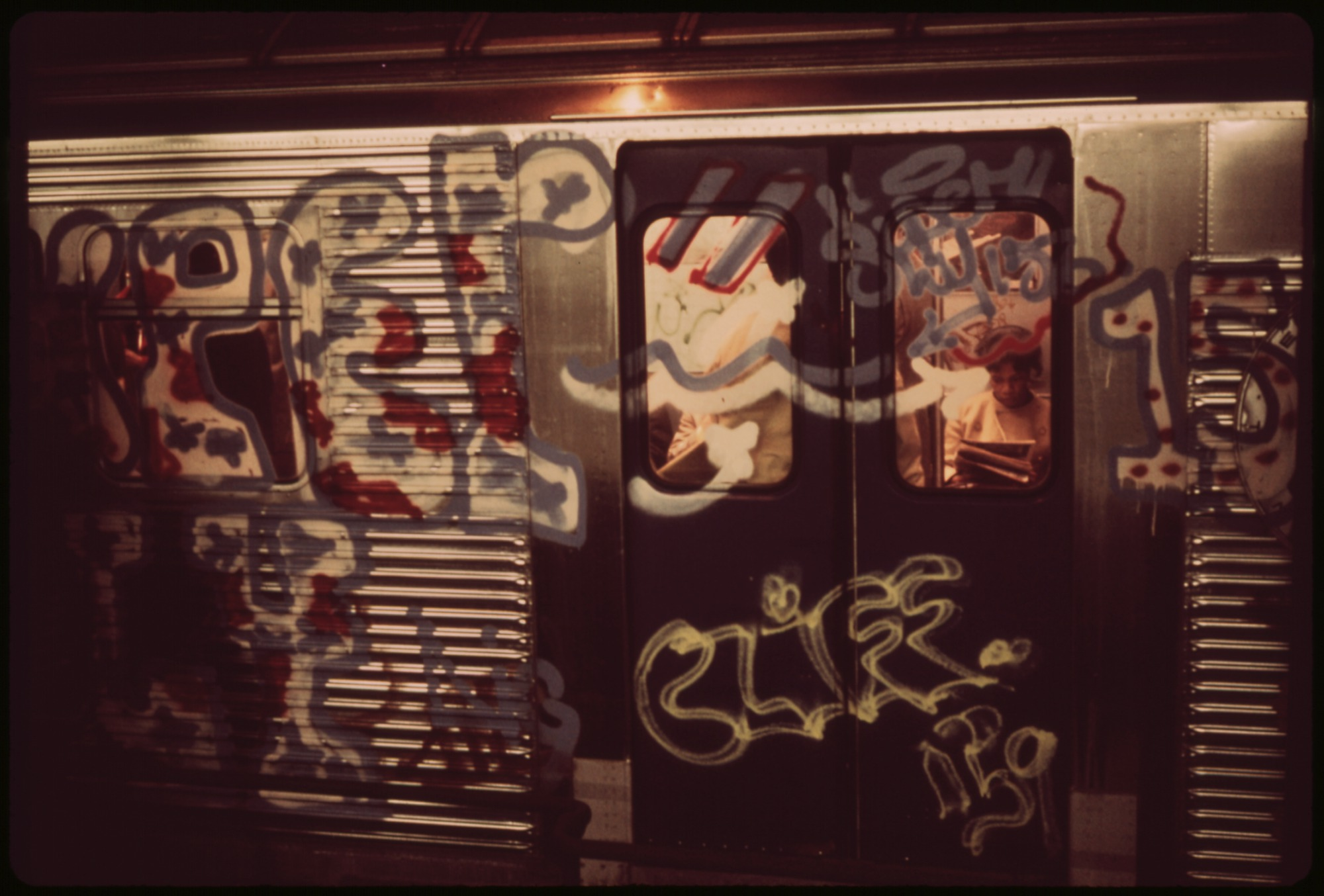
Rampant graffiti hampers visibility into and out of New York City Subway cars (1973).

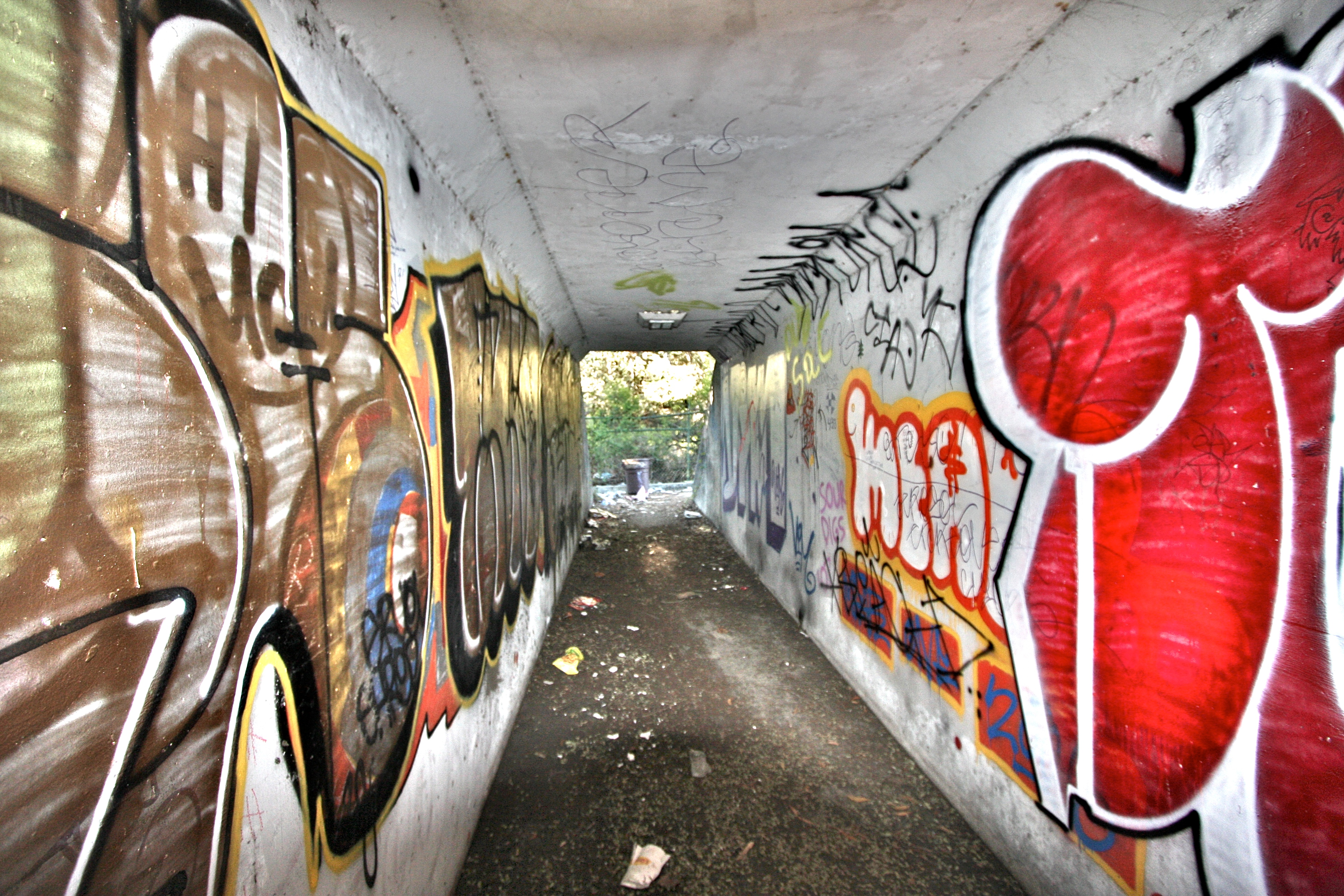
Graffiti-lined tunnel in San Francisco

Graffiti in Los Angeles (2006)

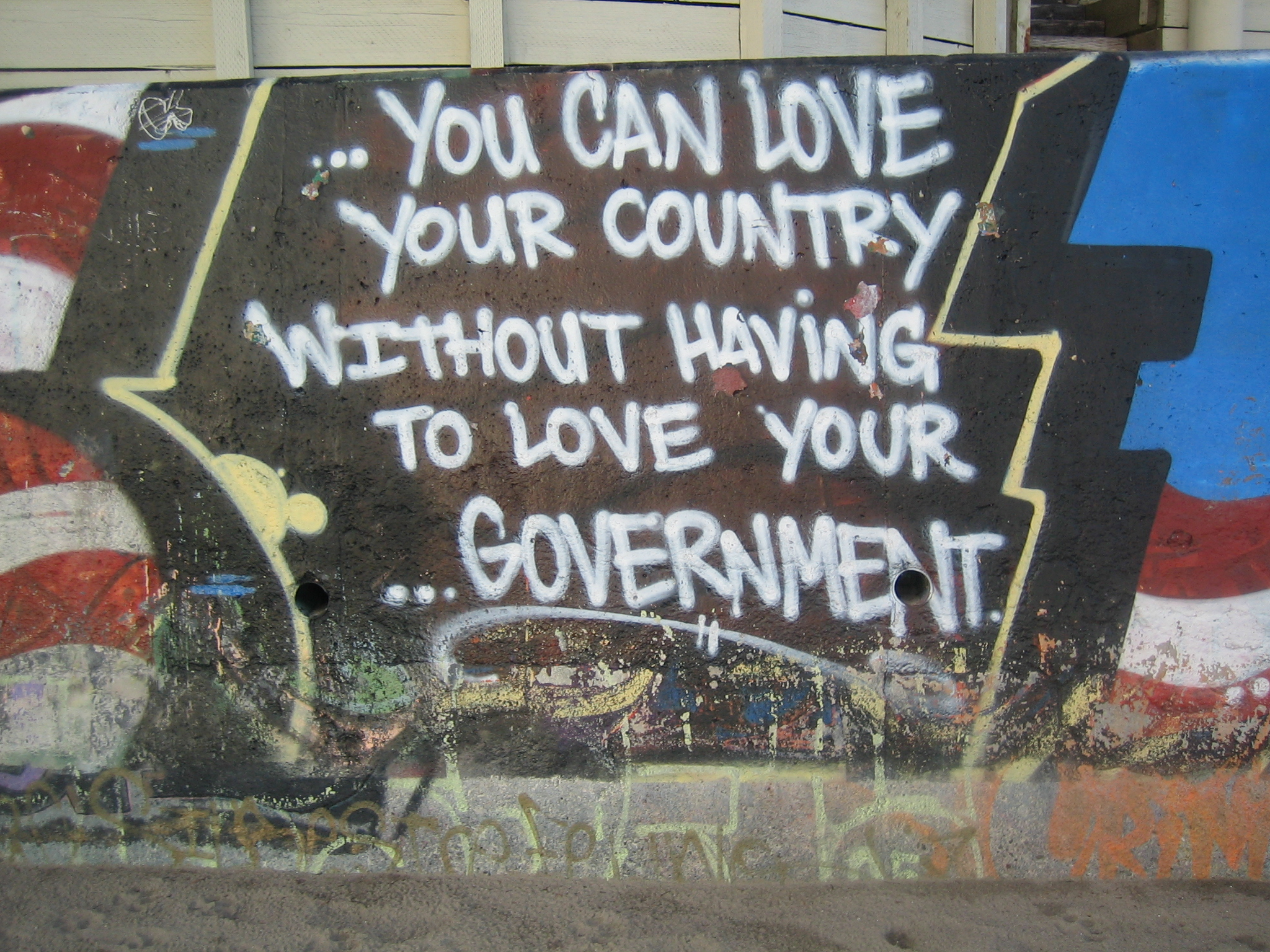
Anti-governmental graffiti in Bolinas, California

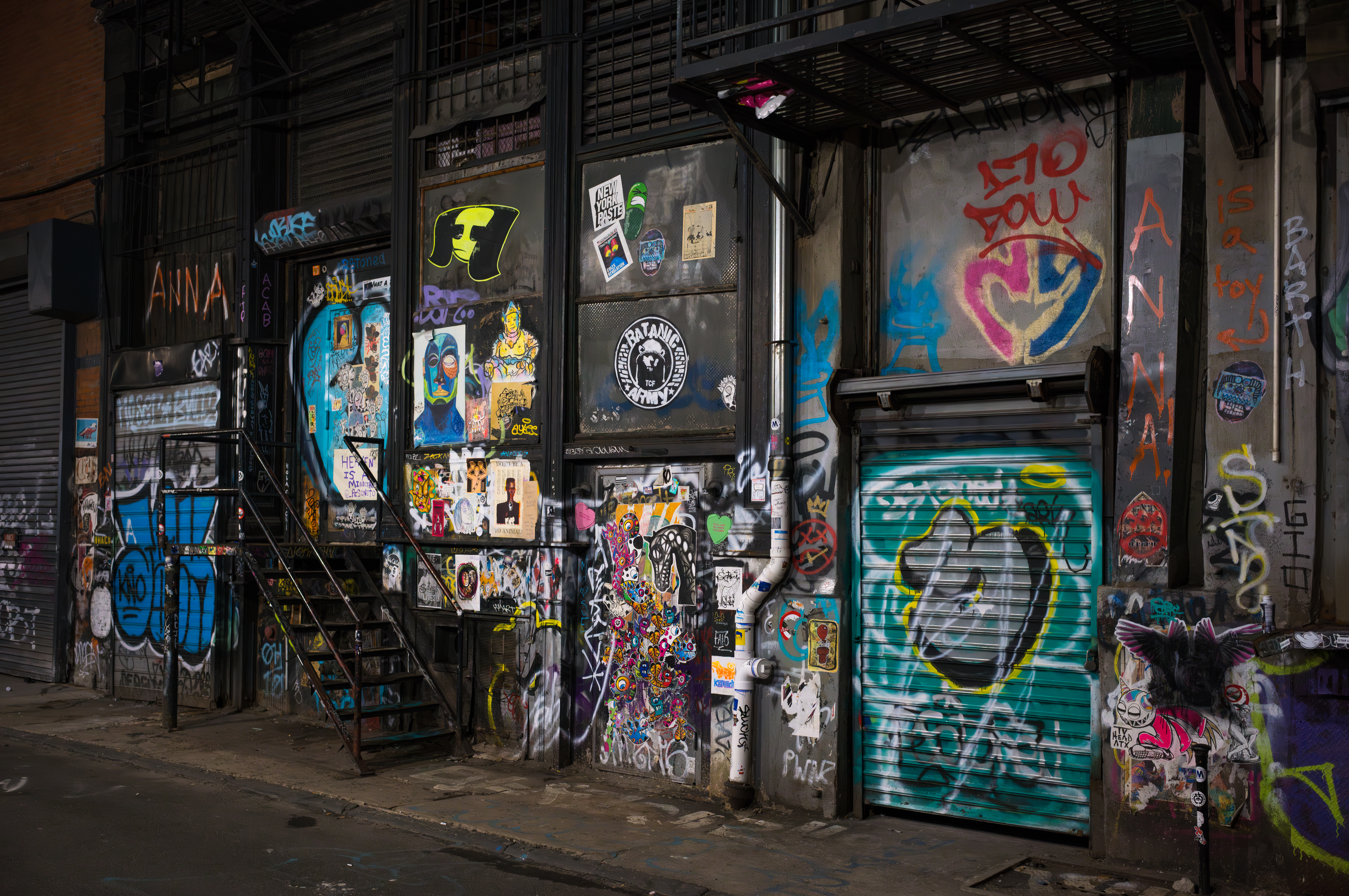
Graffiti in Cortlandt Alley, Tribeca, Lower Manhattan (2023)

== In media ==
=== Documentaries ===
- 80 Blocks from Tiffany's (1979), a rare glimpse of the late 1970s in New York City toward the end of the notorious South Bronx gangs, the documentary shows many aspects of the South Bronx's predominantly Puerto Rican community, including reformed gang members, current gang members, the police, and the community leaders who try to reach out to them.
- Stations of the Elevated (1980), the earliest documentary about subway graffiti in New York City, with music by Charles Mingus
- Style Wars (1983), an early documentary on hip-hop culture, made in New York City
- Piece by Piece (2005), a feature-length documentary on the history of San Francisco graffiti from the early 1980s
- Infamy (2005), a feature-length documentary about graffiti culture as told through the experiences of six well-known graffiti writers and a graffiti buffer
- NEXT: A Primer on Urban Painting (2005), a documentary about global graffiti culture
- RASH (2005), a feature documentary about Melbourne, Australia, and the artists who make it a living host for street art
- Jisoe (2007), a glimpse into the life of a Melbourne, Australia, graffiti writer shows the audience an example of graffiti in struggling Melbourne Areas.
- Roadsworth: Crossing the Line (2009), about Montréal artist Peter Gibson and his controversial stencil art on public roads
- Exit Through The Gift Shop (2010) was produced by the notorious artist Banksy. It tells the story of Thierry Guetta, a French immigrant in Los Angeles, and his obsession with street art; Shepard Fairey and Invader, whom Guetta discovers is his cousin, are also in the film.
- Still on and non the wiser (2011) is a ninety-minute-long documentation that accompanies the exhibition with the same name in the Kunsthalle Barmen of the Von der Heydt-Museum in Wuppertal (Germany). It draws vivid portrayals of the artists by means of very personal interviews and also catches the creation process of the works before the exhibition was opened.
- Graffiti Wars (2011), a documentary detailing King Robbo's feud with Banksy as well as the authorities' differing attitude towards graffiti and street art
- Spiritual Letters (2021), a German documentary film by Mr. Paradox Paradise about urban art and interventions in public space

=== Dramas ===
- Wild Style (1983), about hip-hop and graffiti culture in New York City
- Turk 182 (1985), about graffiti as political activism
- Bomb the System (2002), about a crew of graffitists in modern-day New York City
- Quality of Life (2004) was shot in the Mission District of San Francisco, co-written by and starring a retired graffiti writer.
- Wholetrain (2006), a German film

== Accidents ==
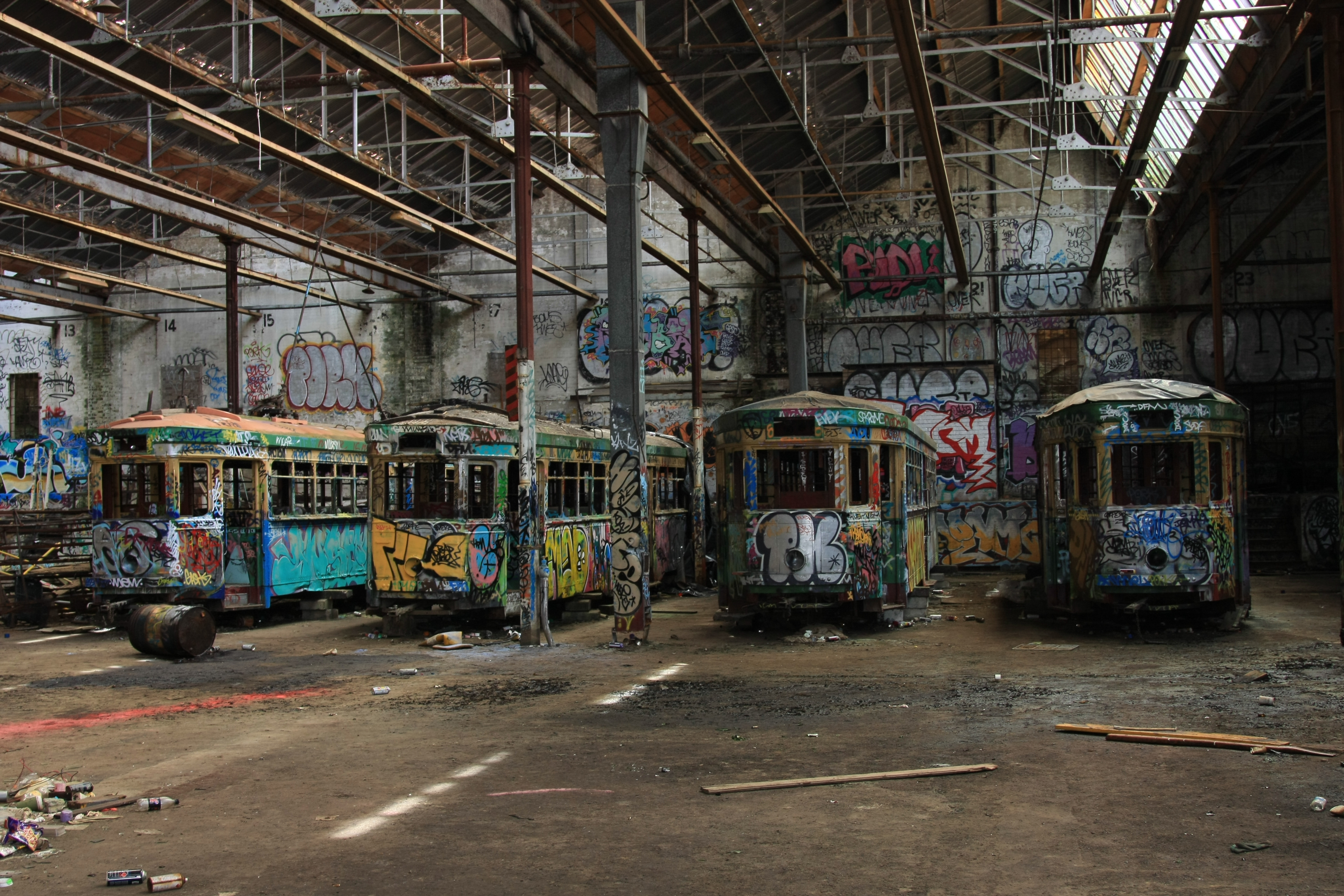
An abandoned tram depot in Sydney. Abandoned structures often have hazards such as unstable floors, roofs, walls and stray voltage. 2010

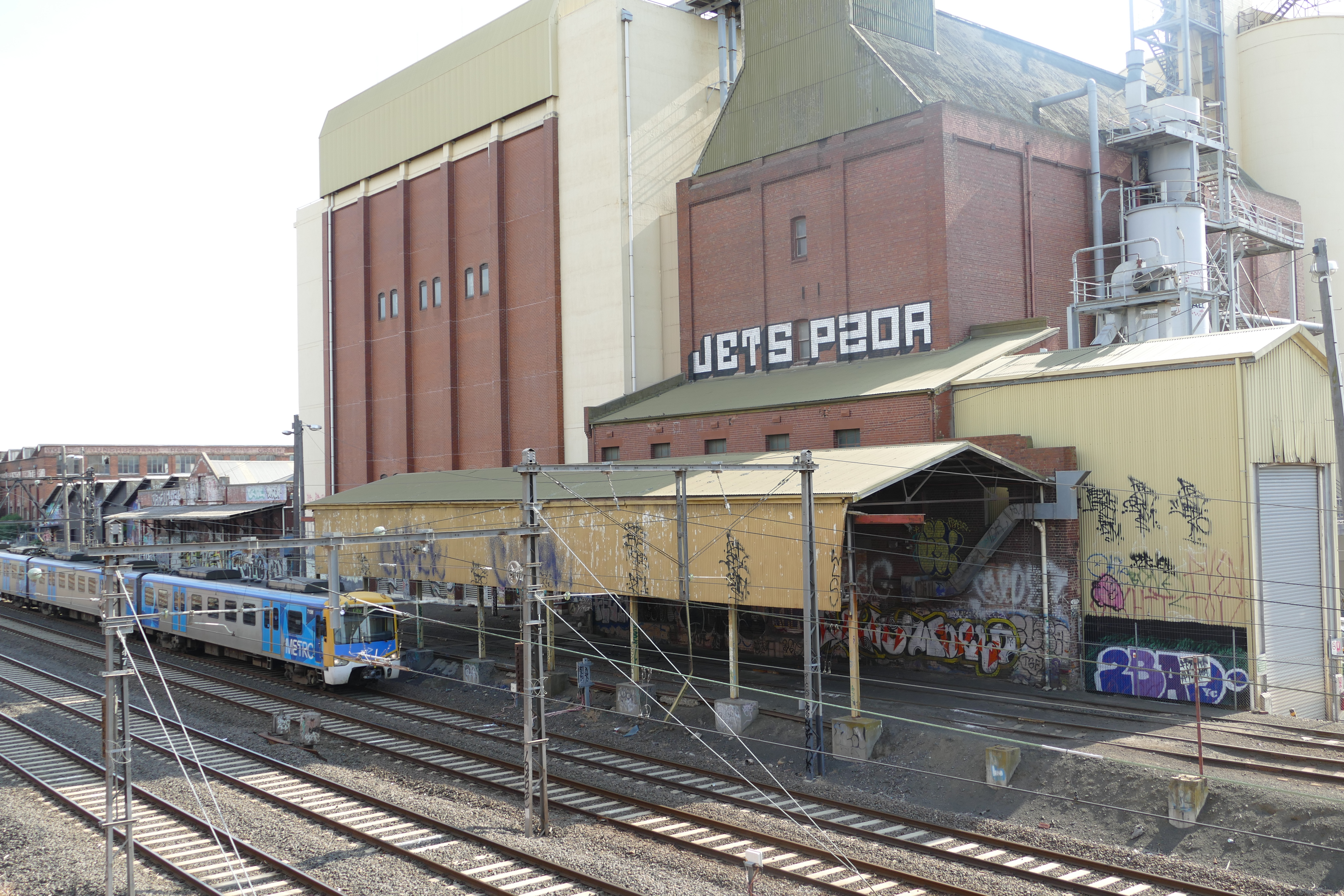
Tags that appear on the side of this building have occurred when people climbed onto the roof of parked train cars. Overhead power lines on the roofs of trains can create electric arcs that will give a person an electric shock from a distance of up to 1.5 metres. Melbourne, Australia. 2020

Common accidents that occur with graffiti include collisions with moving trains, people being electrocuted by overhead power lines and live third-rails, people falling from moving trains, collisions with cars alongside roads, falling from height and electric shocks from electricity transformers.

Overhead power lines on railways are also able to create an electric arc and it has been commented that "Importantly, electrocution may occur even in the absence of direct contact, as high voltage arcs can discharge through the air and cause devastating injuries." In 2013 Julius Gerhardt was spraying graffiti on freight carriages when he climbed on top of a carriage intending to tag a bridge. He was holding a spray can in his right hand, and an electric arc jumped over to the spray can and went through his hand, arm, and chest, then exited out of his right foot. He lost consciousness and was then lifted up and carried to a street by the people with him. He was in a coma in hospital for 36 hours, and then later put into a medically induced coma for a week. He received burns to over 90% of his body. He commented that "I didn't know about arcs. In the arc, like lightning, electricity is conducted through the air. I had the spray can in my right hand. When I raised my hand, the metal became an antenna. The air transmitted the voltage—and I flew off the train car."

At the Munich Department of Cultural Affairs official guide to graffiti it comments on the risks that occur when creating graffiti along railway tracks "Apart from the difficulty of finding your bearings in the dark, on paths not intended for your use, and the danger of getting caught in the switches of the tracks, the biggest threat by far is posed by incoming trains. Even experienced sprayers sometimes misjudge these risks, which regularly leads to fatal accidents. Likewise, coming into contact or even just close proximity to the power lines (electric arc) located next to the tracks or above the trains can have lethal consequences in a matter of seconds."

== Gallery ==
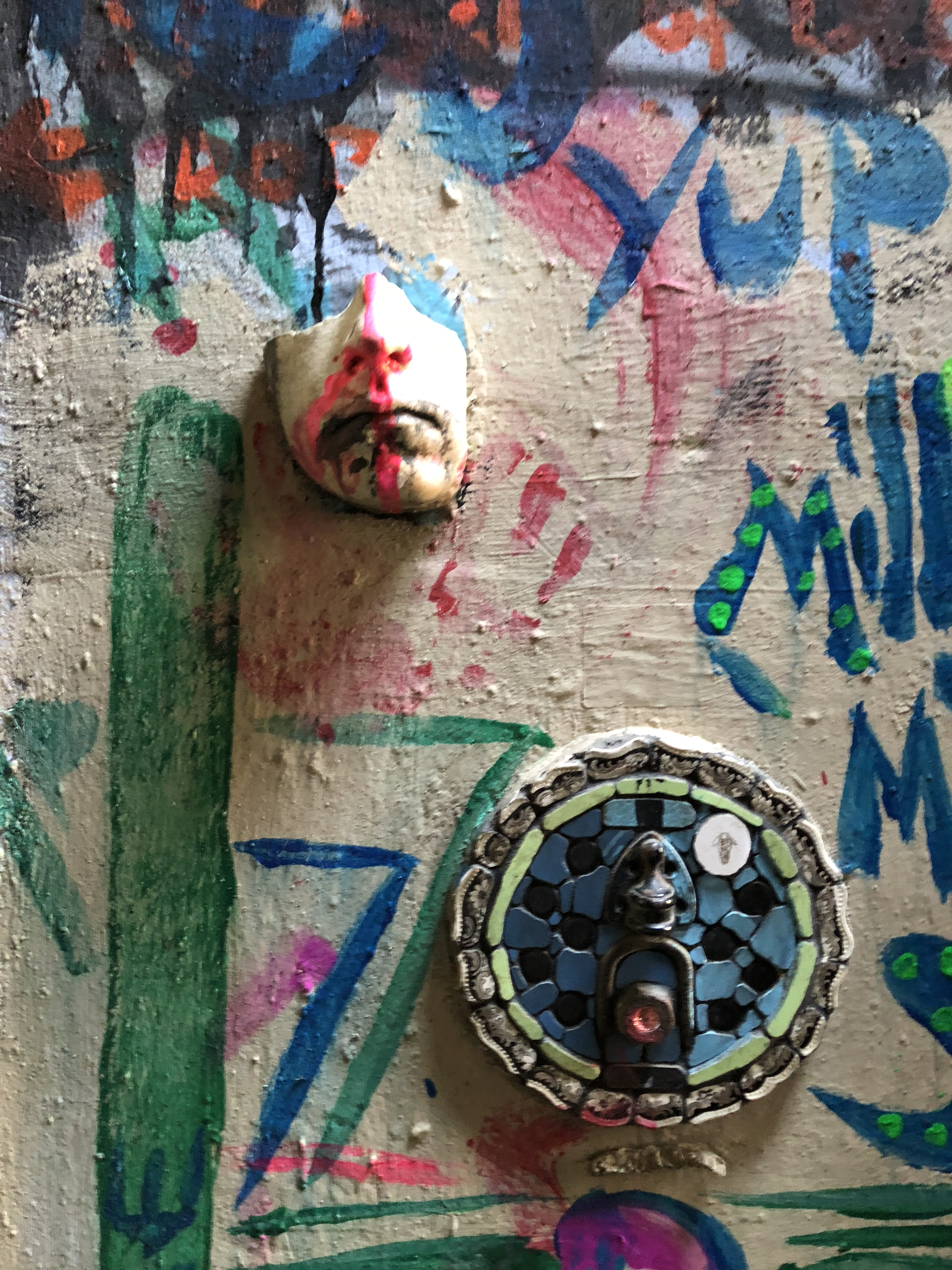
Graffiti and street art in Bristol, United Kingdom. 2018

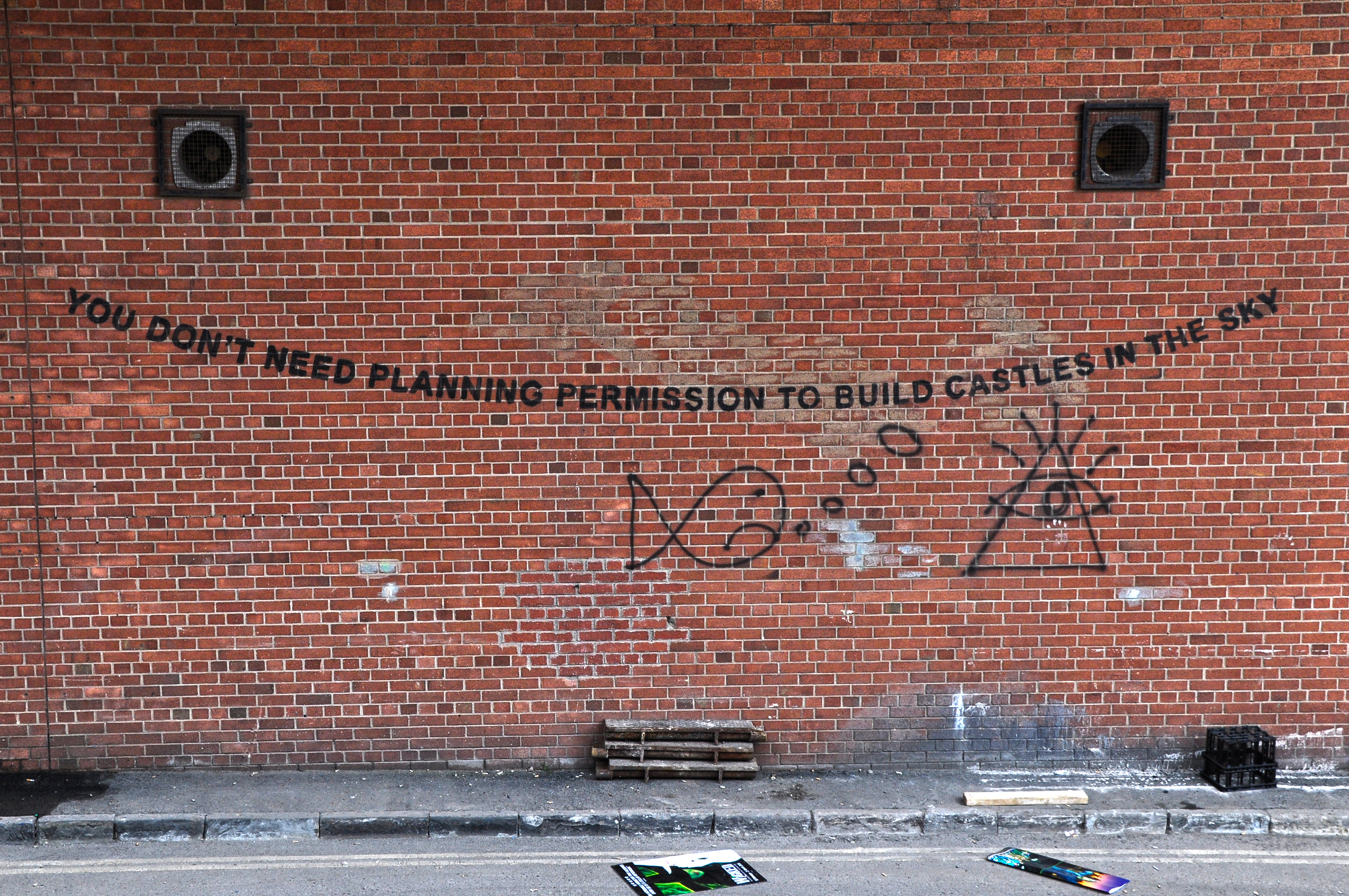
Wall graffiti in the Bristol city centre. United Kingdom. 2015

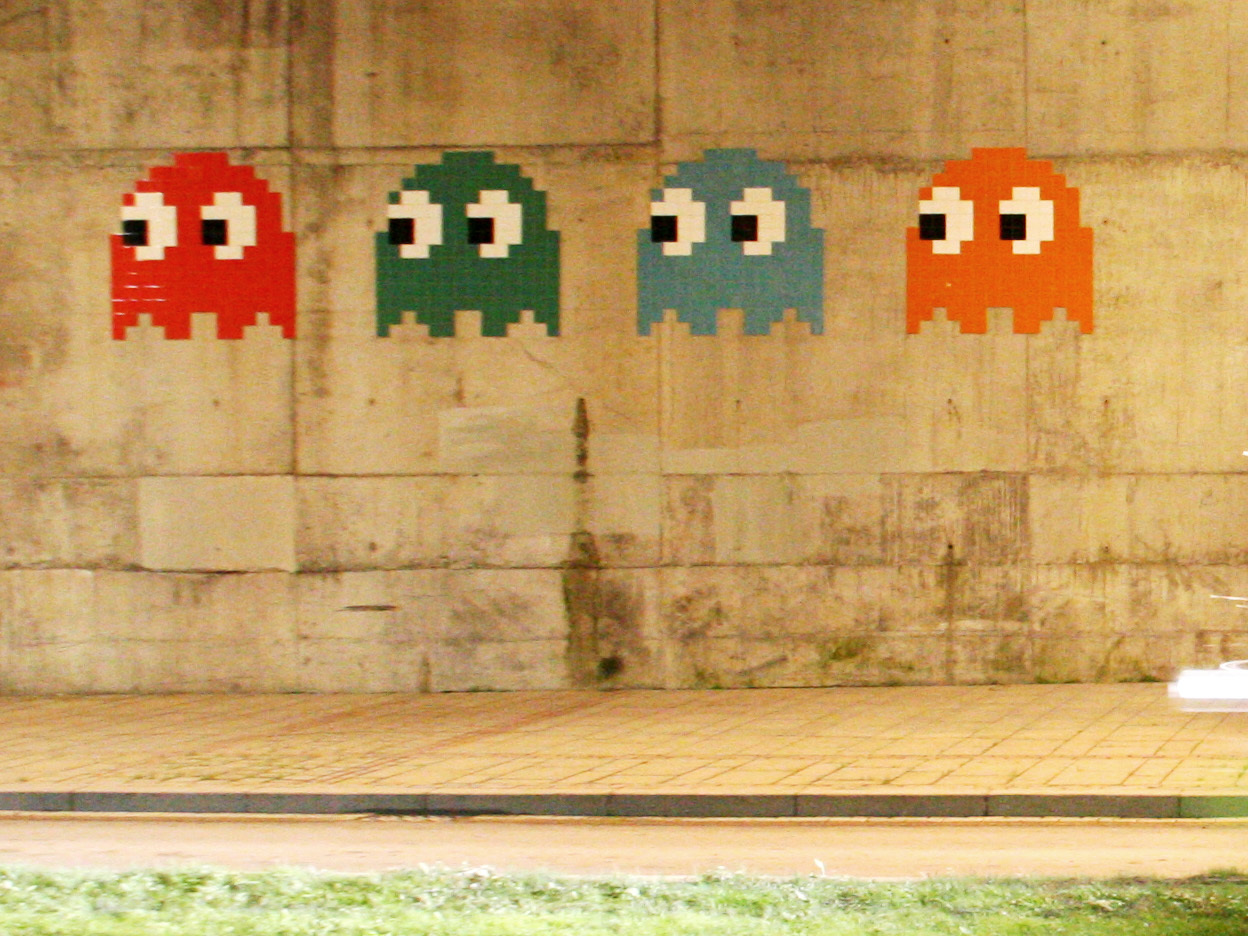
The ghosts from the computer game Pac-Man. A mosaic by Invader in Bilbao, Spain.

== See also ==
- Anti-graffiti coating
- Mural
- Stencil graffiti
- Street art
- Yarn bombing
- Caning of Michael Fay
