= 10 Foot =

London-based graffiti writer

10 Foot DDS
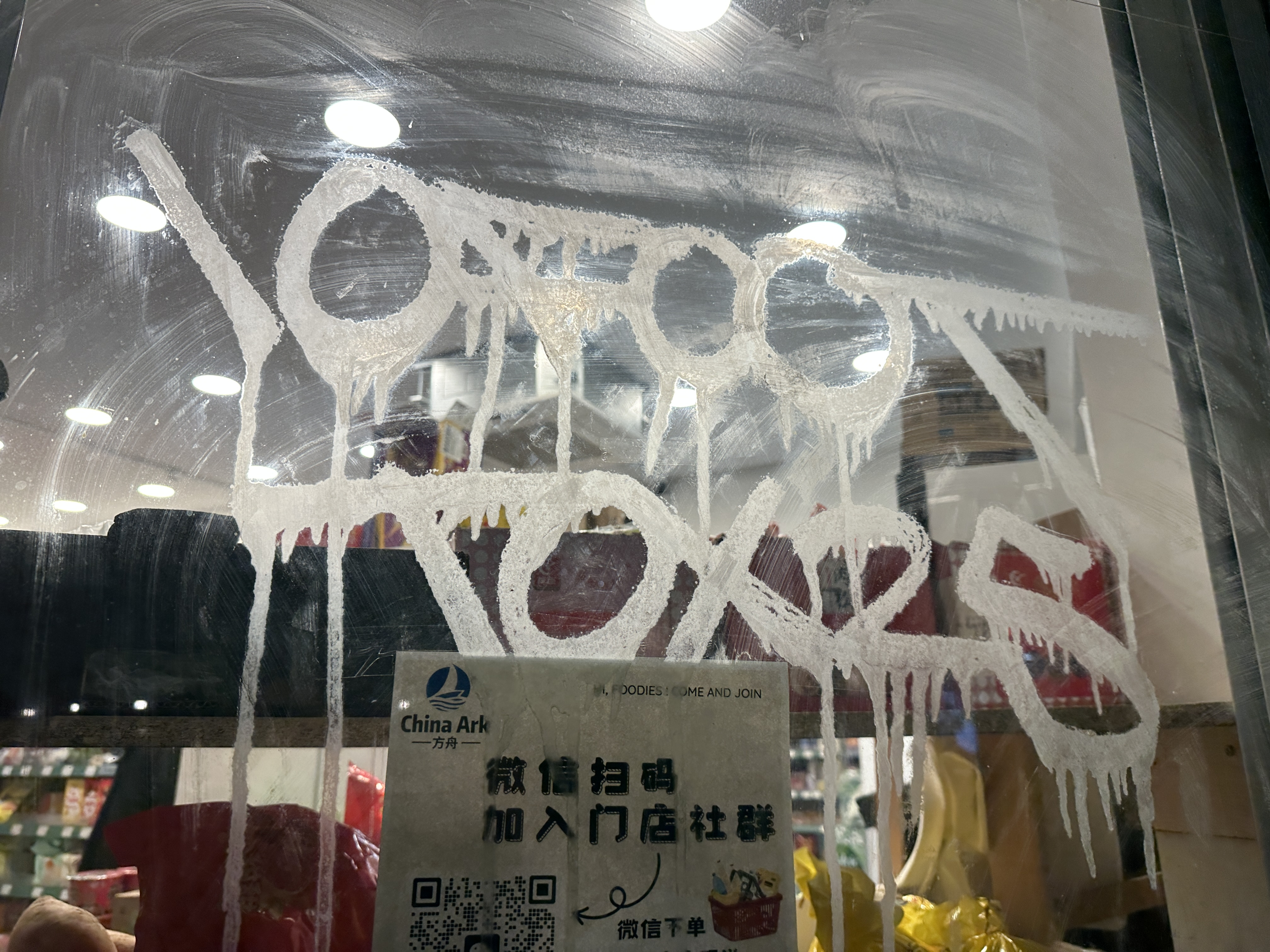
- A 10 Foot and Tox25 glass etching
- Style: Tagging
- Movement: Graffiti
- Website: 10foot10foot10foot10foot on Instagram

10 Foot is the tag of a pseudonymous London-based graffiti writer. He has been described by the Financial Times as the city's most prolific, and one of the most productive globally.

== Career ==
10 Foot began writing graffiti at the age of 12. On 18 November 2010, 10 Foot was convicted of being guilty of 25 counts of criminal damage totalling up to an estimated £113,000. He was subsequently jailed for 24 months, and handed a 5-year ASBO.

Many 10 Foot tags notably appear in central London, alongside famous landmarks. 10 Foot is known for tagging locations which are difficult to access. Despite his notoriety in London, his work is also known to be in 53 cities worldwide.

10 Foot guest edited the 17 March 2025 issue of The Big Issue. In June 2026 he created his first sculpture, entitled Faerie Newbuild, which was exhibited at the Museum of Homelessness.
