= Woodblock =

Woodblock or wood block may refer to:

- Woodblock (instrument), a percussion musical instrument
- Woodblock printing, a method of printing in which an image is carved into the surface of a piece of wood
- Woodblock graffiti
- Toy block, a type of construction toy often made out of wood
