= Jason Wulf =

American graffiti artist

DG MSD NWC
- Born: Jason Wulf; 1971 or 1972
- Died: July 2, 2014 (aged 42); 25th Street station, Sunset Park
- Movement: Graffiti

Jason Wulf (known by the tag DG or DGOne) was a Queens based graffiti artist. He worked as a carpenter and sign painter.

== Life ==
Wulf started doing graffiti in 1985, making images of cartoons as well as tagging. Later in his career, he began selling commercial graffiti through art galleries. He was the founder of a graffiti crew known as "New Wave Crew" and a member of "Mad Subway Demons". Wulf continued to graffiti during the MTA's Clean Train Movement era, when tagged cars were constantly being removed from service, and he was arrested 13 times.

== Death ==
Wulf died in 2014, while crossing the tracks at the 25th subway station in Sunset Park. To commemorate him, graffiti artists tagged walls and made murals across New York.

== See also ==
- List of graffiti and street-art injuries and deaths
- Graffiti in New York City
