= Smear (graffiti artist) =

American graffiti artist

Smear MTA
- A Smear sticker in Los Angeles, 2006
- Born: Cristian Gheorghiu; Socialist Republic of Romania
- Notable work: Liquor Face
- Movement: Street art

Cristian Gheorghiu is a Romanian-born American street artist/graffiti artist who has worked under the name of Smear in the 2000s. He's been referred to as "a subculture sensation" and his work has appeared in contemporary art galleries, and a solo museum exhibit in 2009. He was also a defendant in a civil lawsuit filed by the L.A. City attorney's office, a lawsuit which largely because of its First Amendment implications has garnered the attention of international media, including the Huffington Post, L.A. Weekly, the Los Angeles Times, and the Associated Press.

== L.A. graffiti scene ==
Smear has been influential in the Los Angeles graffiti scene since the late 1990s. He was one of the first Los Angeles street artists to use street art methods in his graffiti. Before Smear, street art and graffiti art were considered separate communities. Graffiti practitioners at the time in the L.A. scene rarely ventured into the forms popularized by Smear. As a graffiti artist, Smear was further distinguished from the others by his uncomplicated graffiti writing style, unlike the intricate wildstyle works which are commonly a part of graffiti art. Smear's uncomplicated style used a spontaneous repertoire of images, designs and slogans. Among Smear's most famous street art images are his "Liquor Face" character (which momentarily appears in DreamWorks Pictures' animated film Bee Movie), and another image which is a shadowy depiction of Smear's own face, with "Smear" written underneath.

Marc Ecko's Complex Magazine put Smear at number 14 on their list of "The 50 Biggest Street Art Arrests" of all time.

In 2006 he began exhibiting/displaying in Los Angeles galleries some of the original art works that he had created, which were in the form of paintings (on canvas and on woodpanels) and drawings, including collage and other media.

== Legal issues ==
In February 2007, Cristian Gheorghiu "Smear" was arrested for alleged graffiti on LACMTA buses. A graffiti vandalism conviction resulted in a 40-month suspended prison sentence, three years' probation, and about $28,000 in restitution for tagging on buses. In February 2009 Gheorghiu was arrested again mistakenly in a sweep aimed at a tagging crew that calls themselves the Metro Transit Assassins (MTA), a crew Smear was suspected of having once been a part of. Members of that MTA crew were accused of perpetrating a quarter-mile long graffiti which is claimed by many to have been the largest single work of graffiti in the world. Following that 2009 sweep, Gheorghiu/Smear spent about a week in jail, but charges against him were never filed.

In June 2010, the L.A. city attorney filed a civil lawsuit against 11 alleged members or alleged former members of the MTA crew, Gheorghiu being named in that lawsuit as one of the alleged members or former members of the crew. The suit had asked for $5,000,000 in restitution from the 11 defendants and was seeking a first-of-its-kind injunction against a graffiti crew, an injunction modeled on those made for violent street gangs. One of the provisions sought would prevent Gheorghiu from using his graffiti name "Smear" in his art work. "It raises extreme 1st Amendment issues, " said Peter Bibring, an attorney with the American Civil Liberties Union of Southern California, who is representing Gheorghiu. "The government shouldn't be in a position of saying you can't make art from certain materials".

On March 16, 2011, the Los Angeles Times published a column one front page profile on Cristian Gheorghiu/Smear chronicling his rise from scrawling his name on the streets of the city to being an art world habituée. That same evening after that paper hit the stands, Gheorghiu's home was raided but Gheorghiu was not at home; he was arrested the following day when he turned himself in. He was arrested for alleged probation violation. Gheorghiu's attorney, Peter Bibring of the ACLU, said L.A. deputies told him they planned to show that Gheorghiu possessed "graffiti tools" in his home, and that that was "a violation of his probation" and "merited new charges". On March 24, 2011, Los Angeles County Superior Court judge Marcelita Haynes sentenced Gheorghiu to 13 days in jail and 45 days of community service, adding that his success as a tagger-turned-artist could help inspire young graffiti writers to take their art into the studios.

On June 20, 2012, the civil case against 11 alleged members of the MTA crew named in the suit was settled with the 11 defendants no longer required to pay the city of Los Angeles millions of dollars for graffiti cleanup. The city agreed not to enforce the injunction against 8 of the defendants (Gheorghiu being one of those 8 defendants) as long as they refrain from any "graffiti vandalism" and complete certain requirements. Furthermore, the cases would be totally dismissed when the defendants pay outstanding fines, perform 100 hours of graffiti removal and five years pass without a graffiti conviction. Since Gheorghiu had paid all outstanding fines and 5 years since 2007 had passed without a graffiti conviction and he had finished the 100 hours of community service, the case against Cristian Gheorghiu was dismissed June 20, 2012.

== Contemporary artist ==
A 2012 painting by Cristian Gheorghiu, titled "Golden Age"

In 2006 Cristian Gheorghiu/Smear began exhibiting his mixed media art works, which have been described by the L.A. Times as "unique renderings of human forms with vivid colors and rough, emotional strokes". The Times article details that Smear's art developed a following, especially among a subculture of street art aficionados. By 2009 he had several solo gallery shows and numerous group exhibitions, and was also featured in a solo exhibit, Immigration to Integration at the Ventura County Museum of Art and History.

In April 2011, the Museum of Contemporary Art Los Angeles (MOCA) debuted the groundbreaking Art in the Streets exhibit at the Geffen Contemporary Art Museum in the Little Tokyo area of Los Angeles. After the opening, following complaints from local authorities of an increase in graffiti around the area of the Geffen Contemporary in Little Tokyo, the L.A. Times interviewed Smear once again: when asked about the exhibit, Gheorghiu said, "The 'Art in the Streets' exhibit or an exhibit like it had to come about around this time period, it would be a cultural crime if it hadn't". In media coverage about the 'Art in the Streets' exhibit, which is scheduled to show in Brooklyn, New York after its Los Angeles run, Smear has often been named and mentioned, so far as to be mentioned mistakenly as one of the featured artists in the exhibit by an Associated Press article from May 1, 2011.

Cristian Gheorghiu was the first artist to ever be showcased at the German government's Goethe Institute in Los Angeles, an exhibit that was on display from February 25, 2012, to March 10, 2012. In autumn of 2012, Gheorghiu had an exhibit at the Azusa Pacific University.

== See also ==
- Metro Transit Assassins
