= Caine 1 =

American graffiti artist

- Caine 1 during an appearance on WNBC's Today in New York hosted by Ponchitta Pierce, 1982
- Born: Edward Glowaski; 1958
- Died: March 14, 1982 (aged 24); Corona, Queens, New York
- Known for: King of the 7 line; First ever whole train
- Notable work: Dick Tracy car (mid-70's); The Freedom Train (1976); Welcome to Hell (1976)
- Movement: Graffiti
- Memorials: Caine 1 Free for Eternity (1982); Welcome to Heaven (1982); Welcome to Hell Memorial Car (1982)

Edward Glowaski, known as Caine 1, was an American graffiti artist from Woodside, Queens, New York. He was considered king of the 7 line and was known for painting the first whole train in graffiti history.

== Biography ==
Glowaski began painting graffiti in 1973 and became known for producing complex themed whole cars that incorporated characters. He came up with the tag 'Caine' by corrupting the surname of the movie character Charles Foster Kane. Amongst his most famous train paintings were his Dick Tracy car, Spellbound, and the Welcome to Hell car, which was reputed to have run for a number of years without being painted over by other graffiti artists out of respect. By 1976 Caine 1 was considered king of the 7 line by other New York graffiti artists. Although most of his paintings were executed solo, Caine 1 was a member of The Knight Hawks graffiti crew.

In 1976 Glowaski planned and executed, what was regarded as, the first whole train in graffiti history. The painting was named The Freedom Train and was completed to coincide with the United States Bicentennial. Prior to its accomplishment by Caine 1 the whole train, as a concept, was considered to be the apex of what could be achieved by a graffiti writer. Following the subsequent destruction of the artwork by the New York City Transit Authority Caine 1’s whole car gained legendary status as part of the history of New York graffiti.

On 17 November 1977 Glowaski was arrested, alongside three other teenagers, after allegedly grave robbing from two separate cemeteries in Queens, New York. It was believed that the grave robbings had taken place in order to supply human remains to a satanic cult. Skulls were reportedly removed from corpses entombed in the Calvary Cemetery and St. Michael’s Cemetery in order to be sold for $500 each. The four defendants were later charged with possession of stolen property, trespass, and body-stealing. Whilst awaiting trial Glowaski was held under observation at the Kings County Hospital where he became acquainted with and befriended the serial killer David Berkowitz.

In 1978 Caine 1 started to produce graffiti decorated jackets which he termed ‘whole jackets’. Along with fellow graffiti artist PC Kid, Glowaski created a series of ‘Astoria Rocks’ denim jackets that were inspired by the bikers who frequented the Astoria neighbourhood of New York. He also collaborated with the artist Lady Pink in painting backpieces for commissioned jackets.

In 1982 Glowaski had his work exhibited beside Freedom, Iz the Wiz and Lady Pink, among others, at the Graffiti Above Ground gallery in Greenwich Village.

=== Death ===
On the 15 March 1982 The New York Times reported that a 24 year old Glowaski had been shot during an attempted burglary and subsequently died in Elmhurst Hospital. The report also named the murdered man as the artist Caine 1, noting that he had recently had his artwork displayed at the Graffiti Above Ground gallery.

The reported version of events that led to Glowaski's death has since been challenged by acquaintances of the artist who claim that, rather than committing a burglary, he was in fact trying to escape an attempted robbery outside a bar. In a 2014 interview Lady Pink stated that prior to his death Glowaski had received death threats from gangs and a satanic cult he had previously been involved in.

== Legacy ==
Following Glowaski’s death various memorials were created in honour of Caine 1 such as the Welcome to Hell Memorial Car by the artist Joey. In 1982 the New York graffiti writer Midg produced the Caine 1 Free for Eternity top-to-bottom whole car, an image of which was later used as an epitaph in the book Subway Art. In 2010 the memorial was reimagined using a Shakespearean quote and painted as a mural as part of the Subway Art History Project.

An essay written by Caine 1 was used as the preface to Jack Stewart's original study titled Mass Transit Art Subway Graffiti. In it, Glowaski outlined a history of New York graffiti beginning with Kilroy Was Here and Taki 183, ending with graffiti's apparent death in 1974. He argued that the crack-down on graffiti adversely affected the aspirations of the working-class graffiti artists.

Various graffiti artists have noted Caine 1 as an influence on their work, including LEE, PC Kid and Gear 1. In 1981 Caine 1 painted a jacket for the photojournalist Martha Cooper which she has since displayed at numerous events. Another jacket that he painted for Lady Pink has been exhibited at various museums including the Phoenix Art Museum.

In 2013 Complex magazine named Caine 1 as number 13 in a list of the 50 greatest New York City graffiti artists. Glowaski’s work was included in the City as Canvas exhibition at the Museum of the City of New York in 2014.

Caine 1 appears as a fictional character inhabiting the land of the dead in the monograph What Do One Million Ja Tags Signify?
