= Glossary of graffiti =

A number of words and phrases that have come to describe different styles and aspects of graffiti and its subculture. Like other jargon and colloquialisms, some of these terms may vary regionally, taking on different meanings across different cities and countries. The following terminology originates primarily in the United States.

== A–D ==
angels
Famous or respected graffitist who has died. The people who admire them tag their names on a wall with halos above them or make tribute pieces with their faces or tag with the dates of their birth to death.

anti style
A form of graffiti that deliberately flouts graffiti norms; also called ignorant style or hipster style.

all city
To mark surfaces with graffiti throughout the entirety of a given city, usually with aerosol paint, and to be widely recognized for these efforts.

autorack
Type of freight rail car that is tall, long, low, and flat.

back-to-back
Graffiti that covers a wall from end-to-end, as seen on some parts of the West-Berlin side of the Berlin Wall. Similarly, trains sometimes receive end-to-end painting when a carriage has been painted along its entire length. This is often abbreviated as e2e. End-to-ends used to be called window-downs but this is an older expression that is falling from popularity.

backjump
A quickly executed throw up or panel piece. Backjumps are usually painted on a train or a bus that is temporarily stationary. Backjumps at a train station occur when a train arrives at a station and then while it is temporarily stopped for passengers a tagger then moves over to the train and attempts to tag the side of it before it moves away again. This can be very dangerous as it involves being around moving trains on train lines and collisions with trains have occurred where people have died. The word "backjump" refers to people jumping off the train once it is stationary at a train station and then returning to the same train to create graffiti. Also in Russia and some European countries writers practice "surf jumps" or simply "surfing" - especially quick backjump pieces, executed in less than 1-2 minutes during train stops. Usually writers hide near the track and, as the train rolls up to the station, start to tag the side opposite to the platform, utilizing Ultra-Wide or Booster cans with especially high paint output. The word "surfing" was first used by writers, who pioneered this style in Russia.

bencher
An individual who takes photographs of graffiti. The term originated in New York when graffiti writers and non-graffiti writers would sit on benches at train stations waiting for the trains to go by to take pictures and admire graffiti.

black book
A graffiti artist's sketchbook, which is also known as a "piece book." Black books are often used to sketch out and plan potential graffiti, and to collect tags from other writers. These are a writer's most valuable property since they contain all or a majority of the person's sketches and pieces. A writer's sketchbook is carefully guarded against the police and other authorities, as it can be used as material evidence in a graffiti vandalism case and link a writer to previous illicit works.

blockbuster
A large graffiti with simple, legible letters. Often painted by a brush or a roller.

bite
To steal another graffitist's ideas, name, lettering or color schemes. Seasoned graffitists will often complain about toys that bite their work.

bomb
To bomb or hit is to paint many surfaces in an area. Bombers often choose to paint throw-ups or tags instead of complex pieces, as they can be executed more quickly.

bulls
Security patrolling an area on the lookout for any on-the-whim individuals.

buff
To remove painted graffiti with chemicals and other instruments, or to paint over it with a flat color.

burn
To beat a competitor with a style. To rat out an accomplice or crime partner either intentionally or unintentionally.

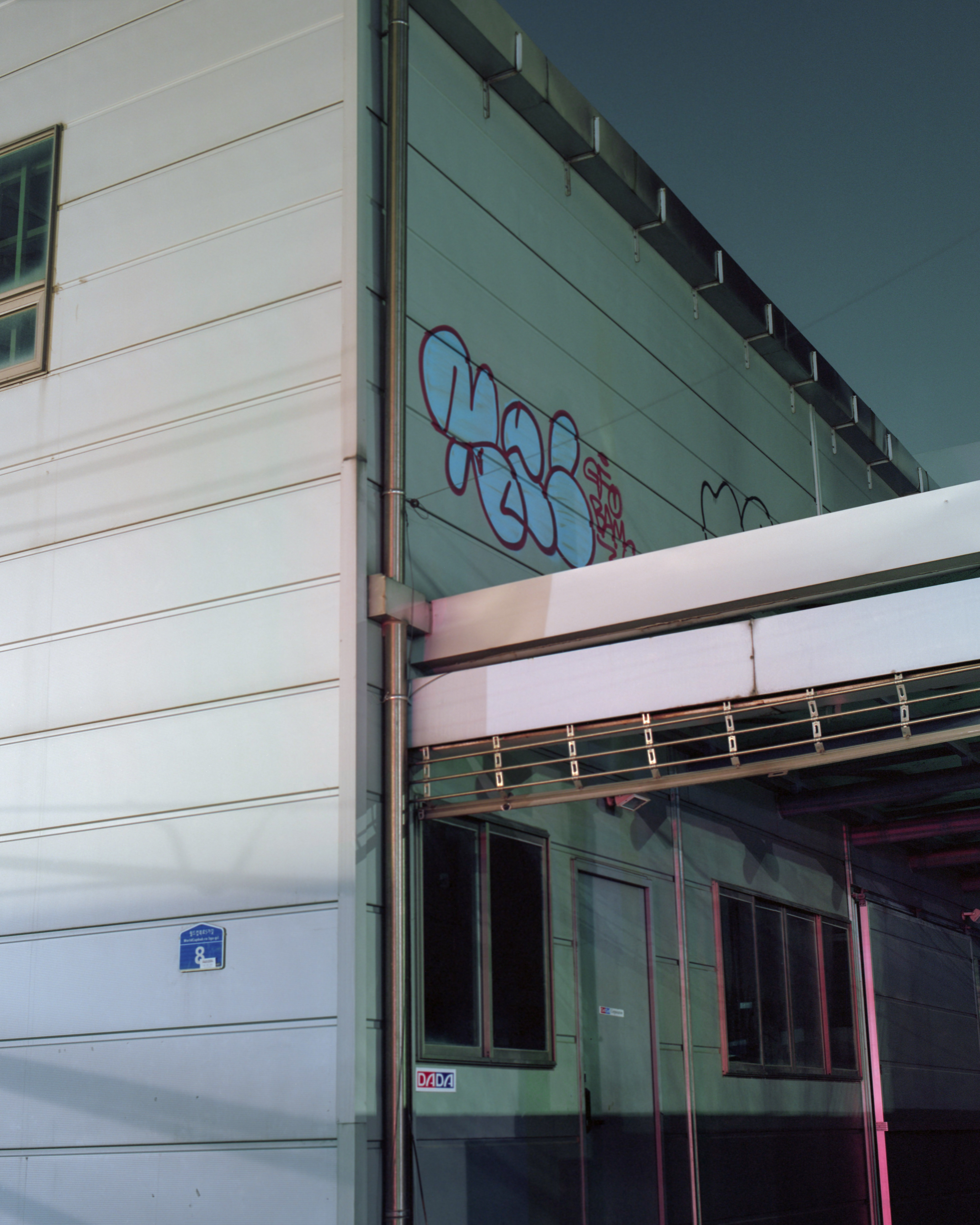
Illegal pieces usually painted in places that are hard to control

burner
1. A large, more elaborate type of piece. The piece could be said to be "burning" out of the wall, billboard, or train-side. Because they take so much time and effort, burners in downtown areas are more likely to be legal pieces, painted with the consent of the property owner. The early writers of New York City also did burners illegally on trains, and adventurous modern writers sometimes still do large-scale illegal pieces in heavily trafficked areas.
2. Originally a well-done wildstyle window-down whole car, a burner is a very good piece with bright colors and good style. Obviously, the reference to a window-down car is not applicable for pieces that are not on trains.

burning
Any work having not been removed. "That piece is still burning on main street."

cannon(s)
A slang term for spray paint cans. This term is thought to originate in Brooklyn, New York.

cap
1. The nozzle for the aerosol paint can, also referred to as "tips." Different kinds are used for different styles. New York Thins, Rustos, and New York Fats are the most commonly used caps.
2. To slash or in any other way ruin a piece made by others. Derives from a writer named "Cap" who was infamous for making throw-ups over others' pieces.

clown or ass-clown, goof or goof ball
Any writer who is extremely careless to get himself caught and arrested, especially with observant citizens and even the police watching the writer in the act.

character
In the context of graffiti, individual writers may have unique characters they draw which work in the same way as their moniker.

crew

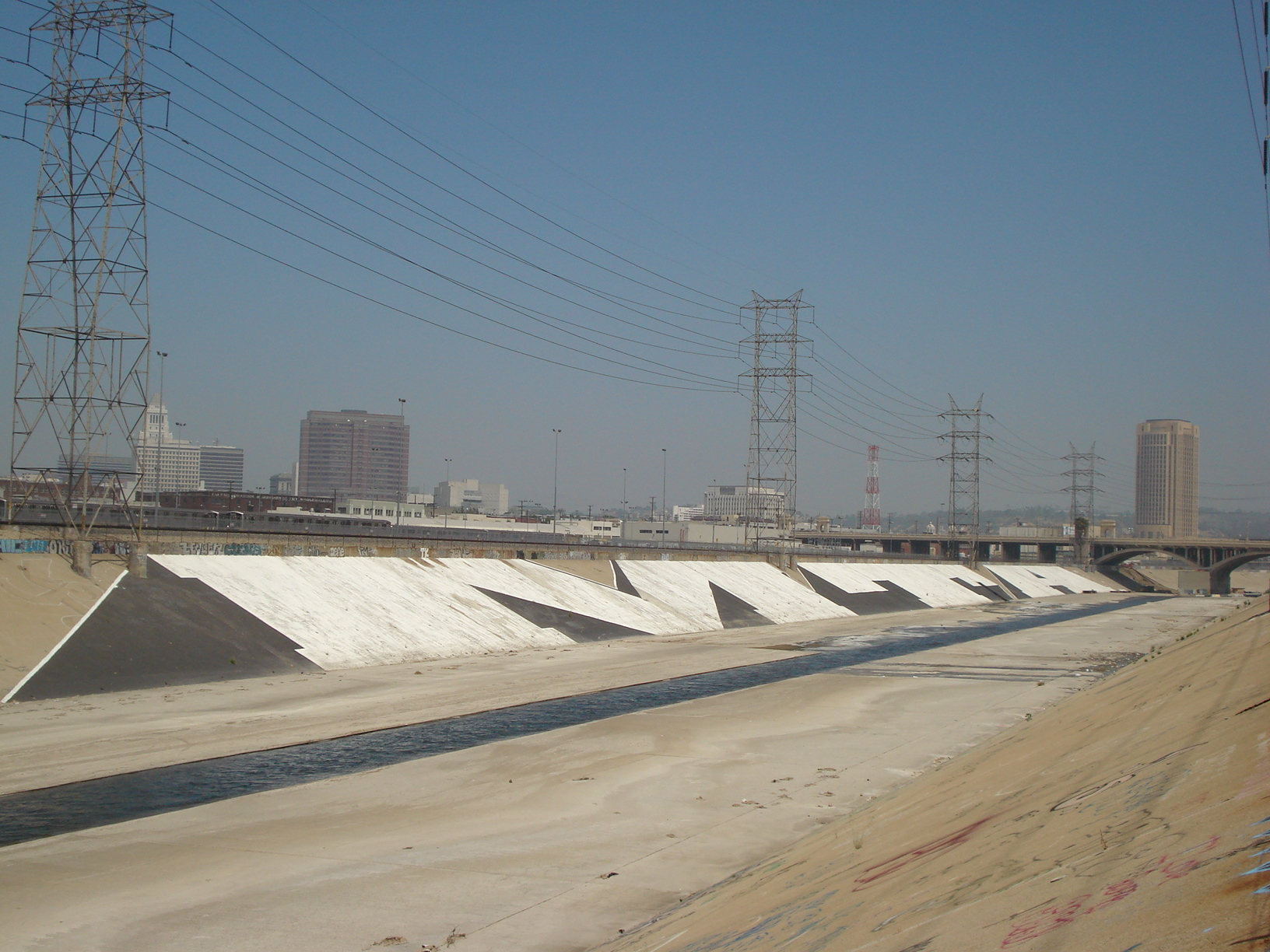
The MTA crew blockbuster in the Los Angeles River

A crew, krew, or cru is a group of associated graffitists that often work together. Crews are differentiated from gangs in that their main objective is to paint graffiti, although gang-like activity may occur. Matthew O'Deane (formerly of San Diego District Attorney Investigators Foundation) described in 2016, taggers have become more violent and gang-like than in the earlier times. Any group of friends can quickly and informally form a crew if they are interested in graffiti and want to start conspiring. Often crews will recruit new members over time in order to maintain their relevance. There is a smaller risk of being held responsible for crew works if a single member gets arrested. From a legal point of view, the name could have been painted by anyone in the group.
Tagging crew names are usually three letters, but can be two to five letters long. The letters are abbreviations of the full crew name. Numbers in crew name can be derived from many things such as the alphabet sequence (1=A, 2=B, 3= C....), telephone keypad numbers (2=A, B, or C; 3=D, E or F), area codes, or penal codes or a combination of these.

Dog
UK term for going over or dissing someone's tag or piece.

Domming
A color-mixing technique done by spraying one color over another while it is still wet, then rubbing the two together. Sometimes an abrasive like sand is used to create different effects. The term is derived from "condom," as a reference to its synonym rubber and is sometimes called fingering, as it is commonly done with one's fingers.

Dropsy
A bribe.

dress-up
To completely write all over a specific area like a door-way, wall or window that is untouched.

dubs
London/UK style of graffiti executed in silver or chrome paint. Usually, on railway walls or street locations, it is done quickly by a crew or group of writers.

== E–K ==
end-to-end (...)
The opposite of top-to-bottom – meaning a train-car covered with paint from one side of it to the other. Used as an adjective and non-commonly as a noun.

etch

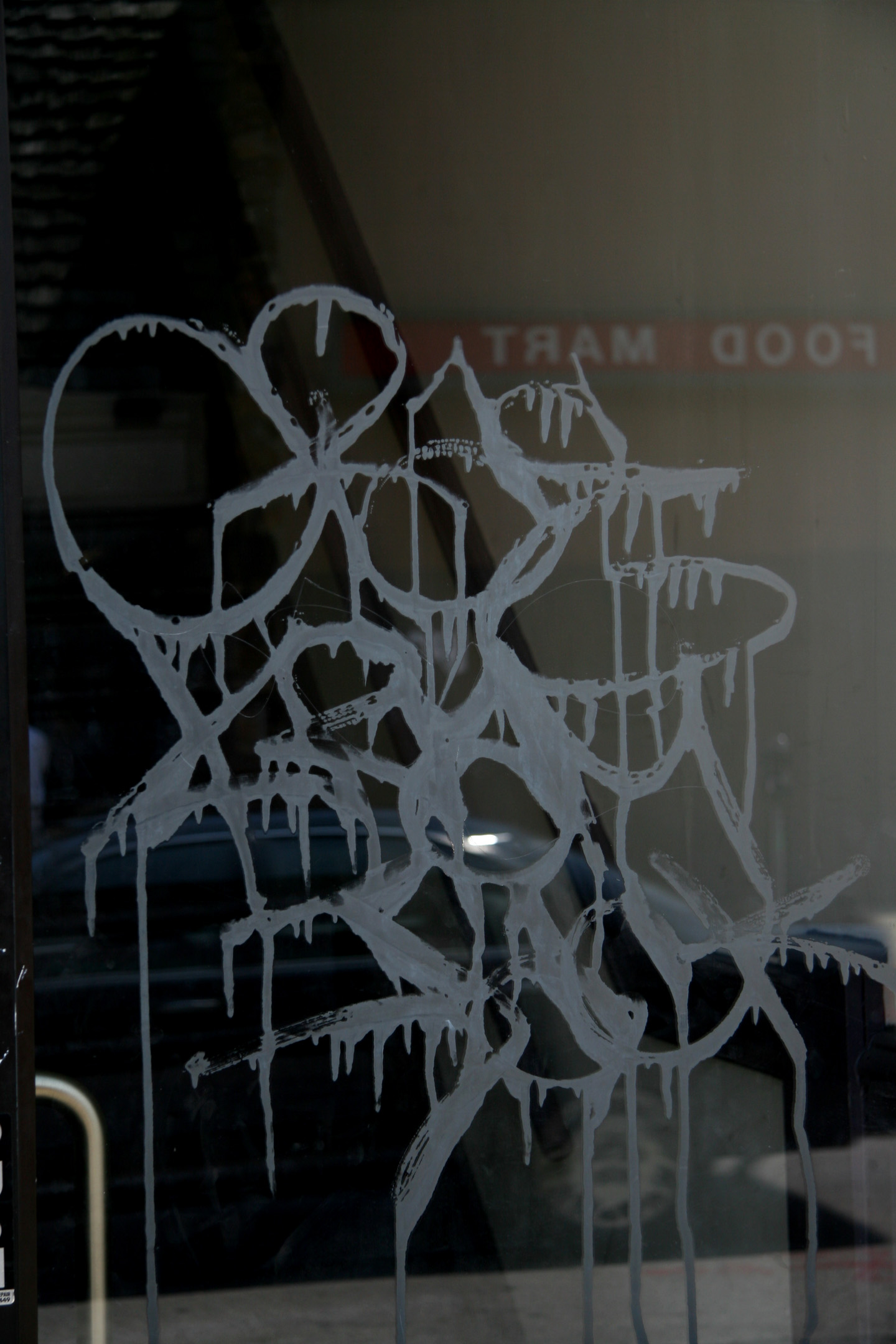
Etching-Tags in Chicago

The use of acid solutions intended for creating frosted glass, such as Etch Bath, to write on windows. In Norway, some trains have even been taken temporarily out of service because of the acid tagging, which is potentially dangerous for other people's health.

fat cap
A nozzle used for wide coverage; while practical for quickly applying fill colors, most are also useful for thick outlines as well as lettering. When used for lettering, most fat caps can produce a characteristic flare by increasing the distance between the can and the canvas mid-spray.

fills or fill ins
A piece of graffiti that is either filled in a rush or a solid fill, also referred to as bombs, throw ups, or throwies. A fill is also the interior base color of the piece of graffiti.

fire extinguisher
A fire extinguisher that has been filled with diluted paint (typically of the latex variety) for the purpose of utilizing the pressurized paint to quickly produce large tags. Due to decreased control one has over the application of paint when using this method, it tends to result in a sloppier, far less polished look. While tags are the most common use for this technique, throwups are not unheard of.

gallery, also yard
Locations such as overpasses and walls facing train tracks that are secluded from the general public but are popular with writers. Since anything that is written is likely to stay for a while, an accumulation of styles and skills can be viewed.

genocidal
Any municipality that has zero tolerance for vigilante street art or unapproved written messages and will not hesitate to buff anything detected.

German Montana
A specialty brand of paint marketed for graffiti. Not to be confused with the older Spanish brand, Montana Colors.

getting up
To develop your reputation or "rep" through writing graffiti. (see King).

ghost
The mark left after paint or ink has been unsuccessfully buffed.

going over
To "go over" a piece of graffiti simply means to paint on top of it. While most writers respect one another's artwork, to intentionally and disrespectfully paint on top of another's work is akin to a graffiti declaration of war. However (due partially to the limited amount of desirable wall-space) most graffiti writers maintain a hierarchy of sorts; a tag can legitimately be covered by a throw-up, and a throw-up by a piece, and this is commonly done without incident. If a piece has previously been slashed (or "dissed"), it is also acceptable for another writer to go over it. To violate these guidelines, or to simply paint lower-quality graffiti on top of a higher-quality work will quickly characterize a writer as an annoyance, or "toy." This is dangerous as most crews and writers will react with physical violence or by repeatedly going over writers not respecting their self-claimed rank in the hierarchy.

graf
A small graffiti work, usually a drawing rather than words or numbers.

hat (honor-among-thieves)
A person who is described as wearing a "hat" is a graffitist who is considered trustworthy in the graffiti community. A person who knows a lot of information about other graffitists but does not spread such knowledge to the authorities. "Don't worry about him, he wears a dope hat."

head
1 Similar to a king or queen, a "head" is a writer who has much skill and a high reputation among other writers in his area.
2 Also "O.G. Head" (for Original, or Original Gangsta).

heaven spots
Spots that are challenging to graffiti but in highly visible locations with heavy exposure. Billboards, freeway signs, and tall bridges are potential examples, but the object itself does not determine whether or not it offers a heaven spot, as factors such as the amount of civilian and law enforcement traffic that passes within view of the target as well as the physical dangers inherent to reaching the spot in question generally must be present to qualify. A billboard in the middle of rural region poses little challenge even to many novice graffitists, while one in a busy part of a major city requires careful premeditation to pull off successfully. Graffitists pursue these spots for the increased exposure and notoriety they provide. This term also encompasses a double-meaning as the locations are often very dangerous to paint there and it may lead to death, thus, going to heaven (also known as "hitting up the heavens").

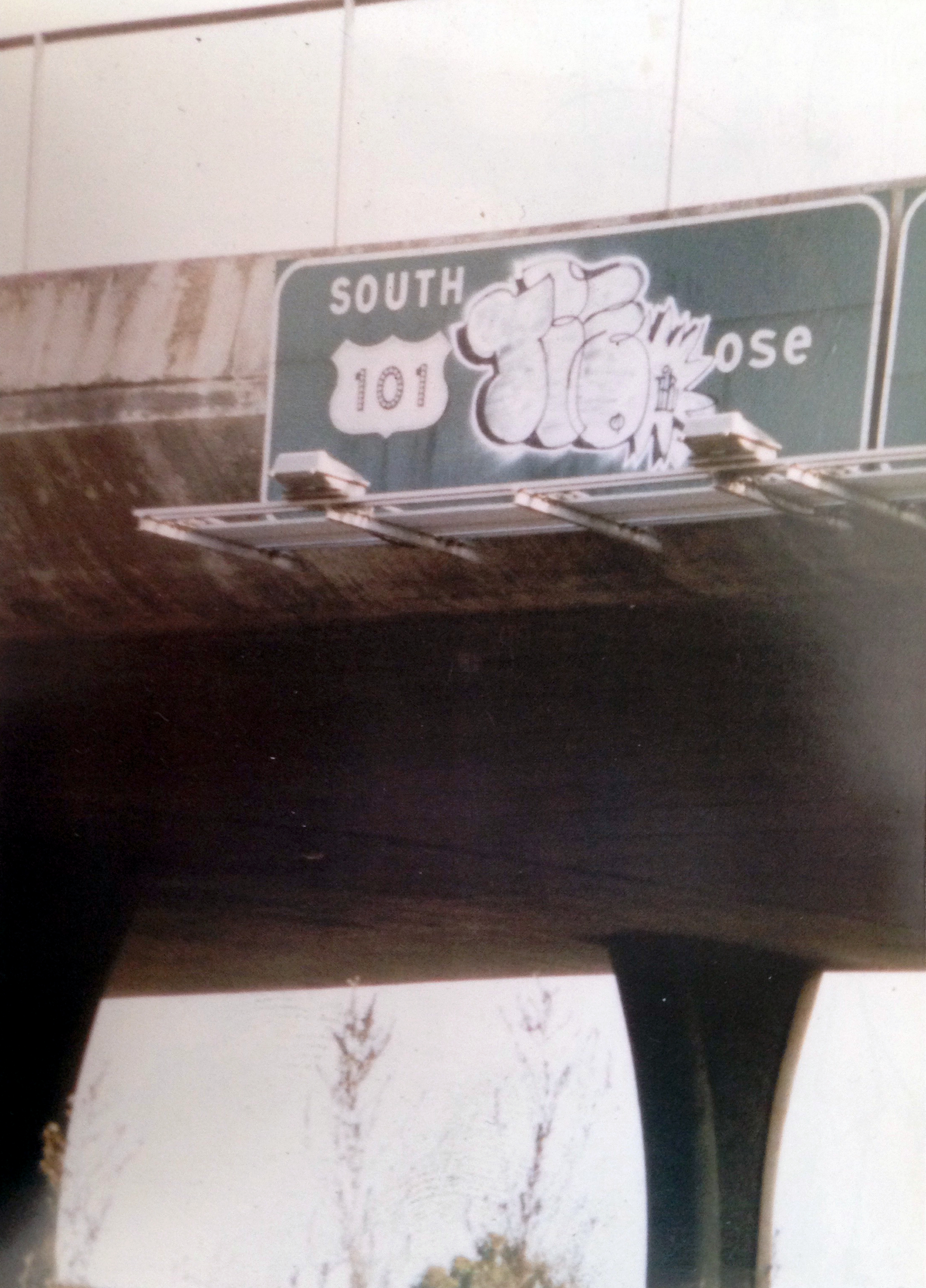
Highway sign graffiti, or a 'Heaven' in San Francisco, c. 1997

hollows
Also referred to as "outlines" and "shells." A hollow is a throwup that consists only of an outline (and perhaps a shadow effect) with no fill.

insides
Graffiti done inside trains, trams, or buses. In 1970s New York, there was as much graffiti inside the subway trains as outside, and the same is true of some cities today (like Rome, Italy and Melbourne, Australia). While still very common, insides are often perceived as being less artistic.

king
Graffitists of the highest accomplishments. Kings or queens (feminine) are writers especially respected among other writers. This is sometimes separated into "inside" and "outside" kings. To be a king of the inside means you have most tags inside trains (to "own the inside"), and to "own the outside" means having most pieces on the train surface. There are kings of style among a variety of other categories and the term is regionally subjective. For example, in Los Angeles, a King would be someone who has achieved that status for years-long runs in their graffiti, style, ups, and originality. Self-declared kings will often incorporate crowns into their pieces; a commonly used element of style. However, the people must be very self-confident when doing it, since other great writers tend to slash out self-proclaimed kings who have not gained that rank yet in their eyes. Typically a writer can only become a king if another king with that status already has expressed so.

Krylon
A paint brand that was one of the most popular with writers, it is thought of virtually synonymous with graffiti, due to general quality and availability. Heavily used during the heyday of the New York City Subway graffiti era during the early 1970s to late 1980s, it has a nostalgic status. Starting in mid-2008, the brand introduced a generation of paint can design with an irremovable cap system that sprays a rectangular coverage instead of the circular coverage preferred by writers. The paint quality is runnier and translucent in comparison to graffiti specialty brands. Sherwin Williams, Krylon's parent company, has dominated a significant portion of the paint market and many retail outlets stock only Krylon paints. For this reason, Krylon is categorized into three groups.

- 360 Krylon – from the "Ez touch 360 dial control" label
- triple Krylon – from the "No Runs, No Drips, No Errors" label
- original Krylon – The first line of cans, sought after as a collector's item

It is considered to be an indication of being a toy if one chooses 360 Krylon.

== L–P ==
landmark
When an individual or crew tags on a certain location that becomes very difficult for removal, or is obscure and hidden from the buff. This will usually be demarcated with a signature that documents the time that they were written. Graffiti that is considered a "landmark" has usually been in place for at least 5 years. These spots are highly respected by other writers, and to go over them can warrant disfavor.

legal
A graffiti piece or production that is made with permission.

lock on
Sculptural street art in a public space, chained or locked to public furniture. The lock on style is a "non-destructive" form of underground art.

married couple
Two simultaneous whole cars painted next to each other. Some graffitists make fun of the term by connecting the two paintings across the car-gap often in a humorous or obvious way to signal the marriage. (Subway cars permanently coupled and sharing a single air-compressor and electrical generator between them are technically married pairs.)

massacre
When municipal authorities take down or cover up an accumulation of tags and pieces, leaving a blank space.

mop
A type of homemade graffiti marker used for larger tags that often has a round nib and leaves a fat, drippy line. Mops may be filled with various inks or paints.

mural
See, piece.

one-liner
A tag, throwie, or bomb written in one constant motion. These may be done with any writing utensil. The tip or nozzle of the writing implement does not lift from the canvas until the tag is complete.

paint-eater
An unprimed surface such as raw wood or concrete that eats up standard spray paint. If a location has been given the reputation of being a "paint eater", then in such cases a thicker paint should be used. Additionally, writers can use house paint to prime the surface before painting.

painters touch
A brand by Rust-Oleum that is favored for quality and general availability.

paste-up
A drawing, stencil, etc. on paper fixed to a wall or other surface using wheatpaste or wallpaper paste.

patch
A tag that has been buffed by being painted over usually by gray paint or "patched" over.

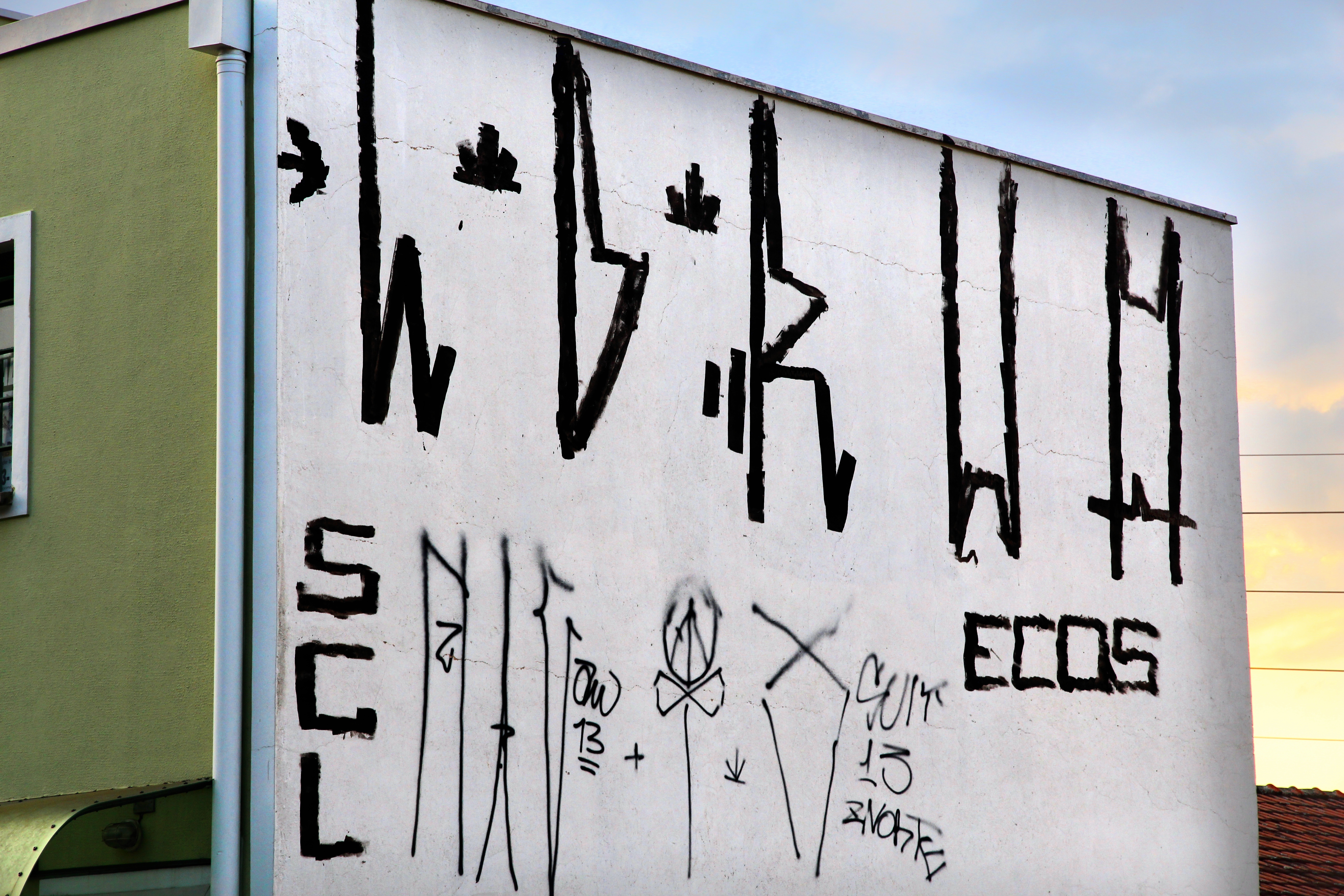
Pichação in Curitiba, Brazil

pichação
A unique, Brazilian form of tagging found in that country characterized by its distinct, cryptic style.

piece (short form of masterpiece)
A large, complex, and labor-intensive graffiti painting. Pieces often incorporate 3-D effects, arrows, and many colors and color-transitions, as well as various other effects. These will usually be done by writers with more experience. Originally shorthand for masterpiece, considered the full and most beautiful work of graffiti. A piece requires more time to paint than a throw-up. If placed in a difficult location and well-executed it will earn the writer more respect. Piece can also be used as a verb that means: "to write."

PT
Painters Touch brand by Rust-Oleum.

punition
Form of graffiti that consists in repeating the same word endlessly covering a whole surface. It comes from the punition lines that kids do at school.

== R–W ==
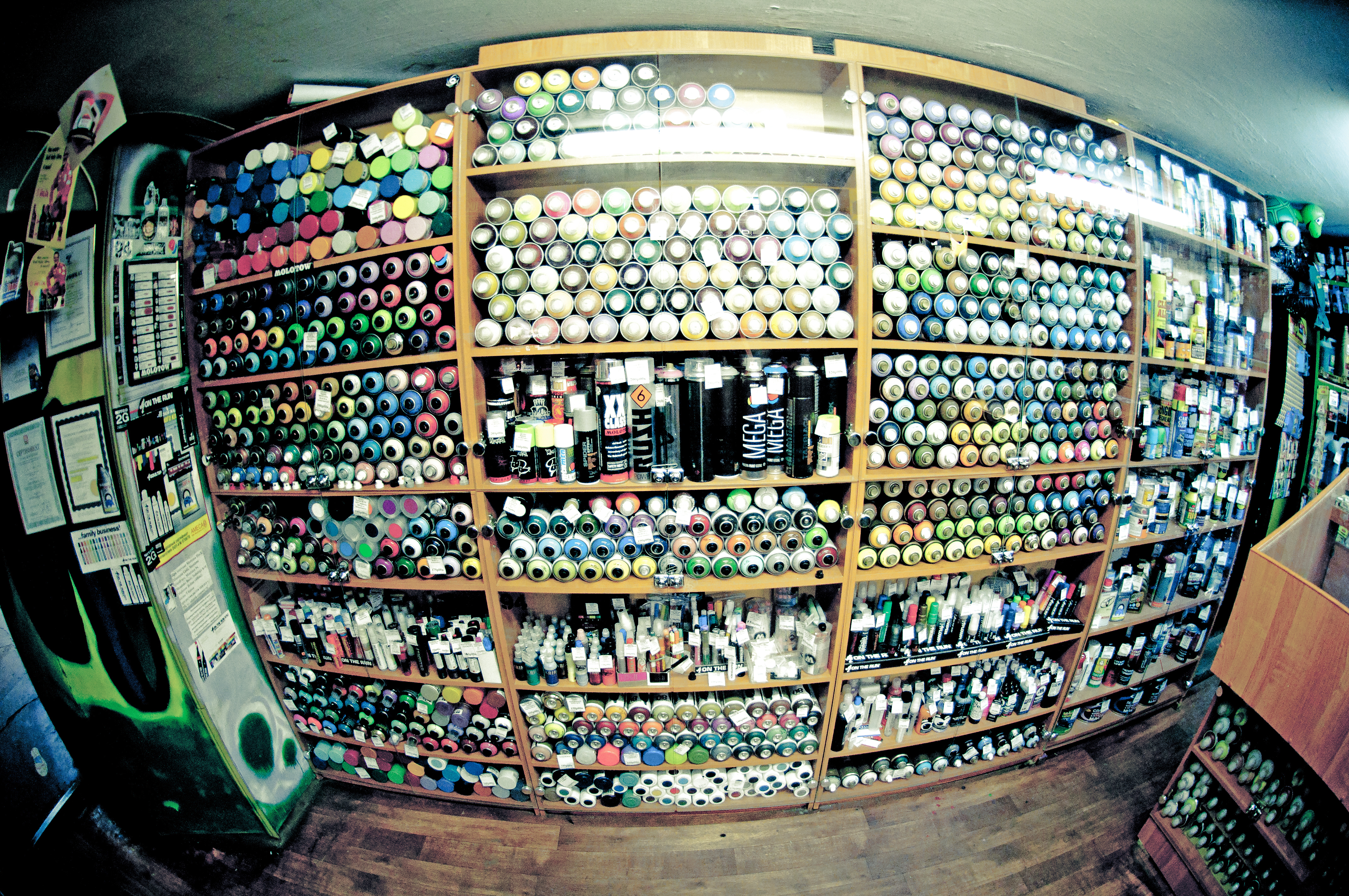
Graffiti shop is equipped with anti-theft system. Tver City, Russia.

racking
Shoplifting of supplies to be used either directly or indirectly in the production of graffiti. In certain segments of graffiti culture there exist writers that look down on those that pay for supplies that could easily be stolen. With the advent of companies specializing in producing supplies for writers over the last couple decades, this attitude is now mostly reserved for supplies purchased from non-specialty retailers (e.g. hardware stores, arts/crafts/hobby shops, etcetera), with specialty "graffiti brands" generally only available through retailers less convenient to shoplift from.

Acquiring supplies through various forms of fraud can also be referred to as "racking" in some circles, though this use is far less common, as is likewise the use of fraud as a means to acquire writing supplies (largely reserved only for items that cannot be conveniently shoplifted, such as those in locked cages or behind display counters).

roll call
A form of graffiti that lists out a partial or full roster of graffiti crew. Sometimes gang members will insert ally gangs into their roll call. Roll calls are generally created by gang participants but other graffiti practitioners may use them sometimes.

roller
A paint roller, or any graffiti created primarily or exclusively through the use of such a paint roller. Due to the rectangular application pattern inherent to the use of a paint roller, rollers most often make use of block lettering, though some writers that specialize in rollers develop advanced techniques to get around this shortcoming. Rollers will more often than not involve the use of extension poles, with the added reach allowing the writer to place a roller in places that would otherwise require the use of ladders or rope-access gear to reach with a spray can. While rollers come in a range of sizes, they are particularly favored for writing letters larger than can be practically accomplished with spray paint alone, and the largest examples of graffiti to be found are virtually all produced as rollers. Writers that work with rollers will typically aim to combine size, spot visibility, a color choice that contrasts with the chosen canvas, and highly legible block lettering, resulting in a roller that's recognizable from much further distances than feasible with spray techniques.

rook
Trusted member of a crew.

run
The length of time graffiti remains up before being covered or removed. If a piece has been up for a year, it is said to have "run for a year."

Rusto
A popular abbreviation among writers for the brand name Rust-Oleum spray paint.

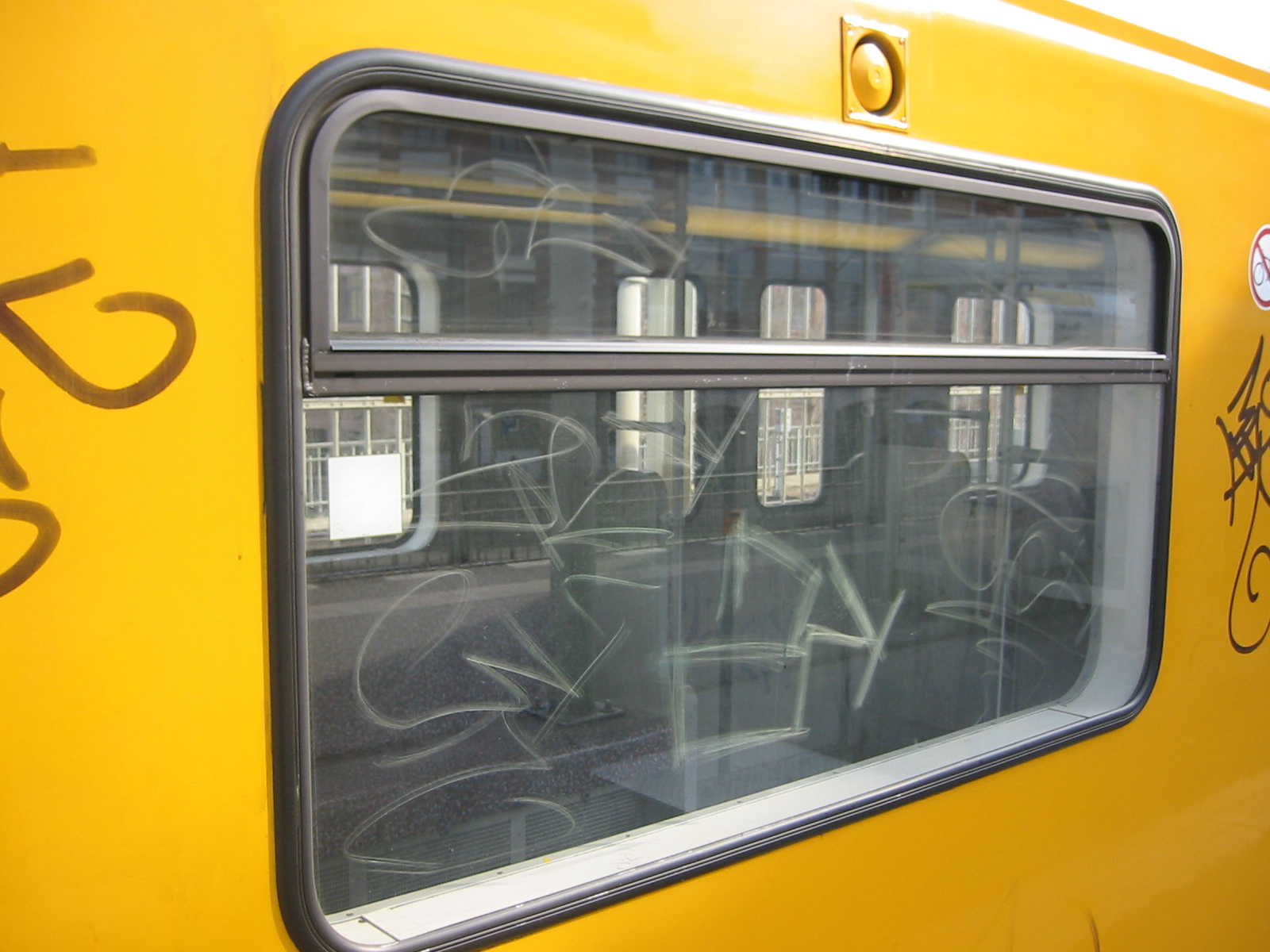
Scratching on Berlin subway windows

scribe or scratch
Also called "scratchitti," scribing graffiti created by scratching or incising a tag into an object, generally using a key, knife, stone, sand paper, ceramic drill bit, or diamond tipped Dremel bit. The Mohs scale of mineral hardness determines which stones or other objects will scratch what surfaces. Particularly popular for catching tags on mirrors and windows, when done properly the writer's mark will be indelible, remaining until either the chosen canvas is replaced, or the tag in question is obscured by additional scratching.

slam
To paint an extremely conspicuous or dangerous location.

slash
To put a line through or tag over another writer's work. This generally happens for one of two reasons: either the individual being crossed out is considered to be lacking in style or originality to the point that another writer considers them an eyesore, or the crossing-out is part of an ongoing conflict between two or more writers (or crews). As it takes no skill and very little effort to cross someone out, and even the most incompetent toy can become a serious nuisance once slighted, much of the time writers cross each other out anonymously. Crossing another writer out and taking credit for the act (by leaving one's tag behind) could be considered either a challenge (of the unfriendly variety) or an assertion of one's dominance over a given canvas or area, depending upon the particular circumstances. The aggression of writers toward one another can range from negligible to outright hostile depending upon various factors that helped shape the local scene's culture, such as the availability of suitable canvases for writing, the ways in which local government and law enforcement approach the "graffiti problem", or even just the relative number of writers in a city's population, and the sort of stratification of skill and talent among those actively partaking in the practice. In some areas, writers are less likely to cross out their peers without provocation, while in other cities it is pretty much a given that anyone just getting started in the discipline will find themselves constantly crossed out until they either improve or give up. Though the latter environment is certainly less welcoming to the novice, this sort of trial-by-fire helps discourage toys from making a mess of the place, while also pressuring them to better themselves.
Back before camera-phones/smartphones and the proliferation of social media websites, watching to see whether your work gets left alone used to be the only feedback from strangers you had to go off of.
It may also be referred to as, capping (see cap (2)), crossing out, dissing, going over, hating, marking, or to line, as in, "I lined their tag."

snitch
Someone who has detected or realized a writer is responsible for a tag and reports the writer to authority leading to arrest.

soak up
To consider other pieces for inspiration.

Spanish Montana
A way of referring to Montana Colors, a specialty brand of paint marketed for use in graffiti. It is unrelated to the German company of the same name, and it is common for writers to differentiate between the two in conversation by referencing each company's respective nation of origin.

stainer
Ink used in a marker with the intention of being absorbed by the surface, thus staining the surface and making it much more difficult to buff.

sticker

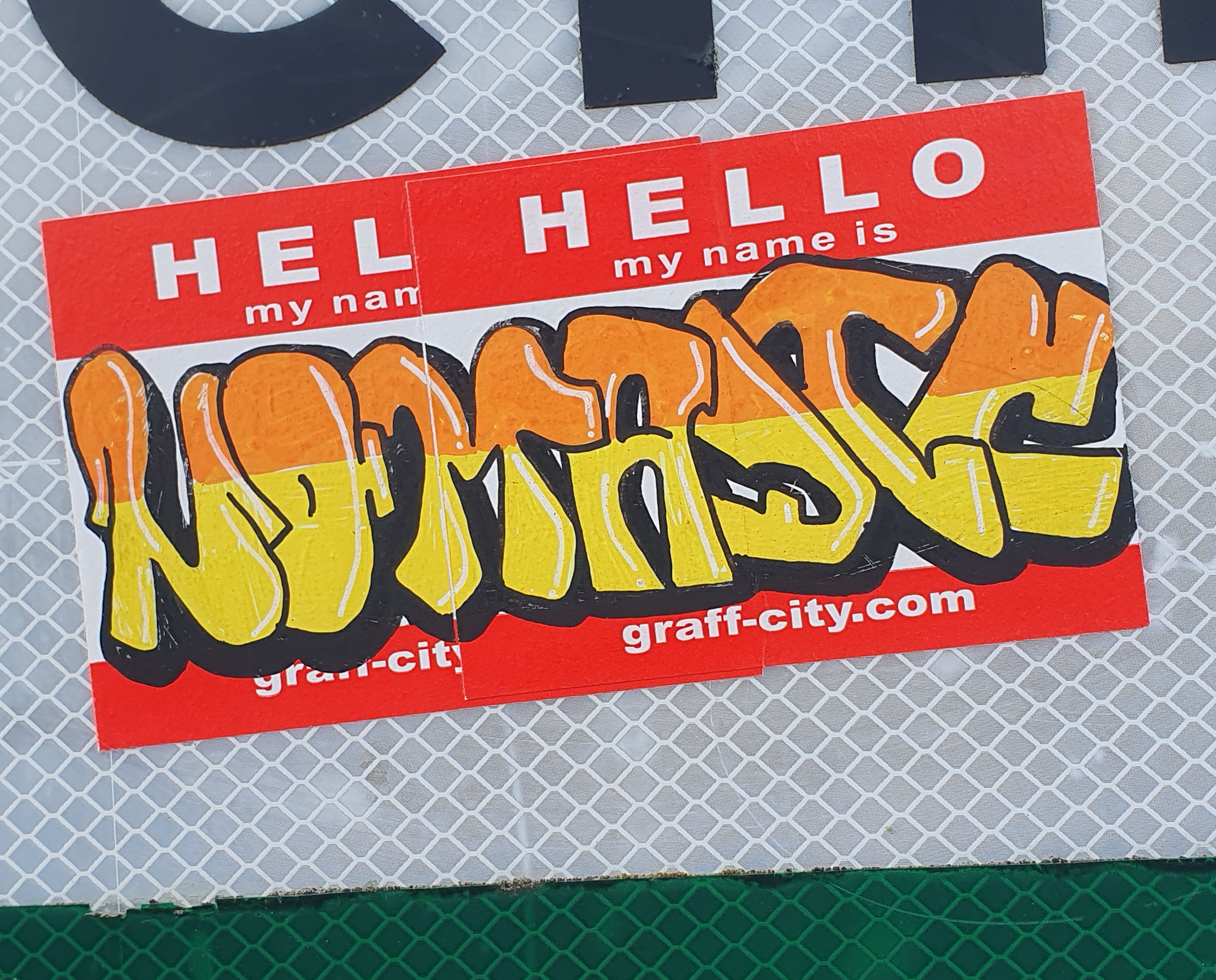
Graffiti sticker in St Ives, Cornwall

Also referred to as "labels" or "slaps." A sticker (often obtained from shipping companies and name greeting labels) with the writer's tag on it. Stickers can be deployed more discreetly than other forms of graffiti, making them a popular choice for public places such as crosswalk signs, newspaper dispensers, stop signs, phone booths, etc. A popular sticker that was used originally was the "Hello my name is" red stickers in which a writer would write their graffiti name in the blank space. Reflector stickers, found at hardware stores are sometimes assembled to form a crew meaning, or individual writer's moniker.

straight letter
A direct, blocky, easier to read and simpler style of graffiti, sometimes also referred to as straights, blockbusters, or simples. Straight letters can be read by anyone and usually contain only two colors and are most commonly completed in arrangements of silver, black, or white.

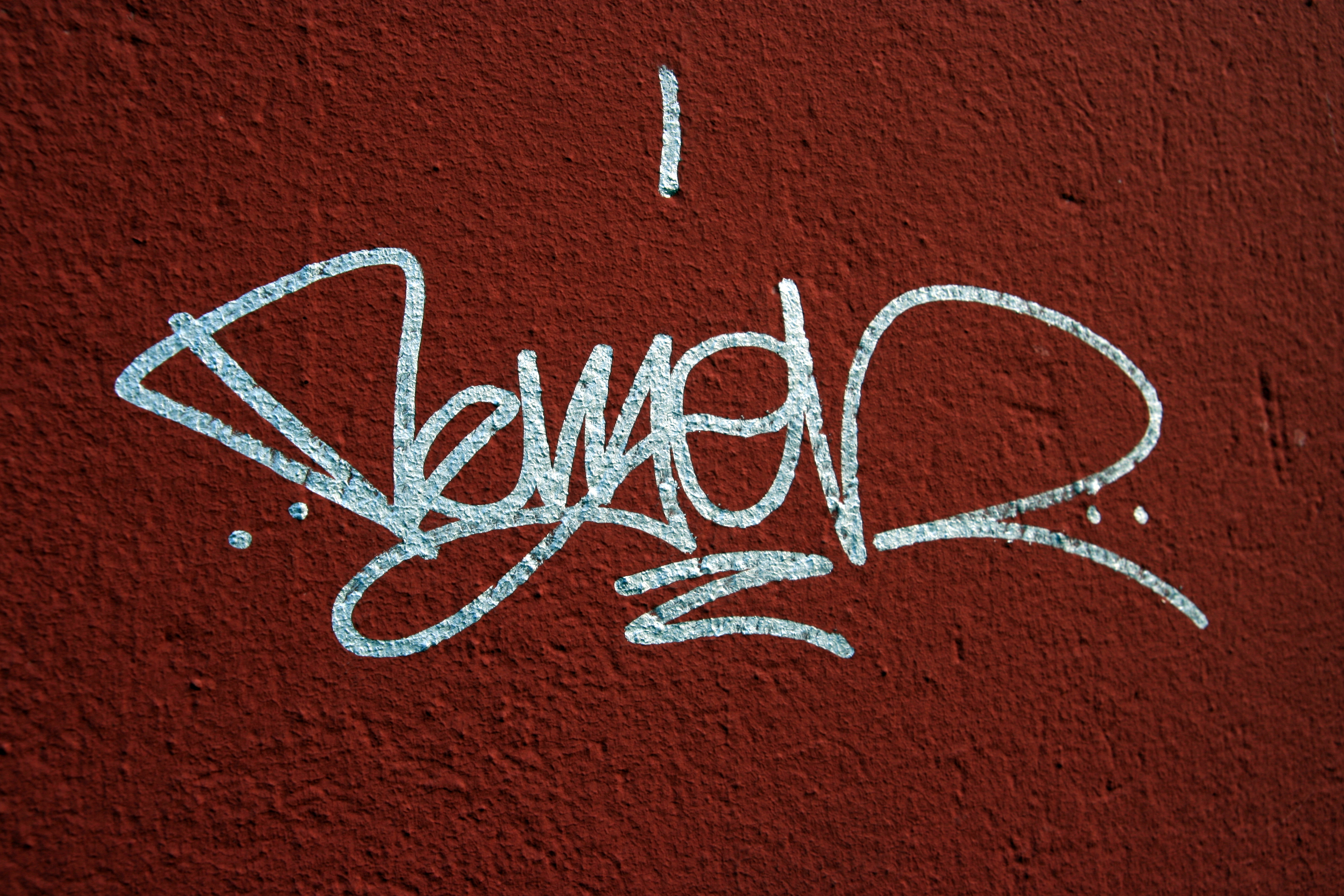
A graffiti tag

tag (scribble)
A stylized signature, normally done in one color. The simplest and most prevalent type of graffiti, a tag is often done in a color that contrasts sharply with its background. Tag can also be used as a verb meaning "to sign." Writers often tag on or beside their pieces, following the practice of traditional artists who sign their artwork. A less common type of tag is a "dust tag," done by smudging the dirt of a wall with the fingers. Writers use this technique to get up without technically vandalizing. The verb tagging has even become a popular verb today in other types of occasions that are non-graffiti-related. Tagging first appeared in Philadelphia, with spraypainted messages of "Bobby Beck In '59" on freeways surrounding the city. Since then, individual graffiti scenes have displayed very different forms of tagging that are unique to specific regions. For example, a Los Angeles tag will look very different from a Philadelphia tag, etc. The first "king" was also crowned in Philly: Cornbread (graffiti), a student who began marking his nickname around the city to attract the attentions of a girl. In New York City, TAKI 183 inspired a newspaper article about his exploits, leading to an explosion of tagging in the early seventies.

throw-up
A throw-up or "throwie" sits between a tag and a bomb in terms of complexity and time investment. It generally consists of a one-color outline and one layer of fill-color. Easy-to-paint bubble shapes often form the letters. A throw-up is designed for quick execution, to avoid attracting attention to the writer. Throw-ups are often utilized by writers who wish to achieve a large number of tags while competing with rival graffitists. Most graffitists have both a tag and a throw-up that are essentially fixed compared to pieces. It is mostly so because they need to have a recognizable logo for others to identify them and their own individual styles.

top-to-bottom
Pieces on trains that cover the whole height of the car. A top-to-bottom, end-to-end combined production is called a whole-car. A production with several writers might cover a whole-train, which means the entire side of the train has been covered. In the U.S. this term can also be used as a single noun instead of only an adjective.

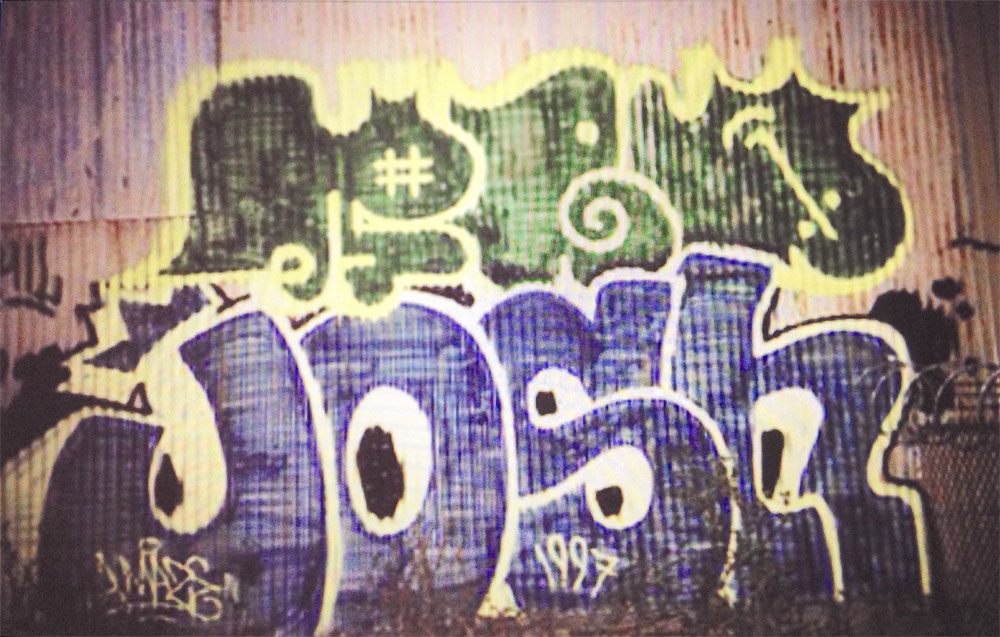
1998 photo in San Francisco of a Red throw-up 'topping' a Josh straight letter

topping
Painting directly above – but not over – someone else's work. A slightly passive-aggressive 'dis'.

toy
1. Used as an adjective to describe undesirable work, or as a noun referring to a novice or incompetent writer. Graffiti writers usually use this as a derogatory term for new writers in the scene, or writers who are old to the scene and still do not have any skill or reputation. The act of "toying" someone else's graffiti is to disrespect it by means of going over it (see "slash"/"going over").
2. "Toys" often added above or directly on a toy's work. An acronym meaning, "tag over your shit."
3. Term "HOT 110" also refers to graffitists not to be taken seriously.

undersides
Tags or signatures painted on the undercarriage of passenger trains. Undersides are normally marked in the yard after painting the train panel. Most undersides will last somewhat longer than the original piece, as the railway workers primarily focus on the most visible things and sometimes do not have resources to clean everything.

up
Writers become up when their work becomes widespread and well-known. Although a writer can get up in a city by painting only tags (or throw-ups), a writer may earn more respect from skillfully executed pieces or a well-rounded repertoire of styles than from sheer number of tags. Usually, the more spots a writer can hit, the more respect he or she gains. Usually, if the writer hits more spots with better style they will get more respect than someone who simply tags. A writer's ups is determined by how much prolific graffiti he/she has accomplished. Writers are considered "up" both in terms of the number of spots they have hit, but also those that are still running.

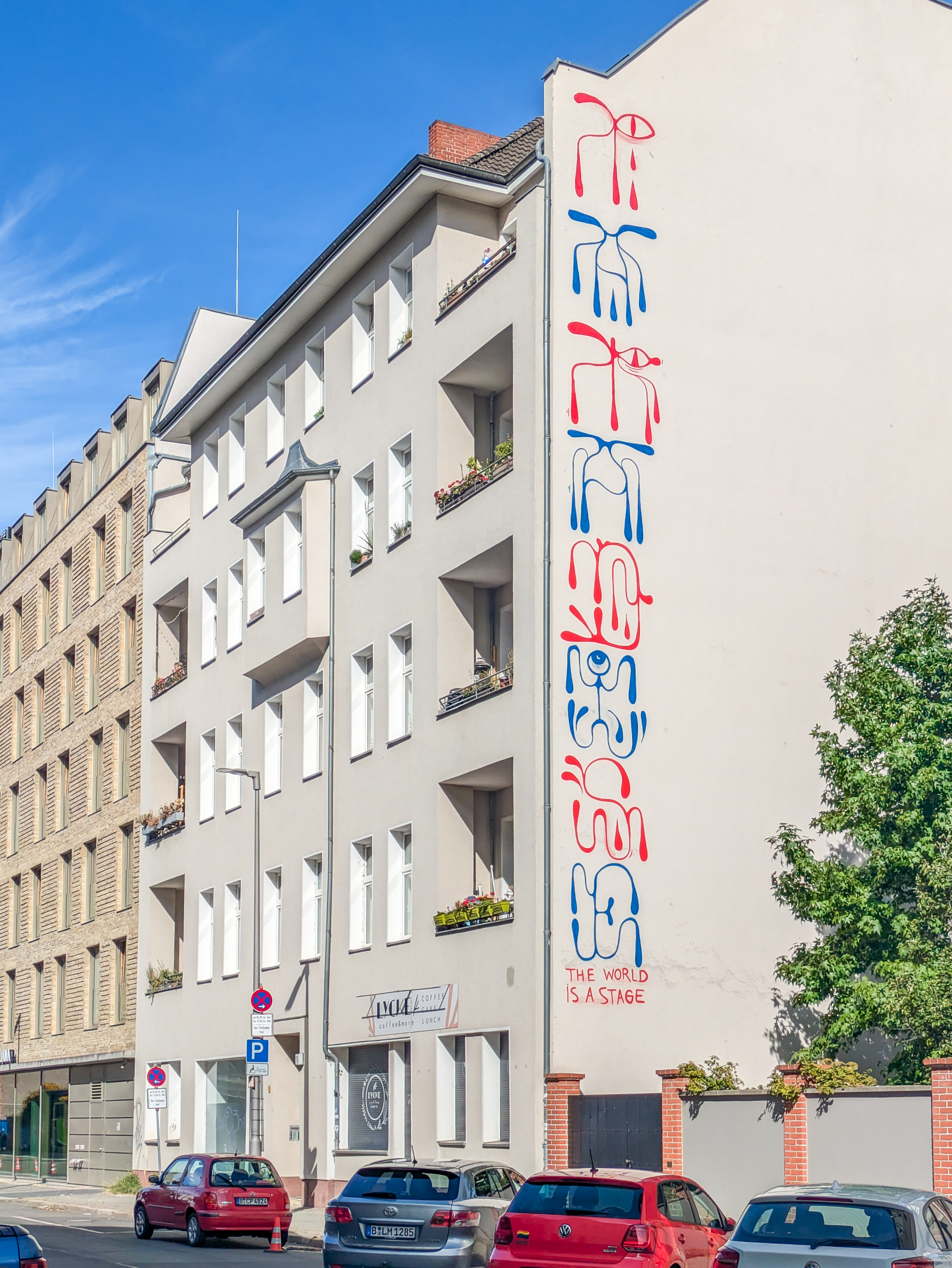
Vertical Rope Graffiti in Berlin by Berlin Kidz graffiti crew, 2024

vertical rope graffiti

Rope access technique to rapell from rooftops and create markings on vertical surfaces, often at significant heights.

A Sydney Trains T set travelling express from Strathfield to the Sydney CBD with whole car graffiti on its side, 2026

whole car
A single or collaborative piece that covers the entire visible surface of one side of a train car, usually excluding the front and rear of the train. A whole car is usually worked upon by one or more participants from the same crew and is completed in one sitting.

whole train
All train cars (usually between four and eight or more, regardless of the train length) completely covered with paint reaching the far end of the train on one or both sides. Such demanding actions are often done by multiple participants or crews and with a limited variation of colors – commonly in black and silver – because of the stressing time limitation they are facing when painting in the train yards (very often less than 30 minutes). However, the more participants who participate, the better works can come out of it and the cars are done quicker too. This type of graffiti, if successfully finished, is one of the most respected forms among other graffitists, but is also rarer due to the higher risk of getting caught. It has also been known that 'crews' of graffiti participants would demonstrate their 'whole cart/train' skills, usually carried out by waiting at a train/metro stop or station, waiting for the train to approach, then when stopped quickly cover the full area of the cart. This can be finished within 2 minutes of the train pulling into the station. The Freedom Train, painted by Caine 1 in 1976, has often been described as the first whole train painted in graffiti history.

Wildstyle
Graffiti with text so stylized as to be difficult to read, often with interlocking, three-dimensional type.

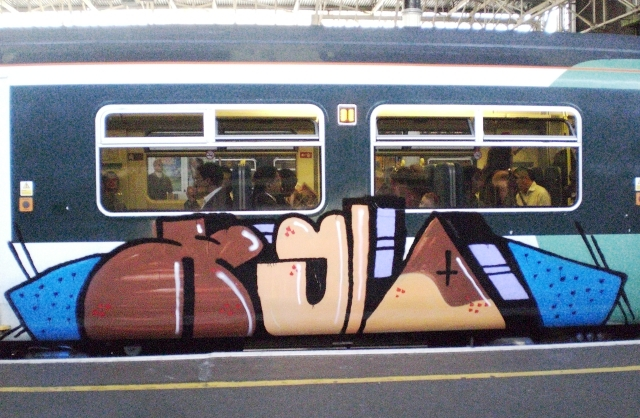
Example of a window-down on a BR Class 455, 2008

window-down (...)
Graffiti that has been painted below the window borders, almost always covering the whole surface in its length. The term is commonly used as a prefix with whole car, although other variations are possible, too. Can be used as a more precise alternative to end-to-end, but not in addition to top-to-bottom as that will exceed the definition of the term.

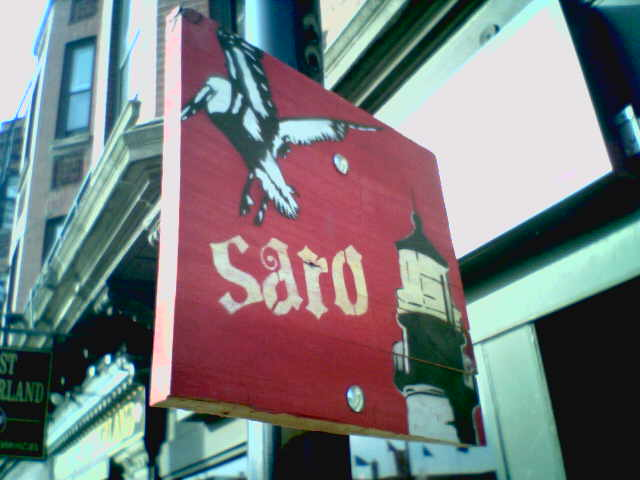
Example of woodblock

woodblock graffiti
Artwork painted on a small portion of plywood or similar inexpensive material and attached to street sign posts with bolts. Often the bolts are bent at the back to prevent removal.

writer
A practitioner of graffiti who creates graffiti formats for the purpose of graffiti vandalism.
