= Tox (graffiti artist) =

London graffiti artist

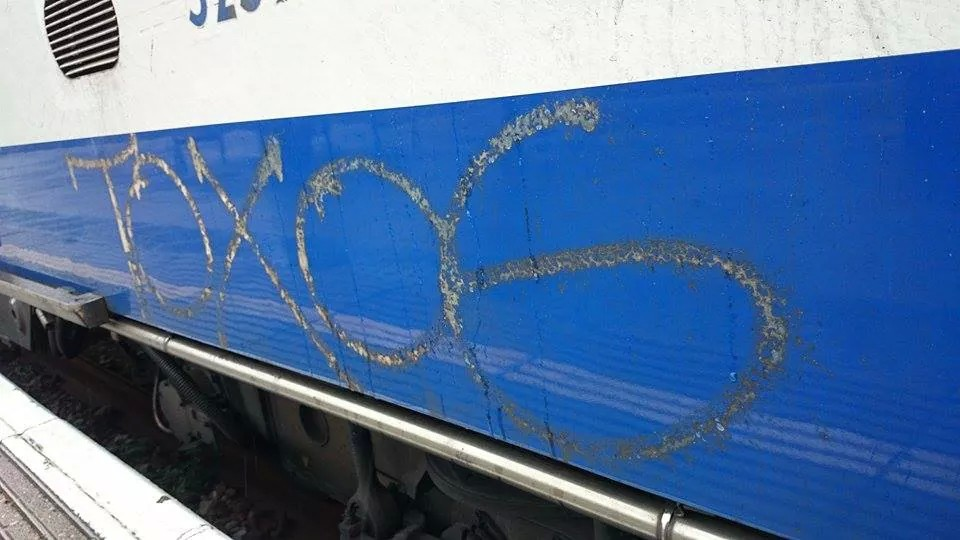
- TOX06 daubed on the side of London Underground 1995 Stock, 2014
- Born: Daniel Halpin; 1985 (age 40–41)
- Known for: Extensively tagging the London Underground network
- Style: Tagging
- Movement: Graffiti
- Awards: King of the London Underground

Tox is the tag of the London-based graffiti artist Daniel Halpin (born 1985). He is known for his blanket coverage of the London Underground network and walls around London and Glasgow, using the pseudonym Tox followed by a number indicating the year.

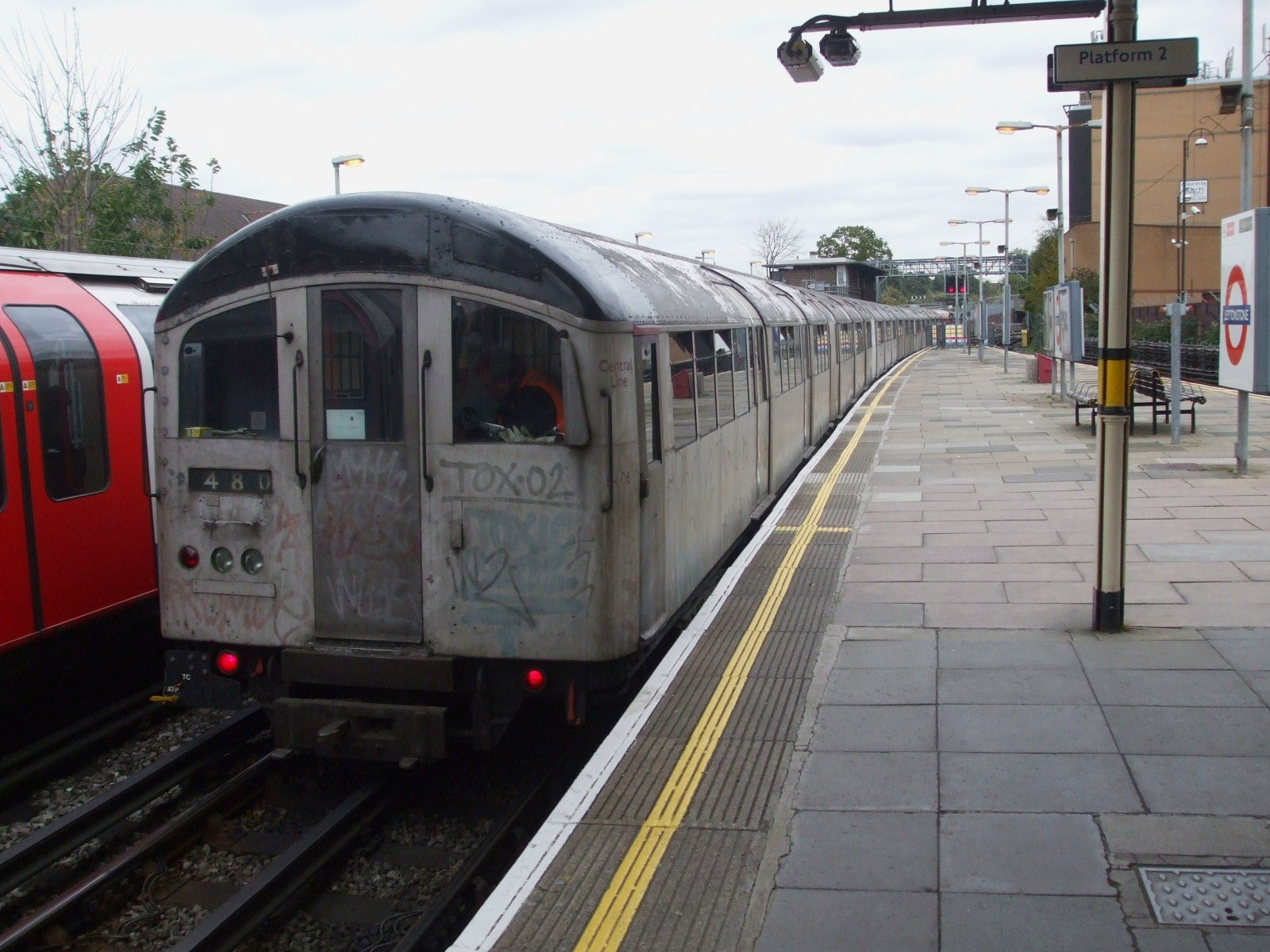
London Underground 1962 Stock engineering train adorned with "TOX02" and "TOXIC" on the front, 2008

== Biography ==
=== Tagging ===
Tox first began producing his graffiti tag in 1999 and by 2001 had developed a passion for tagging London Underground trains.

=== Legal issues ===
Tox was convicted of criminal damage in June 2011 and imprisoned after a history of ignoring ASBOs. Prosecutor Hugo Lodge told the court: "He is no Banksy. He doesn't have the artistic skills, so he has to get his tag up as much as possible." After his trial Ben Eine, another graffiti artist, criticised his work, saying: "His statement is Tox, Tox, Tox, Tox, over and over again." he said that the tags are "incredibly basic" and lacking "skill, flair or unique style". A sentence of 27 months was later passed, the judge commenting "There is nothing artistic about what you do".

=== Commercial endeavours ===
Tox has also sold works of art including canvases and screens-prints, most recently as 2023. Tox's work featured in the Long Dark Tunnel, a graffiti exhibition in partnership with fellow writer 10Foot, which opened in March 2025.
