= The Freedom Train (graffiti) =

1976 graffiti mural

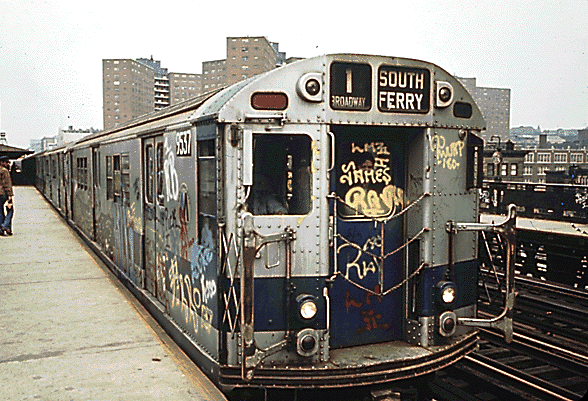
- An R36 train in the 1970s
- Artist: Caine 1
- Year: 1976
- Medium: Spray paint on steel
- Movement: Graffiti
- Subject: United States Bicentennial
- Dimensions: 17094 cm (6,730 in)
- Condition: Destroyed
- Location: New York City
- Owner: New York City Transit Authority

The Freedom Train was a graffiti mural painted on a New York City Subway train of R36s on July 3, 1976. The artwork was intended to commemorate the United States Bicentennial, but it was prevented from being seen in public by the New York City Transit Authority (NYCTA) who removed the train from public service. The Freedom Train gained subcultural fame as the first whole train painted in the history of graffiti.

== Background ==
The Freedom Train was the brainchild of the New York graffiti artist Caine 1. The painting was intended to commemorate the Bicentennial of the United States on July 4, 1976, incorporating Bicentennial themes and the flags of various US states. The images used included the contemporary flag of the United States, the flag of Puerto Rico, and the Gadsden flag, which was used as a symbol of protest by the People’s Bicentennial Commission at the time. Painted across the length of eleven carriages, Caine 1 executed the artwork in the Corona Yard, Queens alongside a group of fellow graffiti artists who endeavoured to cover as much of the surface of the train as possible including the interior.

== Aftermath ==
Immediately following the painting of the artwork, the train was withdrawn from service by the NYCTA and the majority of it destroyed. Caine 1 and two fellow artists involved were then arrested by the Transit Police the following day.

The graffiti artist LEE claimed that the subsequent arrest of the artists involved in the production of The Freedom Train was due to information having been intentionally passed on to the police.

== Legacy ==
Since its creation The Freedom Train has been subject to interpretation by both graffiti writers and historians, with the events surrounding its production and subsequent destruction having become something of an urban myth in New York. For many years The Freedom Train was considered to be the first whole train in graffiti history, although this accolade has been revised with the claim that the first whole train may have been produced by JAPAN 1 in the early 1970s. The Freedom Train has since been described more precisely as the first top-to-bottom whole train. Discussion of the artwork has also included speculation that The Freedom Train was inspired by the contemporary Freedom Train which toured the United States in 1975–76.

Following its destruction, it was generally believed that no photographic recording of The Freedom Train existed other than possible images made by the Transit Police as evidence. This lack of a photographic record has been credited with creating an aura of mystique around the artwork, although images of the train have come to light in recent years. At the beginning of the millennium the graffiti artist Dime 139 published copies of photographic recordings he had made of the original artwork online.

The reason for the reaction by the NYCTA to the artwork has been attributed to the challenge it posed to the effectiveness of their security measures, particularly down to the fact that it was eleven carriages long. It has also been proposed that the Metropolitan Transit Authority were concerned that the graffiti could be mistaken by the public as an officially sanctioned artwork commissioned for the city's Bicentennial celebrations.

Along with Caine 1 the names of various graffiti artists have been attributed to the execution the original artwork. Up to thirty other graffiti artists collaborated in producing The Freedom Train including Mad 103, Flame 1, Chino 174, Doc 1, Speedy, Tage 1, Roger, Dime 139, Spike, and Sly 108.

In response to the police murder of George Floyd in 2020, a mural entitled The Freedom Train was painted in Jack London Square, Oakland by the artist Painted Ladder.
