= List of graffiti and street-art injuries and deaths =

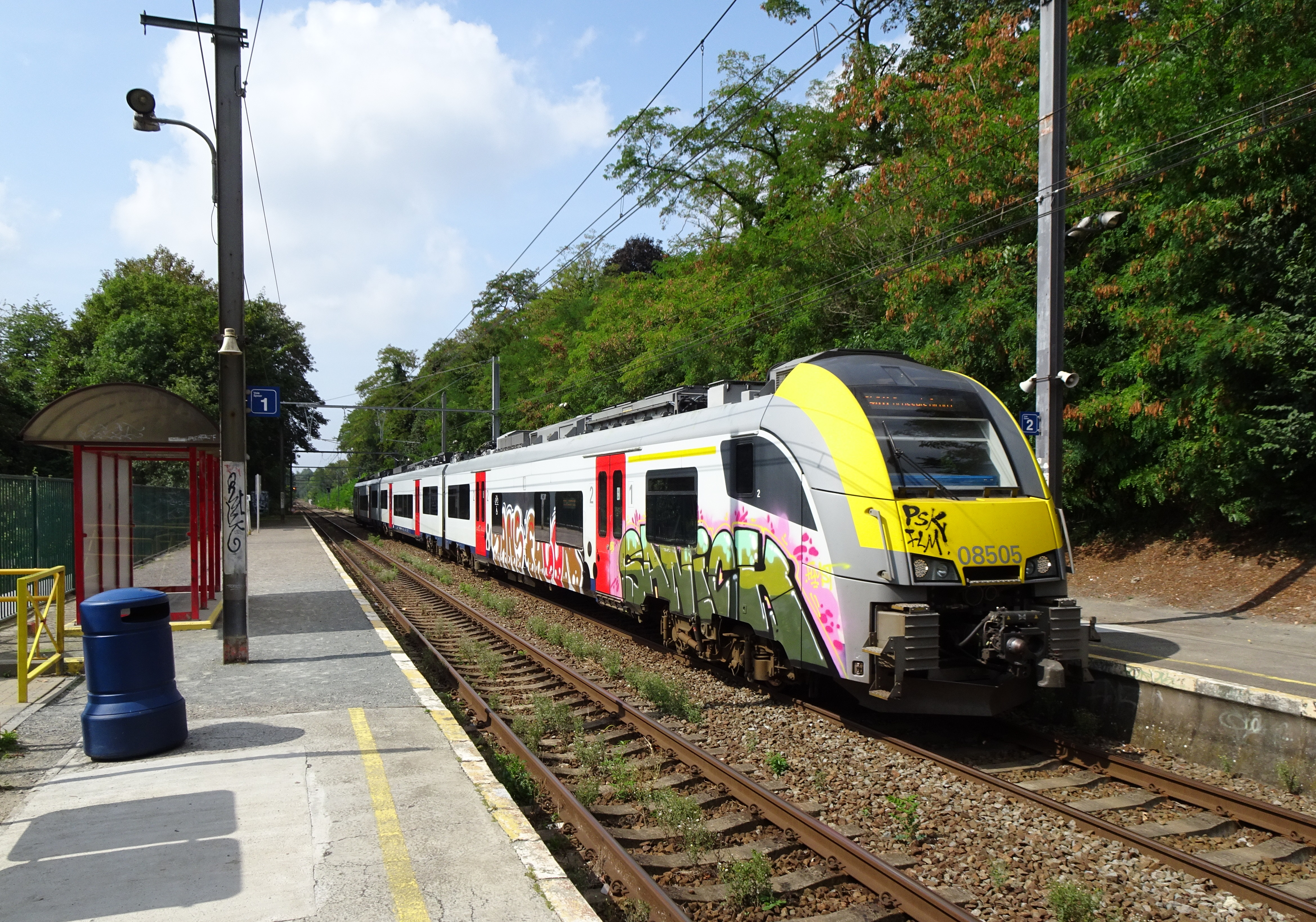
Brussels, 2018

This is a list of incidents involving injury or death to graffiti writers and street-artists before, during or after they created or attempted to create street art and graffiti.

== Overview ==
There were six people who died creating graffiti on train carriages in New South Wales by 1988. Nine people were seriously injured or died creating graffiti on railway property in New South Wales in the 18 months prior to December 2001.

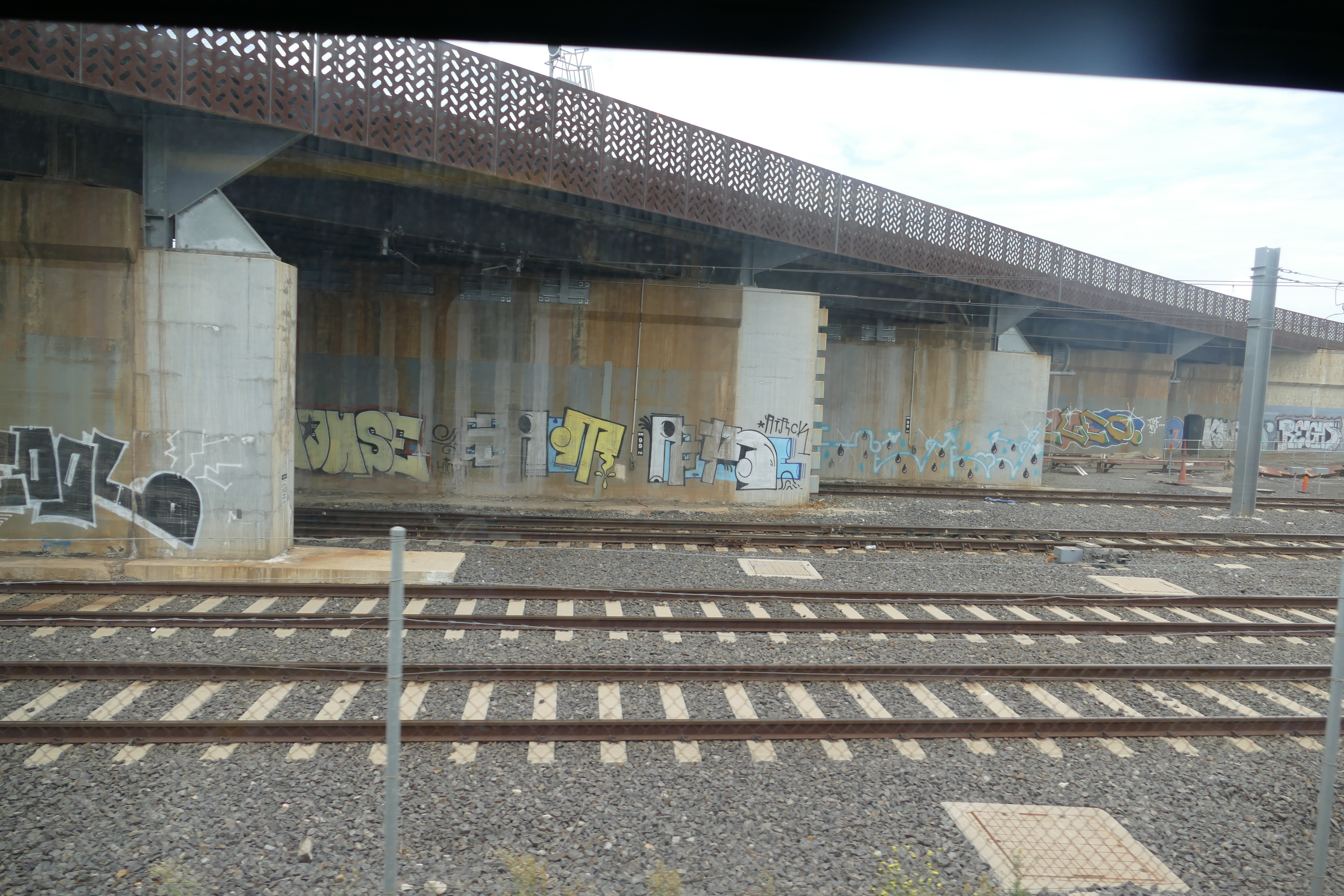
Graffiti underneath a railway bridge. A person may not be able to hear a train travelling along a railway track until it is too late to prevent a collision and when people move across railway lines they may not look to see if a train is approaching. Melbourne, Australia, 2020

In July 1988 in the London Underground there were people who had received "... electric shocks and burns crossing the 600-volt rails to tag a wall." In June 2008 in Los Angeles there had been "...taggers getting injured once every couple of months from falls or being 'clipped by a car'.". In relation to graffiti accidents in Berlin in the 1990's it was commented that there were "...quite a few writers who died then or later and who were active in the 90s...".

At the Munich Department of Cultural Affairs official guide to graffiti it comments on the risks that occur when creating graffiti along railway tracks "Apart from the difficulty of finding your bearings in the dark, on paths not intended for your use, and the danger of getting caught in the switches of the tracks, the biggest threat by far is posed by incoming trains. Even experienced sprayers sometimes misjudge these risks, which regularly leads to fatal accidents. Likewise, coming into contact or even just close proximity to the power lines (electric arc) located next to the tracks or above the trains can have lethal consequences in a matter of seconds."

=== Taking photos ===
When people have taken photos after they have just finished creating graffiti there have been accidents where deaths have occurred. In Los Angeles in 1993, a 23-year-old man was on train tracks with a group of friends in order to spray paint graffiti on the side of a freight carriage. He was taking photos of the graffiti when the sound of an approaching train was heard. He began to move across the tracks, but was fatally hit by the train.

In Russia in 2020 a 22-year-old who had created graffiti at a train station climbed up onto a train carriage to take a photo, where he received an electric shock and died.

In Ukraine in 2015 a 15-year-old was painting graffiti on train carriages and they then climbed up onto the roof of a carriage for a photo and they received an electric shock which set their clothing on fire and they died.

=== Electric arcs ===
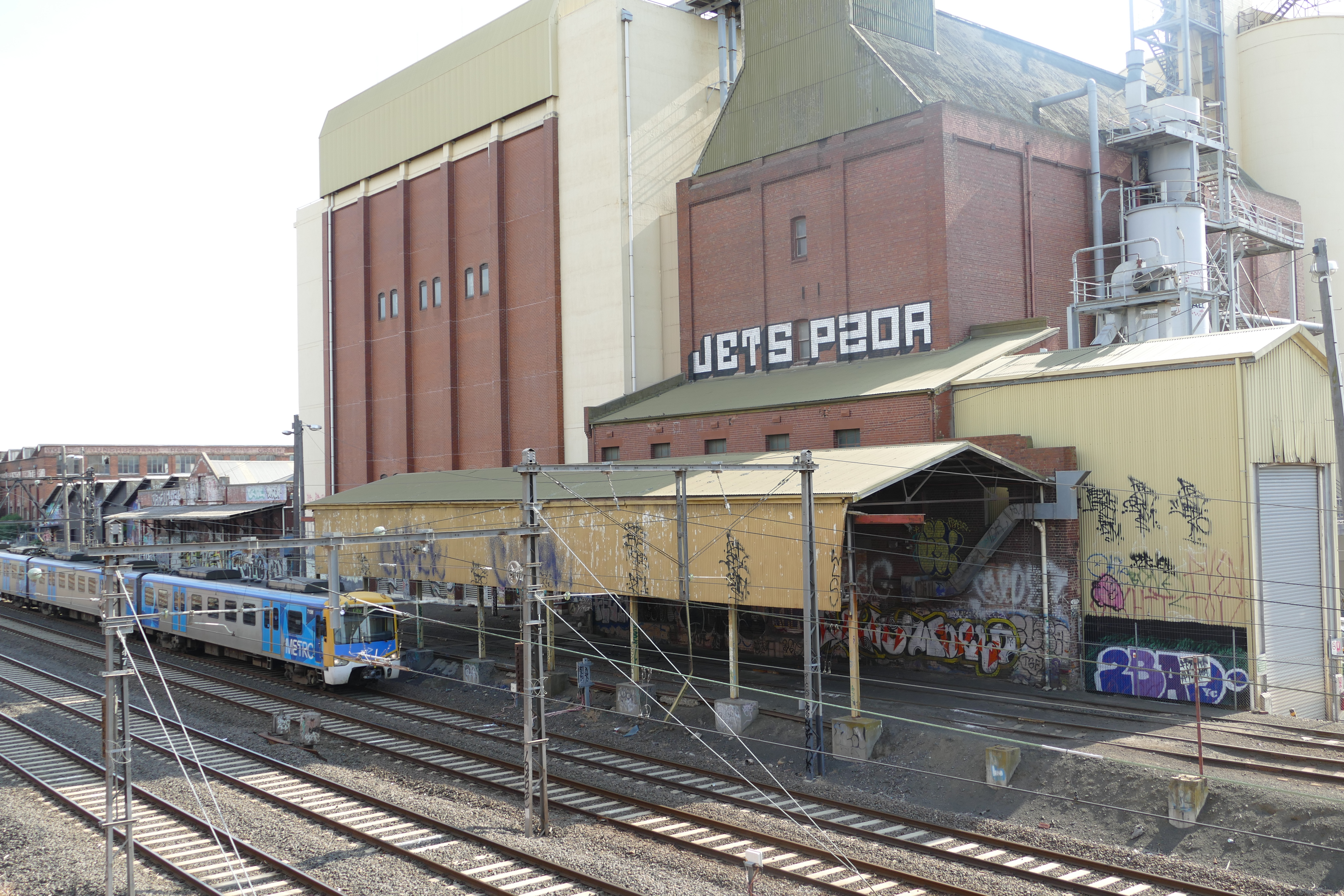
Tags that appear on the side of this building have occurred when people climbed onto the roof of parked train carriages. Overhead power lines on the roofs of trains can create electric arcs that will give a person an electric shock from a distance of up to 1.5 metres. Melbourne, Australia. 2020

Overhead power lines on railways are able to create electric arcs and it has been commented that "Importantly, electrocution may occur even in the absence of direct contact, as high voltage arcs can discharge through the air and cause devastating injuries." In 2013 Julius Gerhardt was spraying graffiti on freight carriages when he climbed on top of a carriage to tag a bridge. He was holding a spray can in his right hand, and an electric arc jumped over to the spray can and went through his hand, arm, and chest, then exited out of his right foot. He lost consciousness and was then lifted up and carried to a street by the people who were with him. He was in a coma in hospital for 36 hours, and then later put into a medically induced coma for a week. He received burns to over 90% of his body. Gerhardt commented that "I didn't know about arcs. In the arc, like lightning, electricity is conducted through the air. I had the spray can in my right hand. When I raised my hand, the metal became an antenna. The air transmitted the voltage—and I flew off the train car." It has further been commented that "...it is quite possible that from a distance of one meter, a breakdown [electric arc] will occur on a wristwatch, a phone in a pocket or a belt buckle, that is, on any metal object."

For an electric arc to occur there does not need to be a metallic object on a persons body as the high amount of water in human bodies is enough to create an electric arc and it has been commented that "...on the roof of an electric train, there is a risk of injury due to electric shock at a distance of up to 1.5 meters from the high-voltage contact wire. That is, to receive a strong electric shock, it is not necessary to touch the wire - it is enough to be in close proximity. The nominal voltage of the contact wire is 3000 volts. Under operating conditions, it varies from 2000 to 4000 volts. The distance at which the electric current strikes varies depending on the voltage in the contact network and climatic conditions - for example, humidity or air temperature."

In 2013 a 15 year-old was train surfing when an electric arc jumped over to his body from overhead power lines. He was taken to hospital and was in a critical but stable condition, and it was thought that he had not "...touched the cables but was struck by an arc of electricity after getting too close to the wires." In 2012, a 17-year-old in Ebersberg climbed onto the roof of a train; after the train moved a few metres, he was hit by an electric arc, and the train stopped moving due to a short circuit. He fell off the side of the train and received burns to 75% of his body. He was put into an artificial coma and was in a very critical condition. At the time of the accident it was commented that "The current radiates from a cable like that up to 1.5 meters away. This is called an arc. So you don't even have to touch the line directly to get an electric shock...".

== Graffiti and street art injuries and deaths ==
Date	Country	Type	Died or injured	Ages	Description
7 September 1973	United States	Collision with train	Died	15	B Brown was killed while he and 2 of his friends were spraying graffiti on an expedition in a Queens subway station when he was then struck by an oncoming train.
28 September 1983	United States	Choked or strangled	Died	25	Michael Stewart was arrested in New York City for tagging and was beaten badly while in police custody. He was pronounced dead 13 days later as a result of police brutality.
December 1986	Australia	Collision with signal box	Died	14	A teen boy was leaning out of a moving train while attempting to spray paint graffiti on the side of the train, when his head collided with a signal box. He later died from his injuries.
9 November 1987	United Kingdom	Dragged by train	Died	11	An 11-year-old died when he was at an underground station next to the tracks trying to graffiti trains and a train dragged him 50 yards (45 m) into a tunnel. It is speculated that he had been opposite the platform hiding in a gap in a wall so that he could lean out to graffiti trains, and his clothing may have been caught on a train, which resulted in him being dragged into a tunnel.
Late 1988	Australia	Collision with signal box	Died	15	A teen boy died when while hanging out of a moving train to paint the outside of it.
11 August 1989	Australia	Collision with signal box	Died	16	A teen boy died when he was leaning from a train carriage door and his head collided with a signal box. A marker pen was found on the railway tracks nearby, there was fresh graffiti on the train, and the person had previously graffitied the inside of the train carriage.
29 November 1989	United States	Collision with train	Died	17, 19	Two people died when they had been spray painting graffiti on the walls of a subway train tunnel and a train collided with them.
16 December 1989	Australia	Collision with train	Injured	15	A person was leaning out the side of a moving train and they were attempting to create graffiti on the side of the train using a felt pen when they fell underneath the wheels of the train about 400 metres (1,300 ft) from a train station. Their left leg was amputated and they received microsurgery on their right leg and it was uncertain as to whether the person would need to have their right leg amputated.
20 February 1992	Switzerland	Collision with train	Died	15, 16	Two teenagers died when they were attempting to spray graffiti on a railway electricity shed and were hit by a train.
8 November 1992	Germany	Collision with train	Died	Both 17	Two people died after they were on a railway line and a train collided with them. It is speculated that they had been on the railway line in relation to the creation of graffiti.
25 May 1993	Australia	?	Died	21	A person died when they were hanging out of a moving train while attempting to create graffiti and were crushed to death.
25 June 1993	United States	Collision with train	Died		Skate or SK8 of CBS crew died in Los Angeles, after they had been taking photos of a freight train that they had created graffiti on the side of and then they began moving across train tracks and a passing Amtrak train collided with them.
26 April 1995	Australia	Collision with bridge	Died	14	A person died when they were leaning out the door of a moving train and they were spraying graffiti on the side of the train and they collided with a road bridge.
7 May 1995	United States	Electric shock	Died	16	A teenager died when they were attempting to spray paint a wall and they touched an electrical transformer behind them receiving an electric shock. They were standing on a platform two to three stories above the ground and the amount of space between the edge of the platform and the three electrical transformers behind them was estimated at one foot.
6 May 1996	Germany	Collision with train	Died	14	Two 14-year-olds were alongside railway lines and one of the 14-year-olds wanted to spray their tag on the side of a noise barrier that was next to the railway line. An InterRegio train then collided with both 14-year-olds and one of the 14-year-olds died in the collision.
2 October 1996	Australia	Collision with bridge	Died	15	A person died when they climbed up onto the roof of a moving train and whilst on the roof of the train they attempted to create graffiti and as the train was approaching a station they hit the overhead wires. They were taken to hospital and died the following day.
18 December 1996	Germany	Collision with train	Died	17, 19	Two people died when they were at Baumschulenweg station in Berlin on railway lines graffiti tagging and a train collided with them. It has been further commented that "Shortly before Christmas 1996, FRÄSK and SPOA had a tragic accident while backjump painting in Baumschulenweg. PRINS was probably the last person to have contact with Enrico and Lars. He said goodbye to both of them at 7 p.m. and they went on their way to Baumschulenweg. The backjump in Baumschulenweg is located directly on a regional railway line. Coming from one direction, the train goes through a curve, making it difficult to hear it. The train driver did not even notice the accident." A backjump involves waiting for a train to stop at a train station and then while it is temporarily stationary moving over to the train and attempting to create graffiti on the side of it before it moves away again.
1997	United States	Collision with train	Injured	?	A person's foot was severed while they were painting the side of a train.
11 June 1997	United States	Fall	Injured	19	Daniel Supple, or Ozie, was injured in Los Angeles when they fell 100 feet (30 m) from the top of a concrete overpass support pylon above a freeway. They had been on the top of the pylon spraying graffiti on the side of the overpass, when they fell onto an embankment along the freeway. They received injuries including spinal fractures, two broken ankles and a broken left arm.
18 March 1998	United States	Gunshot	Died	18	Tie One, "his legal name was Jonathan See Lim. He was 18. He was shot and killed while climbing on a fire escape outside a" San Francisco apartment. His back pack was filled with spray paint.
January 1999	France	Electric shock	Died	19	A person climbed onto the roof of a train carriage that they were looking to tag, and they received an electric shock from the overhead power lines and died.
August 1999	United States	Unconfirmed	Died	?	A person died when they fell from a railroad trestle bridge and it was speculated that a collision may have occurred with a train that was travelling past and they fell 40 feet (12 m) from the bridge. It was also speculated that they jumped from the bridge to avoid a train. The person had been painting graffiti at the bridge.
28 December 1999	Germany	Collision with train	Died	21	A person was inside a railway tunnel and they had spray painted tags on the walls of the tunnel. It is thought that the person saw a train coming and moved away from the railway track. A second train was coming down a second railway track and the person then collided with the front carriage of this second train. The accident occurred at 5:25am and the person was taken to hospital where they died at 8pm.
April 2001	United Kingdom	Collision with train	Died	18	A person died when they were spray painting graffiti beside a railway line and a train collided with them.
3 August 2001	Germany	Collision with train	Died	19, 20	Two people died when they had sprayed graffiti on the pillar of a bridge beside railway lines and a train travelling at 100 km/h (62 mph) collided with them several meters away from where the graffiti was on the pillar.
19 March 2002	Australia	Collision with train	Died	19	A person died when a train collided with them on railway lines and it is speculated the person had been attempting to create graffiti. They found spray paint cans and other graffiti related objects near where the person was found lying dead on the railway track.
9 May 2003	Australia	Collision with train	Died	16	A person died when they had been spraying graffiti on the side of a railway line and then a train collided with them and the collision with the train occurred the width of two train tracks away from where they had been creating graffiti.
2003	Portugal	Electric shock	Died	21	A person died when they were walking alongside train lines in an underground train tunnel, and fell onto a live third rail and received an electric shock. They were found lying on the track with a can of paint next to them.
17 September 2003	United States	Collision with train	Died	24	A person died when they were underneath a bridge and a passing train collided with them. Fresh graffiti was found underneath the bridge, and a backpack with spray paint cans was close to the persons body.
1 February 2005	Canada	Collision with train	Died	18	A person died when a passing train collided with them and prior to the collision they had been spray painting a tag on the outside of a stationary freight carriage.
21 June 2005	France	Electric shock	Died	20	A person began spray painting a wagon in the Paris Métro and had been able to walk on the live third rail without receiving an electric shock. Railway workers maintaining the track nearby had turned off the electric current and then reconnected it once they had finished work. He then began to leave the railway tracks and dropped an object that he then went to pick up, and while doing so lost his balance, fell on the third rail, and received an electric shock and was killed.
21 December 2005	United Kingdom	Collision with train	Died	17	A person died when they had been on railway lines and an express train passing through collided with them. It is speculated that they had been on the track in relation to writing graffiti on trains.
4 May 2006	United States	Gunshot	Died	19	Two people were spraying graffiti on a residential house until a 17-year-old home owner notices them, pulls out a gun, and attempted to shoot them. The 19-year-old was shot, the other graffiti painter took him to the HCMC but then died a short time later.
Prior to April 2007	United States	Fell between train carriages	Died	?	In the 2007 graffiti documentary Bomb It it was commented that a graffiti artist died when they fell from a moving train between train carriages and onto the train tracks and both of their legs were amputated by the train.
Prior to April 2007	United States	Fell between train and the platform	Died	?	In the 2007 graffiti documentary Bomb It it was commented that a graffiti artist died when they fell between the train carriages when a train was leaving a train station and they landed between the train and the platform and the moving train broke every rib in their chest.
5 January 2007	United States	Collision with train	Died	13	A teenager was writing tags on signal boxes close to railway tracks when they began to leave the area they were tagging. They were going across a row of multiple railway tracks when they collided with a train going at 45 miles per hour (72 km/h) and they died. It is speculated that a second train that had been travelling down the tracks had obstructed their view of the train that they collided with.
16 May 2007	United States	Electric shock	Died	18	A person was sitting on top of an electrical transformer inside an electricity substation spraying graffiti when an electric arc struck them. They received burns injuries to most of their body and they died in hospital two days later.
2008	United States	Collision with car	Died	?	A person died when they were attempting to spray paint a median area and a car collided with them.
20 January 2008	Australia	Drowning	Died	21, 25	Two people were inside a stormwater drain spraying graffiti on the side of it when it began raining heavily. A sudden increase in water in the drain swept them a kilometre (about half a mile) down the drain and both people drowned.
13 April 2008	Australia	Fall	Injured	14	A 14-year-old had been spraying graffiti on the side of a building and they were walking over a fibreglass roof when it collapsed and they fell 6 metres (20 ft) to the ground and they received severe facial injuries, broken teeth, a broken jaw, fractures to their legs and a fractured wrist.
May 2008	United Kingdom	Fall	Injured	24	While graffiti tagging, a person fell from a multi-story building and received head and internal injuries and a broken back.
21 June 2008	United States	Fall	Injured	?	It was speculated that a person was spraying graffiti on an overpass when they fell onto a freeway. They were clutching a can of spray paint as they lay on the freeway. It is thought that they may have broken their back in the fall and they were taken to hospital for treatment.
15 July 2008	United States	Gang violence	Died/Injured	6, 16, 26, 51	Three out of four people died on the same day in Los Angeles when two were spray painting graffiti, one confronting the gang members, and a 6-year-old was spray painted in the face.
10 October 2008	Germany	Collision with train	Died	31	A person died and it was speculated that they were spraying graffiti on a bridge and a collision with a train occurred.
20 January 2009	Netherlands	Collision with train	Died, Injured	17, 18	A 17-year-old and an 18-year-old collided with a train; it is speculated that the two were painting a wall with graffiti, as spray paint cans were found lying next to the railway line. The 17-year-old was killed when the train collided with him, and the 18-year-old received serious injuries.
20 February 2009	United States	Fall / Collision with car	Died	28	It was speculated that a person was on the catwalk of a roadway sign when they fell 24 feet (7.3 m) to the expressway below. Later, a car travelling down the expressway reached the location where they were lying on the road and a collision occurred. There was silver graffiti that had been newly painted on the roadway sign above the person on the freeway, and they had a can of silver spray paint with them.
16 December 2009	Denmark	Electric shock	Died	17	A person died when they were standing on the roof of a train and received an electric shock, and fell off the train to the ground. It is thought they had been graffiti tagging trains.
19 March 2010	Germany	Collision with train	Died	19	A person died when they were on railway lines looking to spray graffiti on a train that was stationary on the train tracks, and a collision occurred when a train travelled past them.
28 June 2010	United States	Disease	Died	50	Rammellzee spent his final days in Far Rockaway, Queens spray-painting subway cars from where he originally began his graffiti artwork and career to the place on where he died due to a heart disease.
4 July 2010	United Kingdom	Fall	Died	22	A person was walking across a warehouse roof to gain access to a railway line where they were intending to create graffiti, when they fell through a skylight on the roof. They received head injuries, and later died in hospital.
9 July 2010	Germany	Collision with train	Died	Both 15	Two 15-year-olds were spray painting graffiti on the side of a freight train carriage. Another set of train tracks were next to them and an ICE train traveled past them on these tracks at an estimated 120 km/h (75 mph). It was reported that, "According to the first statements by the ICE train driver, the 15-year-olds still tried to get off the tracks. "We assume that you (they) saw the train,"...The train driver had tried with an emergency signal and braking to prevent the accident... "If they had lay down flat, it might have turned out lightly..." One 15-year-old died immediately from the injuries he received, and the second died from his injuries the following day.
23 October 2010	Poland	Collision with train	Died	19	A person died when they had finished spray painting the wall of a viaduct; it is thought that they went to paint a freight train that was slowly travelling past. A second train traveled past them on the track, and a rush of air pulled them underneath the wheels of the train.
31 October 2010	Canada	Collision with train	Died	17 (all three)	Three 17-year-olds died when they were intending to spray paint graffiti under a road bridge and a passing train collided with them. It is thought that the train was quiet as it travelled down the tracks and they did not hear it coming.
26 May 2011	United States	Collision with train	Died	20	A person died when they were walking on train tracks and a train collided with them. Cans of spray paint were found close to their body.
29 August 2011	Australia	Fall	Died	17	A person died after they fell 15 metres (50 ft) from a road bridge. It is speculated they had been spraying graffiti on the side of the bridge, as a backpack was found with the body that had spray cans inside.
11 January 2012	Australia	Collision with train	Died	18	An 18-year-old died when they were walking through a train underpass that went underneath a road bridge and a train collided with them. They were walking through the underpass as they were looking to graffiti a wall. One other person, who was there at the time with the person on the train tracks, described the approach of the train as "...something that they had been unable to hear until they saw it.".
March 2013	United States	Fall	Died	22	A person was spray painting graffiti on a bridge overpass and they fell from the bridge. Their body was later found nearby. There was recently applied red graffiti on the bridge near where their body was, as well as similar paint on their hands.
1 April 2013	United States	Undetermined	Died	30	A person was killed from what was thought to be asphyxiation after the rope that they were using to move down the outside of a high rise building wound tightly around their chest and suffocated them. Their knees were up around their chest inside of the rope in a technique called a "body belay". Their body was found still on the rope at the 17th floor of the office building. They were not wearing any climbing equipment. Spray paint cans and etching tools were found on the roof of the building.
7 July 2013	United Kingdom	Fall	Died	16	A teenager died when they fell from a three-storey building that they had been spray painting.
8 August 2013	United States	Taser	Died	18	An 18-year-old died after being shot by a taser gun after he was caught spray-painting graffiti on a building by his tag name "Reefa".
27 October 2013	Germany	Collision with train	Unconfirmed	25	A person was on a bridge next to railway lines writing graffiti on a wall and a passing train collided with them. The collision with the train occurred at about 7:10am. Just after 8am the train driver of another train that was passing by saw the person lying unconscious on the side of the railway line. The injuries they received included severe head injuries and they were placed in an induced coma, and a day after the accident had occurred it was uncertain as to whether they would survive.
31 October 2013	Germany	Electric shock from arc	Injured	21	In 2013 Julius Gerhardt was spraying graffiti on freight carriages when they climbed on top of a carriage intending to tag a bridge. They were holding a spray can in their right hand, and an electric arc jumped over to the spray can and went through their hand, arm, and chest, then exited out of their right foot. They lost consciousness and were then lifted up and carried to a street by the people with them. They were in a coma in hospital for 36 hours, and then later put into a medically induced coma for a week. They received burns to over 90% of their body. Half of their burns injuries healed by themself and half were repaired using 10 skin graft operations that occurred over a period of 3 to 4 months. Gerhardt later commented that "I didn't know about arcs. In the arc, like lightning, electricity is conducted through the air. I had the spray can in my right hand. When I raised my hand, the metal became an antenna. The air transmitted the voltage—and I flew off the train car."
26 December 2013	Germany	Electric shock	Died	15	A teenager died when they were in a freight train yard looking for a location to create graffiti when they climbed a ladder attached to the side of a freight train carriage, and received an electric shock from overhead power lines.
17 March 2014	France	Collision with tunnel	Died	20	A person died when they leaned out of a train window to spray graffiti on the outside of a train and collided with the entrance to a tunnel.
25 May 2014	Greece	Electric shock	Died	17	A person died when they were at a train station intending to graffiti trains and they were going across train tracks when they slipped and fell onto a live third rail and were electrocuted.
2 July 2014	United States	Electric shock	Died	42	Jason Wulf who was a graffiti artist died after he was electrocuted by the third rail inside of a Brooklyn subway tunnel.
25 September 2014	Germany	Collision with train	Died	64	Walter Josef Fischer was on train tracks when he was hit by a passing S-Bahn train. The cover of a power cable had newly sprayed graffiti on it, and a spray can was located close to him.
25 September 2014	Australia	Fall from moving train	Died	34	A person was killed after they had been riding on the outside of a moving train and attempting to spray graffiti on it when they fell from the train and was killed.
1 November 2014	Australia	Electric shock	Died	26	A person died when they were spraying graffiti on train carriages at a train depot and they climbed onto one of the carriages, raised their hand and was electrocuted by overhead power lines.
23 March 2015	Ukraine	Electric Shock	Died	15	A 15-year-old died when they were painting graffiti on the side of train carriages and they then climbed up onto the roof of a carriage for a photo and they then received an electric shock which set their clothing on fire.
7 December 2015	Portugal	Collision with train	Died	18, 20, ?	Three people died when they were attempting to graffiti a train and a passing train travelling at 120 km/h (75 mph) collided with them.
April 2016	Italy	Collision with train	Injured	21	A person received a fractured tibia and fibula in their right leg when they collided with a train. They were spraying graffiti on a wall beside railway tracks. They said that "A train has passed. We have seen it. ...we just had to cross two tracks. We haven't heard the other coming. It was behind us. It was raining".
20 May 2016	Germany	Collision with train	Died	29	A person was spraying graffiti on technical equipment near train tracks when a freight train passed them, and the force from the suction of the freight train threw them against the side of the train, killing them instantly.
3 October 2016	Germany	Collision with train	Died	18, 19	Two people were hit by a train and killed; a bag with spray utensils and spray paint cans were found nearby.
29 May 2017	Australia	Collision with train	Died	25	It was speculated that a person was spraying graffiti on a stationary train when they then ran across the tracks and was hit by a train. Spray paint cans were found close to their body.
30 August 2017	Greece	Electric shock	Died	19	A person was at a train station where they wrote their tag on a train carriage, and whilst talking on the phone, they tripped over onto a live third rail that electrocuted them. Paramedics took them to hospital where they were pronounced dead.
17 November 2017	Germany	Electric shock	Injured	26	A person was injured in a train marshalling yard; it was speculated that they were in the yard in relation to graffiti. They climbed on top of a stationary train carriage and received an electric shock, and were taken to hospital in a critical but stable condition.
2 January 2018	France	Electric shock	Injured	21	A person went into a train marshalling yard and it is speculated that they went there to create graffiti on a freight carriage. They climbed onto a carriage and received an electric shock from the overhead power lines. A person who was with him contacted emergency services, and he was transported to a hospital that specializes in treating burn patients, where he remained in critical condition.
January 2018	Portugal	Fall	Died	21	A person died when they were on the roof of a building intending to paint graffiti, and a skylight gave way under their weight and they fell seven metres (23 ft).
18 June 2018	United Kingdom	Collision with train	Died	19, 23, 23	Three people were killed when it is thought they saw an oncoming train and then hid behind a wall so that they would be hidden from sight. In doing this, they put themselves in the path of a train and were struck by one. Spray paint cans were in close proximity to where their bodies were found.
5 September 2018	Australia	Collision with train	Died	?	A person died when it is speculated that they were spraying a train with graffiti and they then moved backwards into the path of an oncoming train, and a collision occurred.
4 December 2018	United Kingdom	Electric shock	Died	29	A person was on railway lines and it is speculated that they were creating graffiti, and they were killed after receiving an electric shock from overhead power lines.
11 May 2019	Spain	Collision with car	Died	14	A teenager died after having painted graffiti next to a highway; they then travelled across two lanes of the highway and collided with a car.
15 November 2019	United States	Fall	Died	28	A 28-year-old had been attempting to spray paint graffiti on a building when they fell through a metal awning and was killed.
December 2019	Germany	Collision with train	Died	23	A person died after a passing train collided with them. It is speculated that they may not have heard the approaching train while spraying graffiti on a junction box.
18 July 2020	Greece	Electric shock	Died	20	A person died when they were going across train lines and they were electrocuted. It is speculated that they were crossing lines while looking to create graffiti.
7 January 2021	United States	Gunshot	Died	32	A special education teacher was shot and killed after trying to stop a teenager from spray-painting graffiti on an east valley business when the teen had a gun and pulled the trigger.
20 April 2022	United States	Collision with train	Died	28, 34	As a train operator was arriving at a train station they saw two people lying dead beside a railway track. A 28-year-old and a 34-year-old had collided with a train when they had been attempting to create graffiti. They had spray paint cans on them when the collision with the train occurred.
4 June 2022	United States	Gunshot by suspect	Died	18	An 18-year-old died when they were spray-painting graffiti in Azusa, then they were cornered by two suspects who allegedly shot and killed them.
9 December 2022	United States	Gunshot	Died	30s	A person in their 30s was spray-painting graffiti and tagging a wall at Joe Balderrama Park in Oceanside, when he was then shot and killed.
15 April 2023	United States	Gunshot	Died	69, 30	Two people were shot and killed by a 24-year-old after they were caught spray-painting graffiti over the 24-year-old's artwork.
16 April 2023	United States	Gunshot	Died	60	A 60-year-old died after being shot and killed by a 24-year-old after confessing that he was spray-painting graffiti over the gang's graffiti on the side of an ice cream shop.
30 July 2023	United States	Collision with monorail	Died	14	A 14-year-old died when they were spray-painting graffiti on the side of a building next to a monorail track when a passing monorail collided with them.
13 May 2024	United States	Gunshot	Died	14	A person was killed by a gunshot directly into the head in a park while spray painting over graffiti.
25 July 2024	United States	Gunshot	Died	30	A person who is named "Jose Luis Guitierrez Calles" was shot and killed over a graffiti beef in Seattle according to his ex-wife.
10 February 2025	United States	Gunshot	Died	30	A 30 year-old was shot and killed by a 43-year-old man and his 14-year-old son during an evening graffiti spree in Los Angeles.
2 April 2025	United States	Stabbed and killed	Died	17	Austin Metcalf and his twin brother, Hunter were caught spray-painting racist graffiti at a Frisco High School which also includes "kill all black people" and the N-word, which lead to Karmelo Anthony stabbing Austin, killing him.
28 August 2025	United States	Gunshot	Died	57	A 26-year-old was spraying graffiti, and a 57-year-old father began arguing with the graffiti artist. The artist pulled out a gun and shot the father of three kids. The father was pronounced dead and the graffiti artist was charged with murder.
6 December 2025	United States	Gunshot	Died	19	Alberto Arzola, a 19-year-old, was shot and killed by police after patrol stopped for a 14-year-old was spraying graffiti in residential area.
4 May 2026	United States	Gunshot	Injured	?	A person was shot 4 times by a gunman on a Monday evening while spray painting graffiti on a car.

== Gallery ==
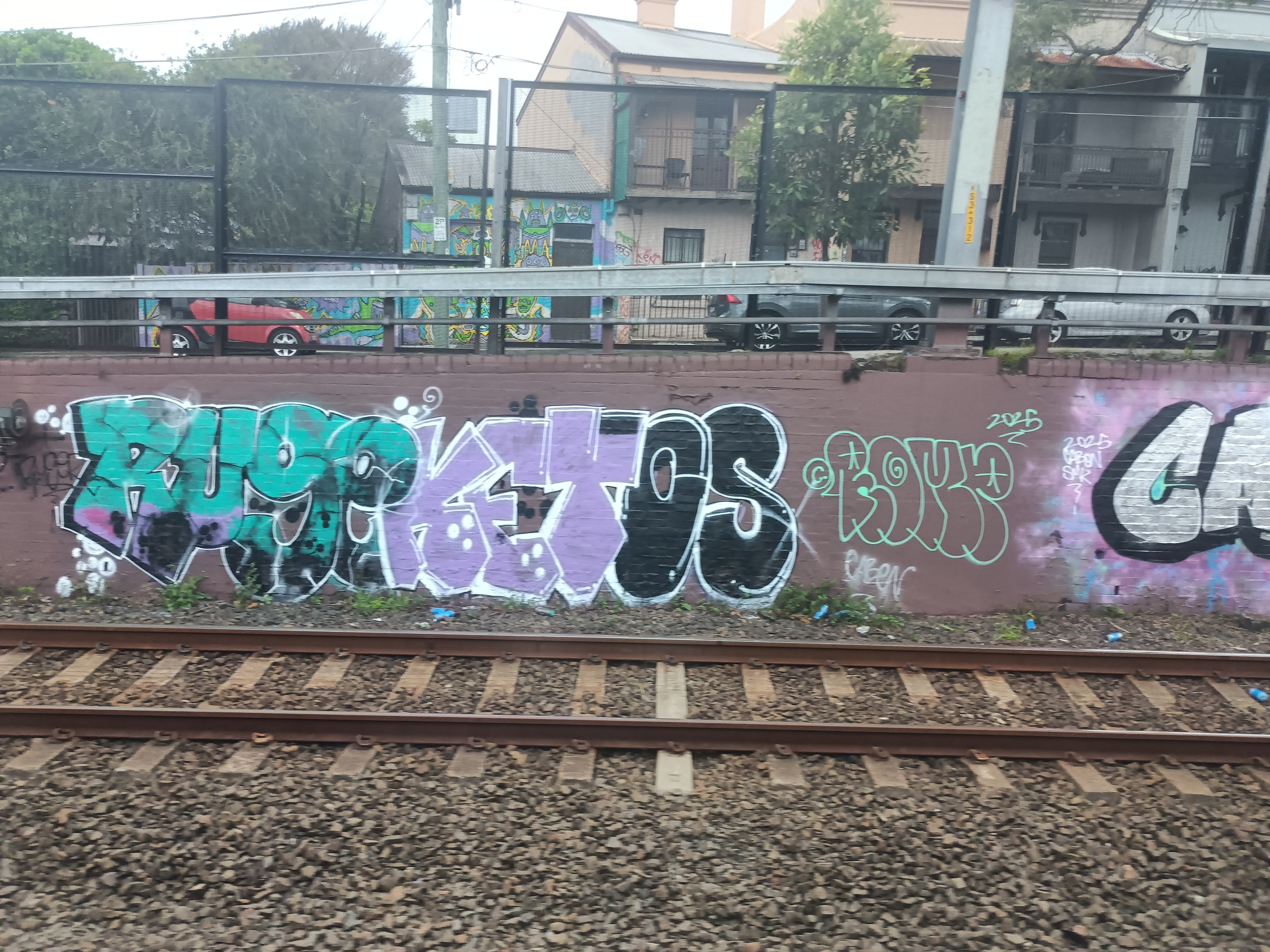
Spray paint cans alongside railway tracks in Sydney, 2025

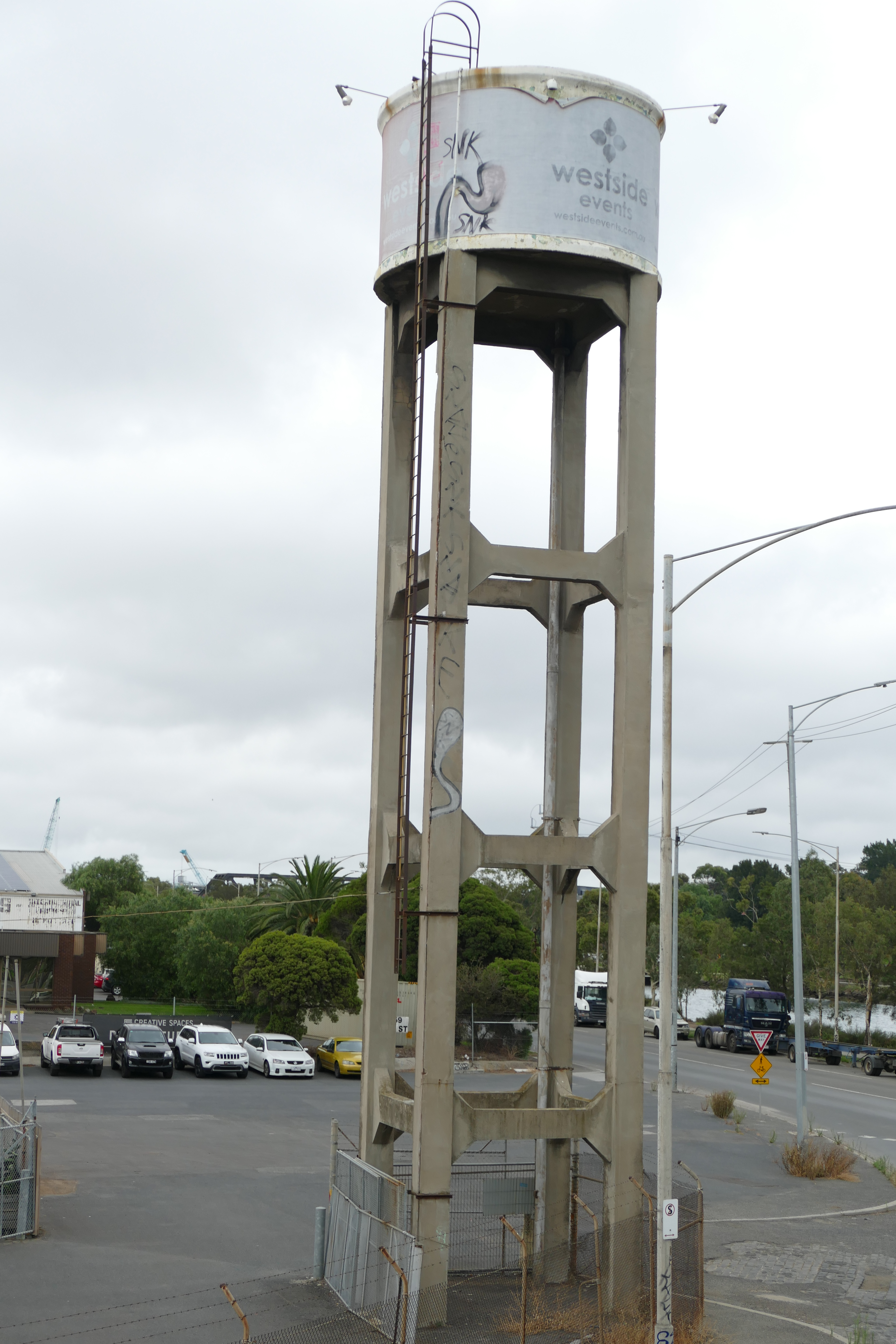
Graffiti on the side of a water tower. Melbourne, Australia. 2020

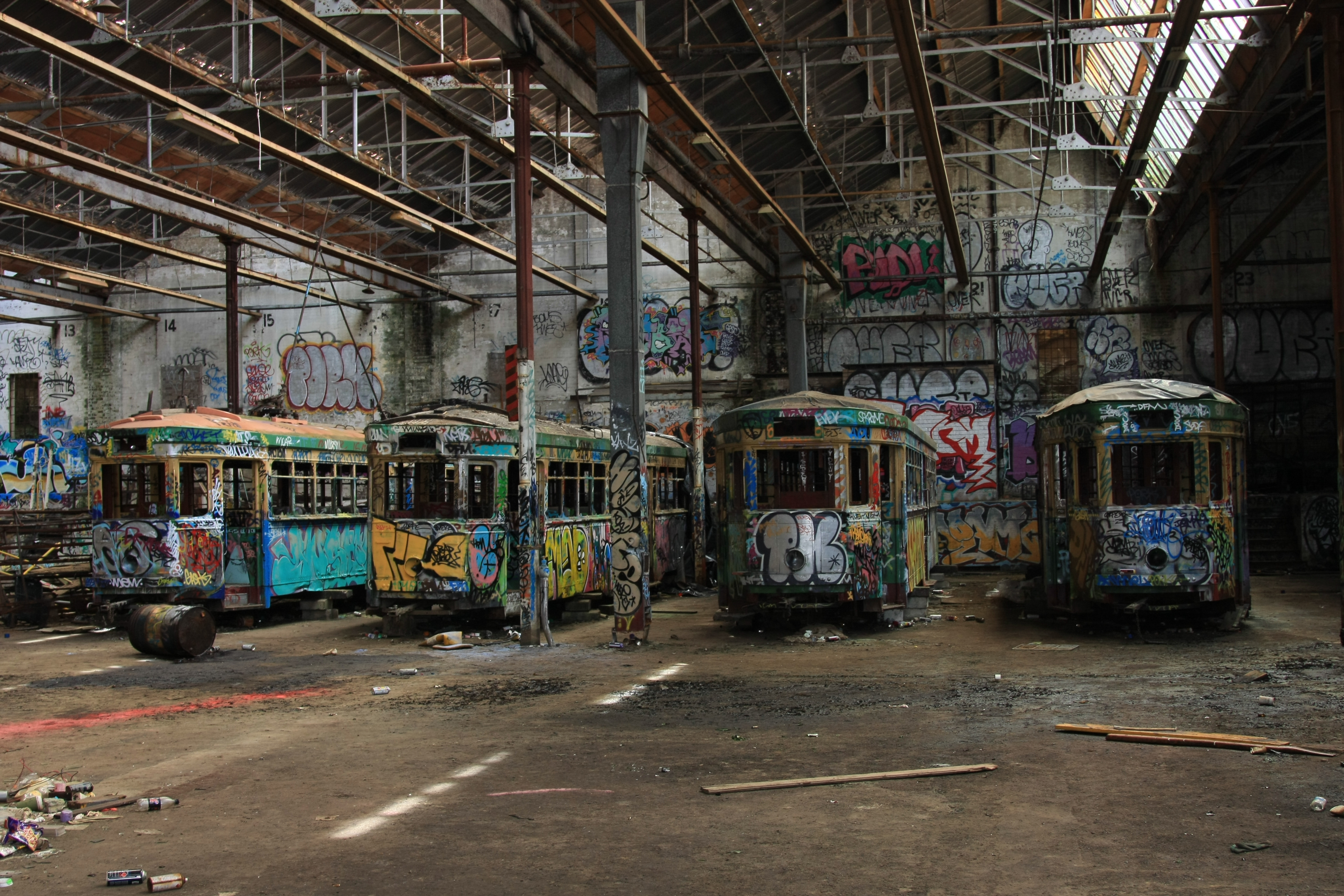
An abandoned tram depot in Sydney. Abandoned structures often have hazards such as unstable floors, roofs, walls and stray voltage. 2010

== See also ==
- Graffiti
- List of selfie-related injuries and deaths
- List of train-surfing injuries and deaths
- Rooftopping
- Street art
- Urban exploration
