= Metro Transit Assassins =

Graffiti street artist collective based in Los Angeles, California, US

MTA
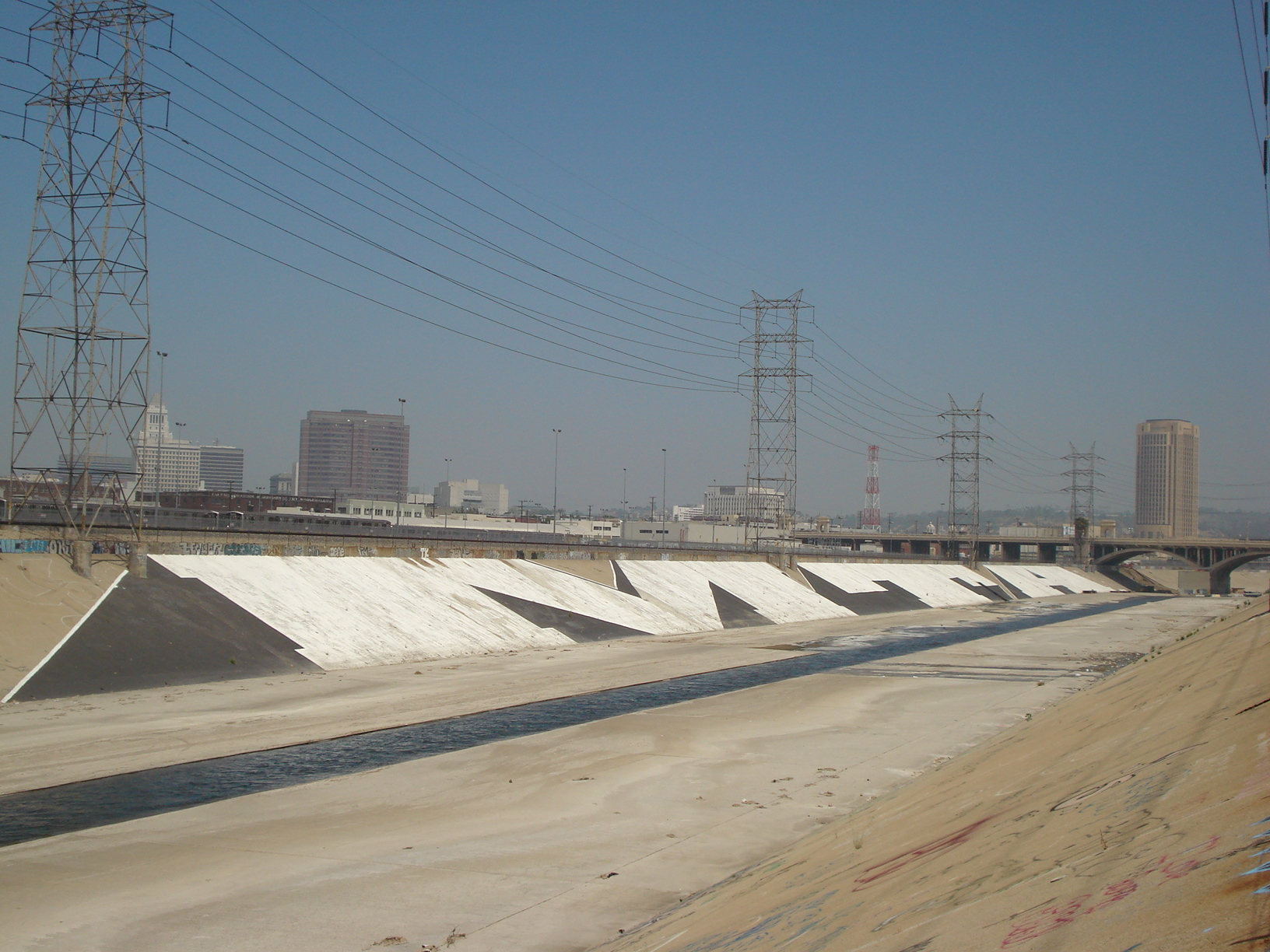
- MTA tag on the concretized banks of the Los Angeles River
- Known for: Producing what is considered to be the largest graffiti in history
- Notable work: MTA tag on the Los Angeles River
- Movement: Graffiti

Metro Transit Assassins, also known by the initialism MTA or as Melting Toys Away and Must Take All, is a graffiti street artist collective based in Los Angeles, most famous for its half-mile graffiti "MTA" tag along the concrete walls of the Los Angeles River.

== History ==
MTA was founded in the late 80s by Skate (1969–1993), who was already a founding member of another crew called California Bomb Squad (CBS). Other MTA original members were Skate's girlfriend Blosm, AZ, and Anger.

Over the years, many writers have joined the crew, including Swan, Demon, Gasoline (aka Gas aka Gaso), Sufer, Smear, K9er, Apear, Toro, Nomas, Ohjae, Ralos, Suem, Resek, Rakl, Rums, Wyde, Rose, Hapho, Zoner, Blisk, Abek, Fetish (aka Fem).

== Legal actions ==
In June 2010, the L.A. city attorney filed a civil lawsuit against 11 alleged members or alleged former members of the MTA crew. The suit had asked for $5,000,000 in restitution from the 11 defendants and was seeking a first-of-its-kind injunction against a graffiti crew, an injunction modeled on those made for violent street gangs.

On June 20, 2012, the civil case against 11 alleged members of the MTA crew named in the suit was settled with the 11 defendants no longer required to pay the city of Los Angeles millions of dollars for graffiti cleanup. The city agreed not to enforce the injunction against 8 of the defendants (Smear being one of those 8 defendants) as long as they refrain from any "graffiti vandalism" and complete certain requirements. Furthermore, the cases would be totally dismissed when the defendants pay outstanding fines, perform 100 hours of graffiti removal and five years pass without a graffiti conviction. Since Smear had paid all outstanding fines and 5 years since 2007 had passed without a graffiti conviction and he had finished the 100 hours of community service, the case against Smear was dismissed June 20, 2012.

== MTA Tag ==
The world famous MTA tag holds the Guinness World record for the largest graffiti tag in history measuring 57 feet high and 1,700 feet long, the tag took 300 gallons of white paint and 100 gallons of black paint. The U.S. Army Corps of Engineers was brought in to buff it in late 2009, spending $3.7 million to remove the tag.
