= Glass etching (graffiti) =

Method of creating graffiti using acid

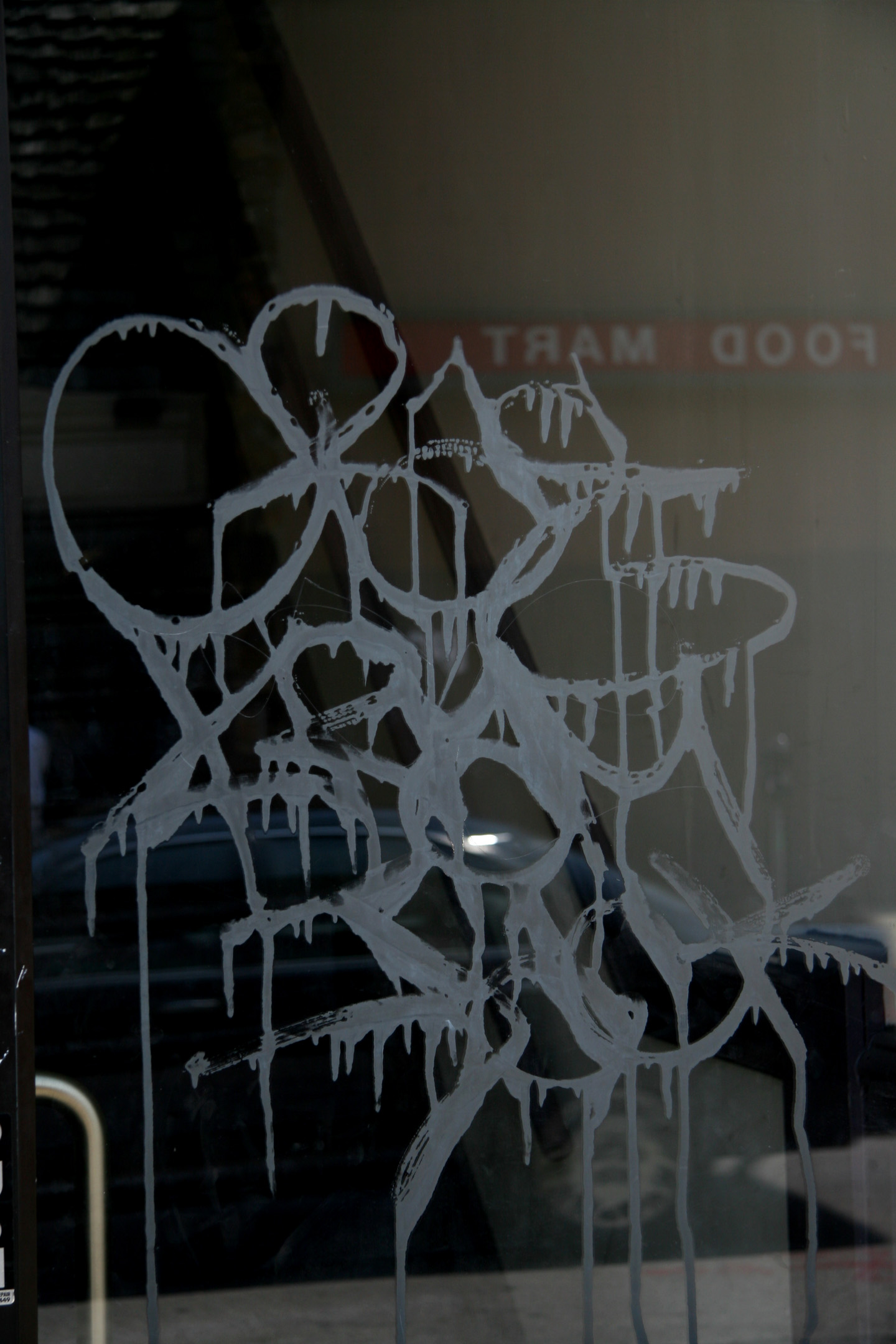
Tag created using glass etching.

Glass etching is a method of creating graffiti using a strong acid solution. Apart from the creation of decorative windows, the etching technique itself has also spread to the field of graffiti subculture mainly due to its permanence. Graffiti created in this way can only be removed by grinding the affected glass.

== Definition ==
Hydrofluoric acid is most often used to etch glass in a special marker equipped with a tip formed by a bed with a round footprint that runs down a vertical surface. The flow intensity can be influenced by pressing the marker. After applying the liquid to the glass surface, a permanent impression is formed, which cannot be removed by cleaning. Due to the handling of corrosive acid, this is a very dangerous process.

== History ==
The glass etching process was developed in Sweden in the 18th century, from where it spread to Europe and became popular in Victorian England. According to an article in the Los Angeles Times glass etching was first utilised as a method of creating graffiti by protesters during the Battle of Seattle. Within just a few years use of the technique then spread down the West Coast occurring in cities across California. Within a decade glass etched graffiti was reported to have spread across the country with graffiti artists in Jamaica Plain using etch products. In 2009 a bill put forward by Peter Vallone Jr., was passed by the New York City Council requiring shops to keep a record of a purchaser's personal details upon sale of acid used for glass etching, in an effort to combat its use for graffiti.

== Effects on health ==
Hydrofluoric acid is highly toxic and corrosive to all tissues including the skin, eyes and digestive system. It penetrates through the skin to the bones and causes their decalcification. It can cause death by skin contact, ingestion or inhalation of fumes.
