= Fukow =

Polish graffiti artist

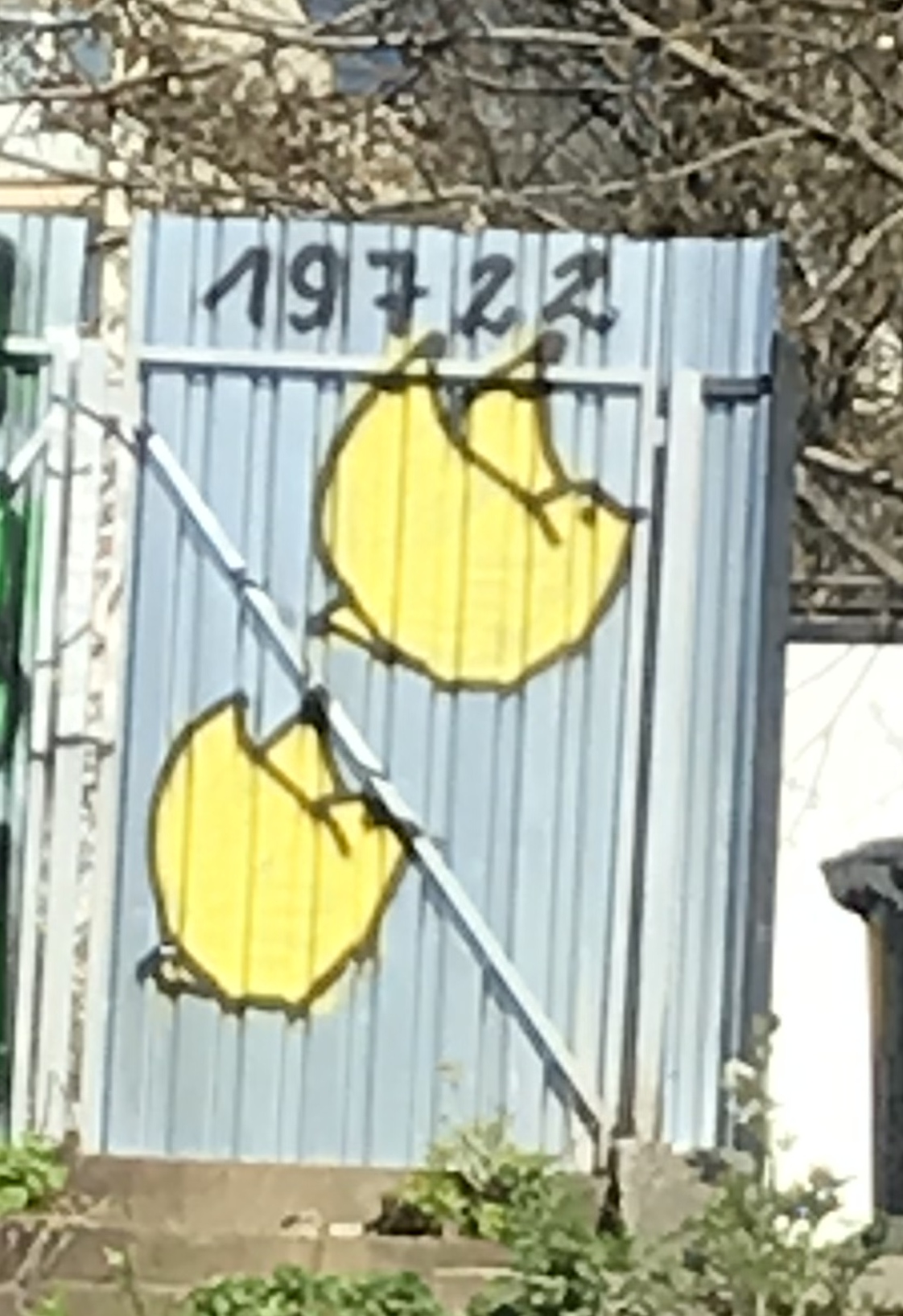
- Examples of Fukow's pigeon character at Ochota, 2025
- Died: 2023
- Known for: Stylised columbidae character
- Movement: Graffiti
- Website: fukow on Instagram

Fukow (died 2023) was the tag of an anonymous graffiti artist based in Żoliborz, Warsaw. They were known for their distinctive stylised pigeon character, examples of which were posthumously nominated for preservation in the artist's home district.

== Biography ==
=== Art ===
Fukow's work could be found across Warsaw including railway tracks along the length of the Warsaw Cross-City Line. In 2017 they took part in the Dzika grafika exhibition, curated by Tomasz Sikorski, which was held at the Poster Museum. Already a well-established graffiti artist, Fukow rose to particular prominence during the COVID-19 pandemic when they narrated their personal daily experience of the pandemic in the form of graffiti. Between September 2020 and December 2021, Fukow is reputed to have drawn their pigeon character on 10,000 goods wagons.

In 2023 Fukow began producing works in response to a medical diagnosis of a terminal illness, from which they reportedly died at the end of that year.

=== Legacy ===
Following the reported death of the artist, a local councillor in Żoliborz, put forward an interpellation that examples of Fukow's graffiti on a local cinema be preserved during renovation work. The specific work it was proposed to retain featured a yellow pigeon alongside the verse:

Original

I przegapisz wschód słońca,
jeżeli zamkniesz oczy.
A to złamie mi serce na pół.

Translation:
English translation

You will miss the sunrise,
if you close your eyes.
And that would break my heart in two.

The impact and ubiquity of Fukow's work has been compared to the Józef Tkaczuk phenomenon.

== Gallery ==
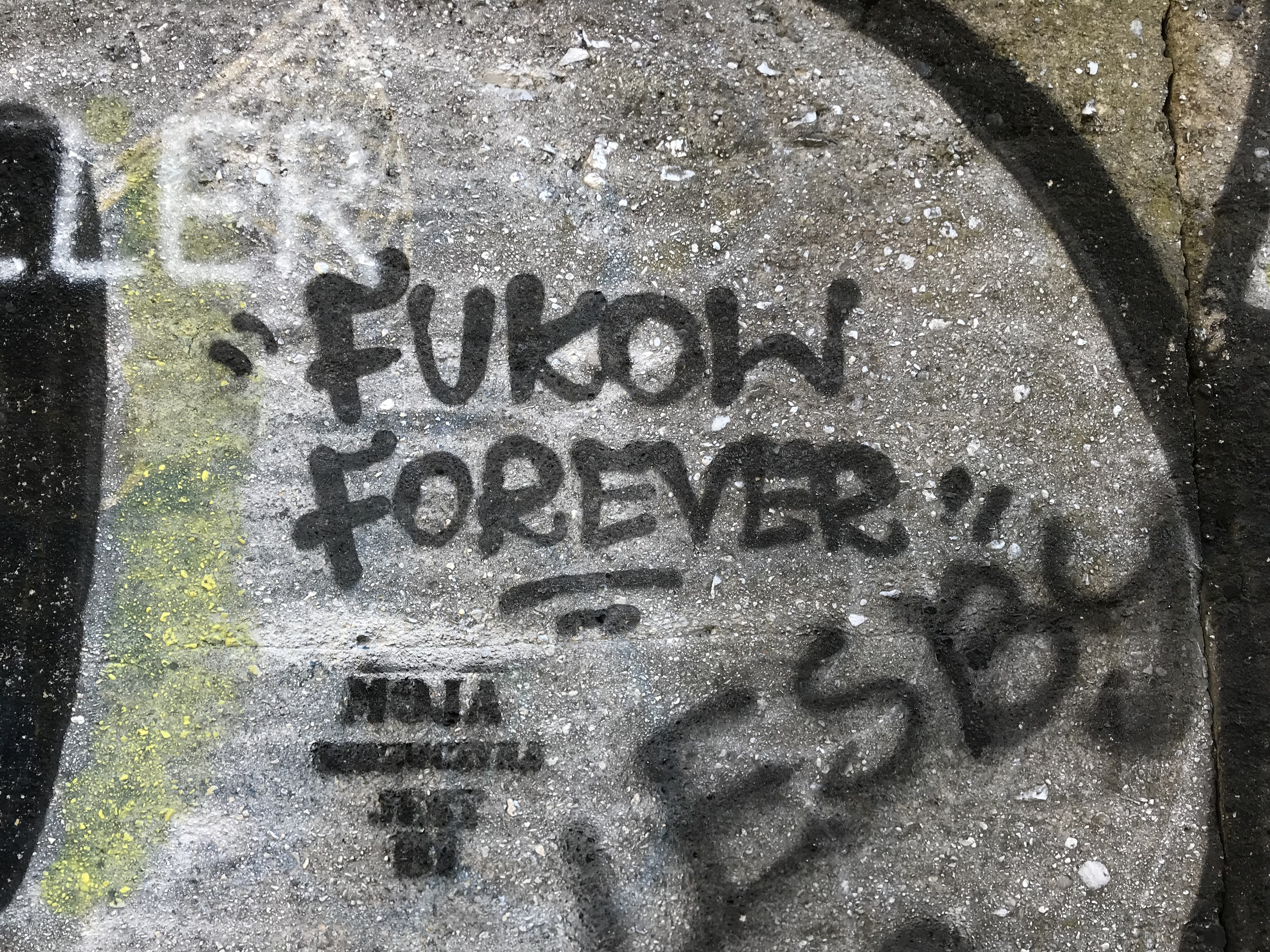
Tribute to Fukow on a wall in Powiśle, Warsaw

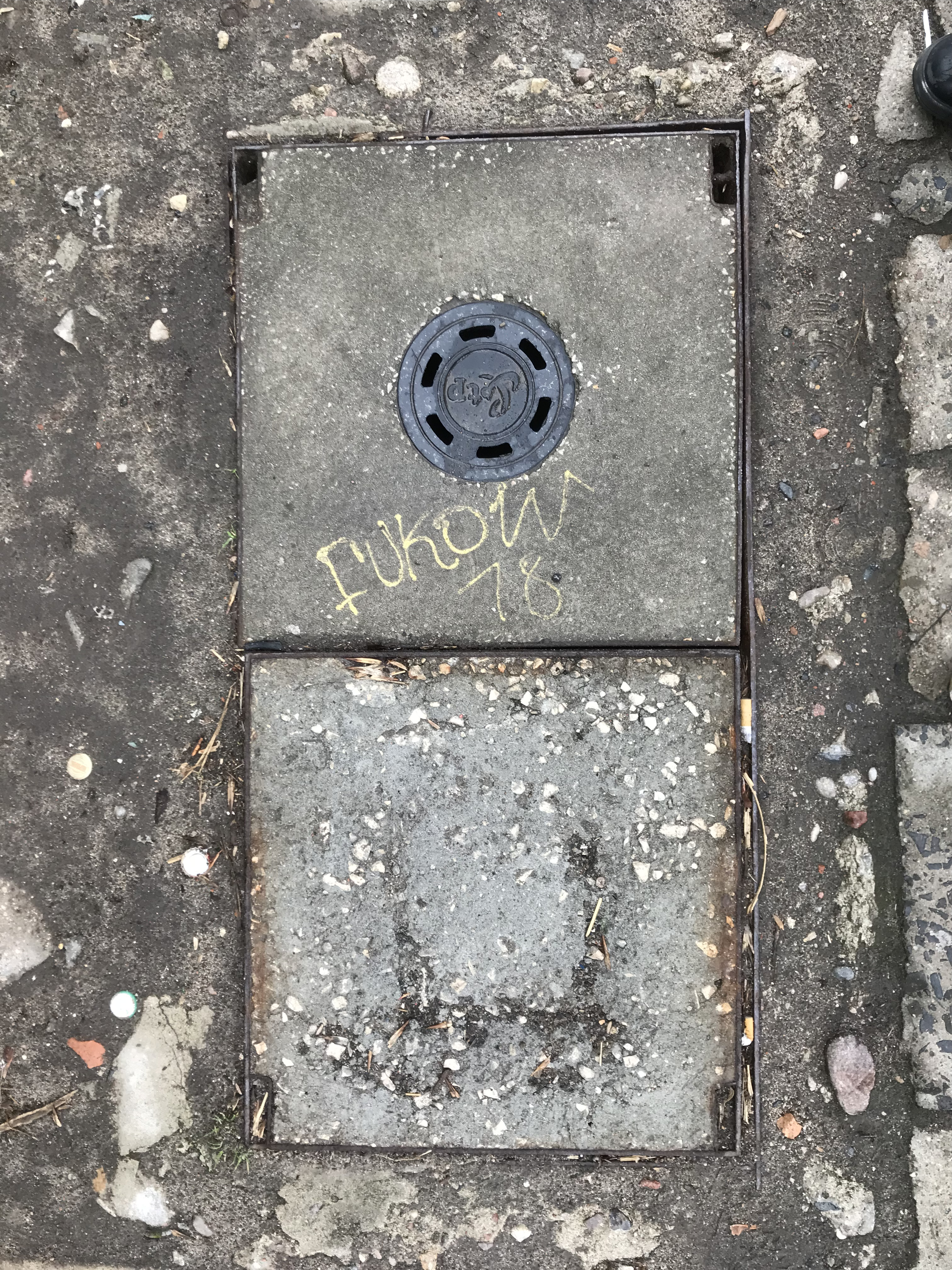
A Fukow 18 tag on a manhole cover in Mirów, Warsaw

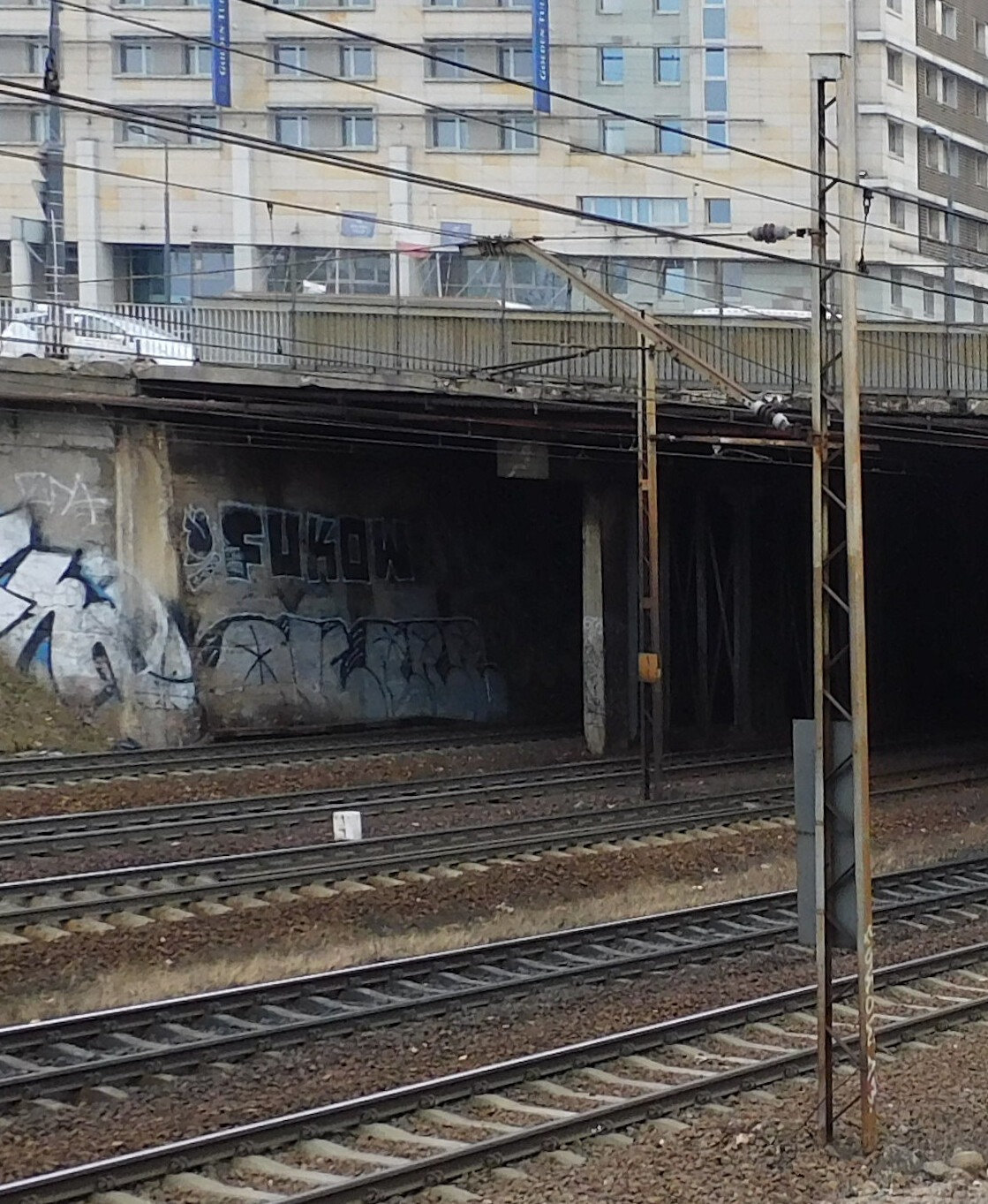
A black and chrome Fukow piece with pigeon character under a road bridge between Warsaw Ochota and Warsaw Main railway stations

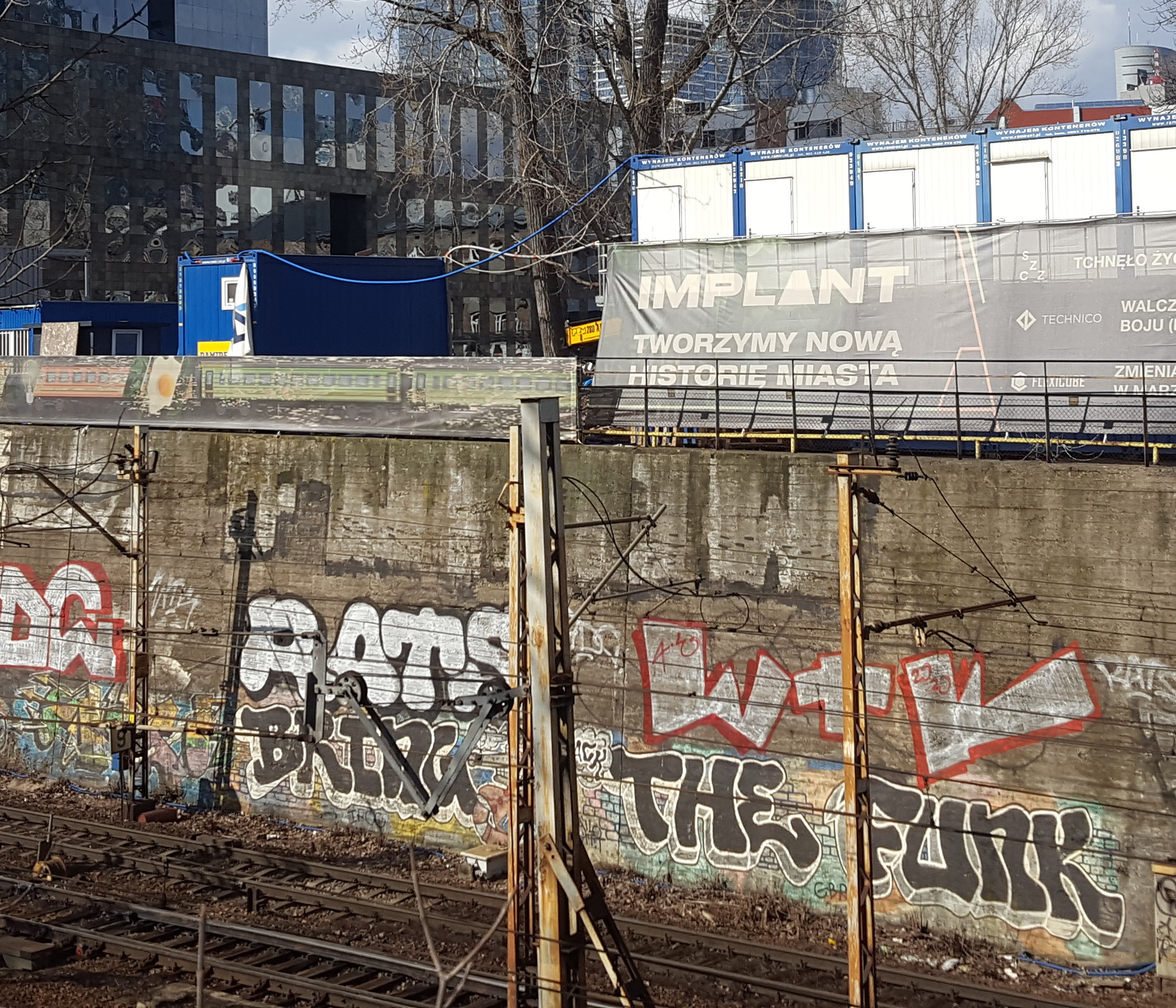
A faded Fukow roller piece above the Warsaw Cross-City Line

== See also ==
- Pam the Bird
