= Character (graffiti) =

Personas used in graffiti

Characters, or karaks, are an integral part of modern graffiti culture. Characters are "creatures or personas” that feature in graffiti works. They may be taken from popular culture (especially cartoons and comic books) or created by the writer as a signature character. Chararacters are found in almost all forms of graffiti, including ancient graffiti and the earliest forms of modern graffiti.

== Usage and form ==
While characters are found in all forms of graffiti, they are most common in stickers and pieces.

Signature characters function in the same way a writers chosen word or tag does. Characters may be as simple as a logo, and these forms are often done with stencils such as Blek Le Rat's rats. Some characters are more complicated, but they are still generally stylised, easily replicatable by the artist, and easily recognised by viewers as being the same character. This recognisability can allow characters to become informal mascots of their local area. Some artists make monikers out of characters from popular culture, but draw them in a unique style which still allow them to serve as a signature.

Some artists start off with characters or develop them in tandem with a word they write, such as someone who writes CROAK developing a frog character. Some graffiti characters evolve from drawing faces inside letters, which then develop into more complex characters. Characters may be used as substitutes for individual letters. There is usually a clear connection between a writers handstyle and the way they draw their character(s).

== History ==
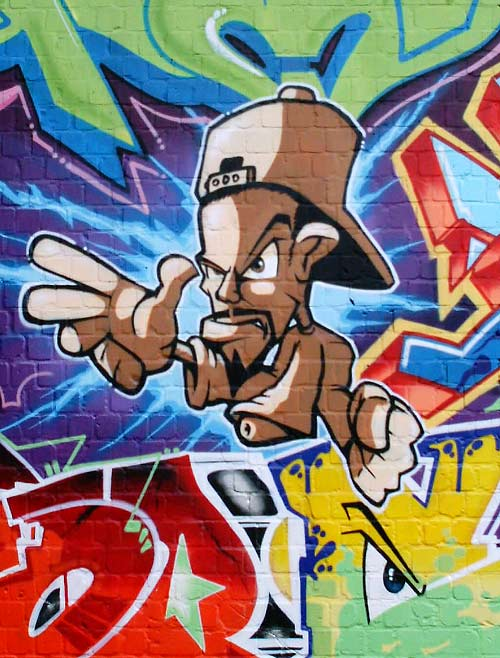
A classical style bboy character by CAN2. Münster. 2004

Early monikers on freight trains usually included characters, such as the cowboy character of Bozo Texino. The character Mr. Chad, as seen in the Kilroy was here meme, was drawn by multiple artists and originally designed by British cartoonist George Chatterton.

Cartoon and comic book characters were drawn in the earliest modern graffiti pieces on New York Subway. Characters by Vaughn Bodē, such a cheech wizard, were especially common. Bodēs characters are still popular with graffiti artists today considered a significant part of graffiti culture and history. Original characters in early modern graffiti were often b-boys, drawn to show the connection between graffiti and hip hop culture. They were often drawn breaking.

In 1984, Jace was one of the earliest writers to completely replace their tag with a character, called Gouzou. In the 1990s, Barcelonian writer PES replaces their tag with a fish logo. The street artist Invader began placing pixel art style mosaics in 1998 based on the computer games Space Invaders and Pac-Man.

== Notable signature characters ==
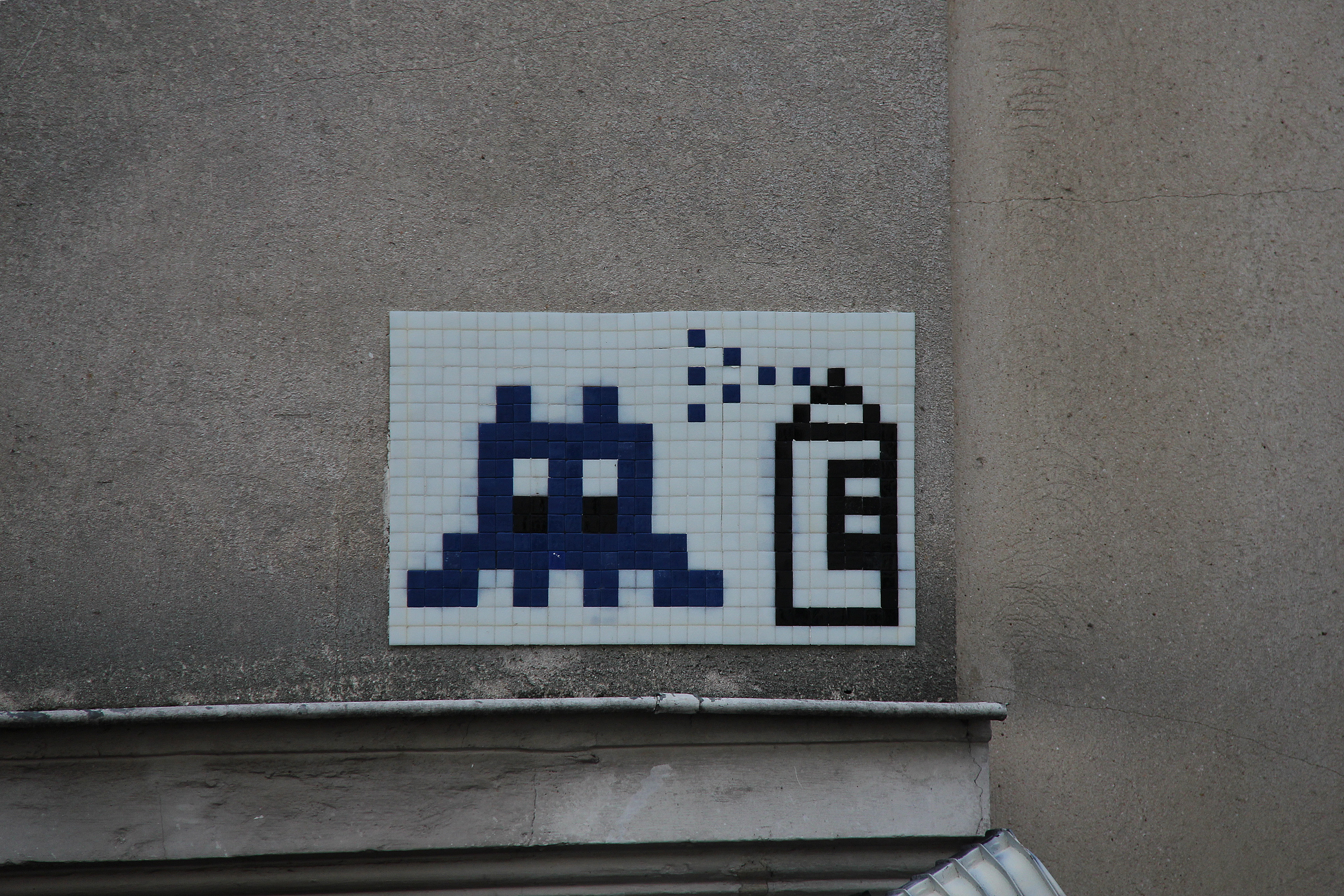
A character based on the computer game Space Invaders. A mosaic by Invader. Paris. 2010

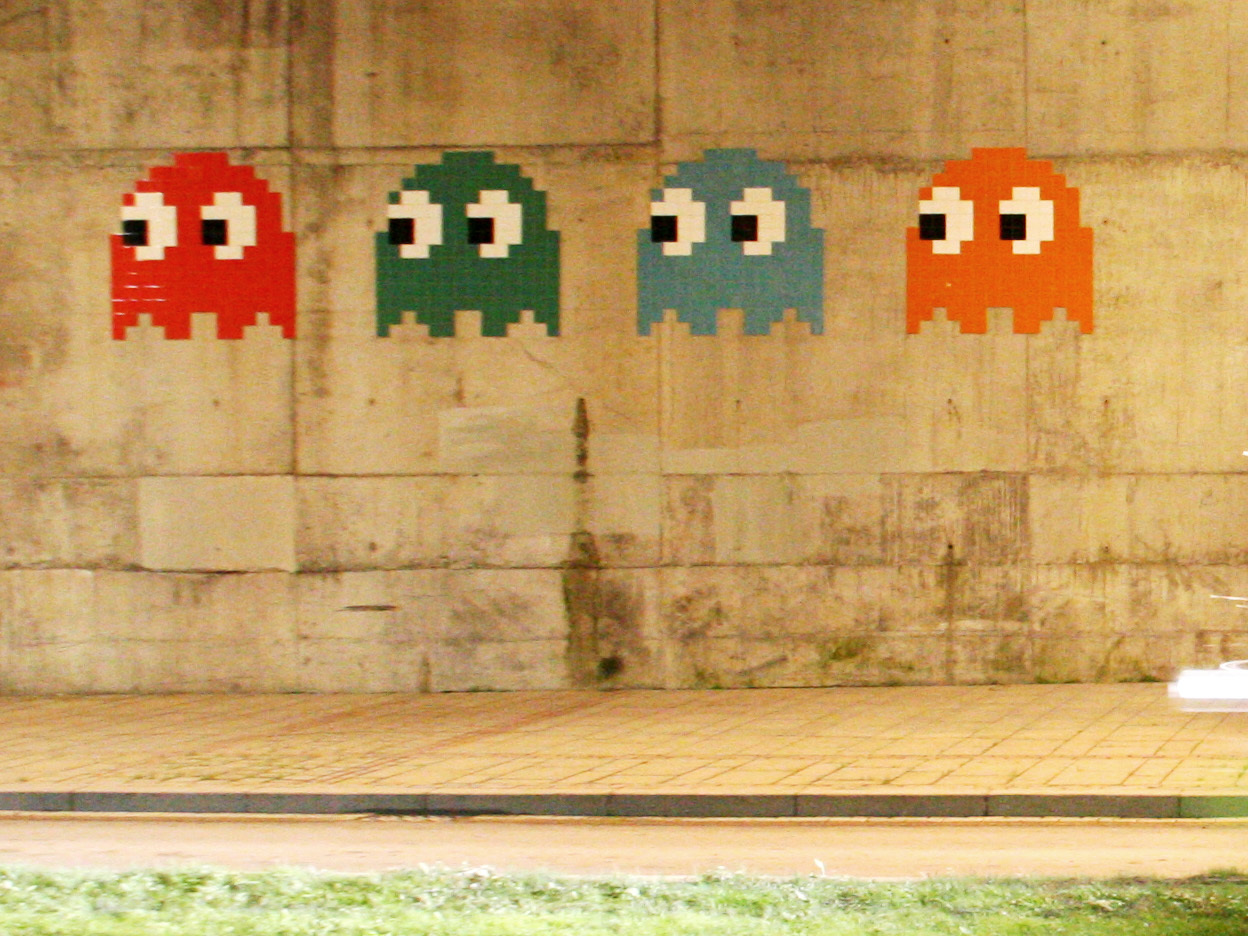
The ghosts from the computer game Pac-Man. A mosaic by Invader in Bilbao, Spain. 2008

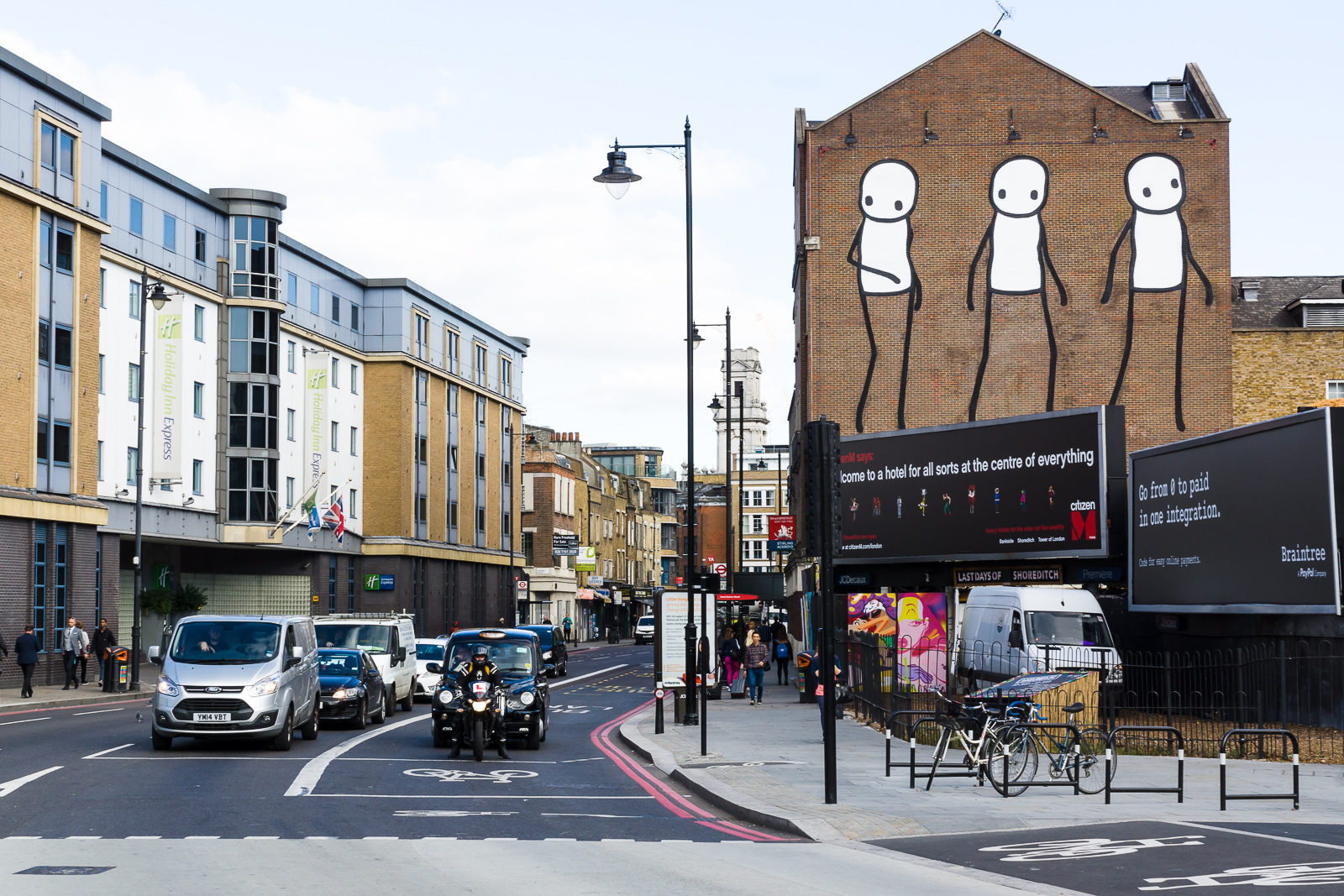
Characters by Stik in London. 2016

== See also ==
- Glossary of graffiti
