= Monsters of Art =

Danish graffiti crew

MOA
- Monsters of Art
- Mennesker Og Alkohol
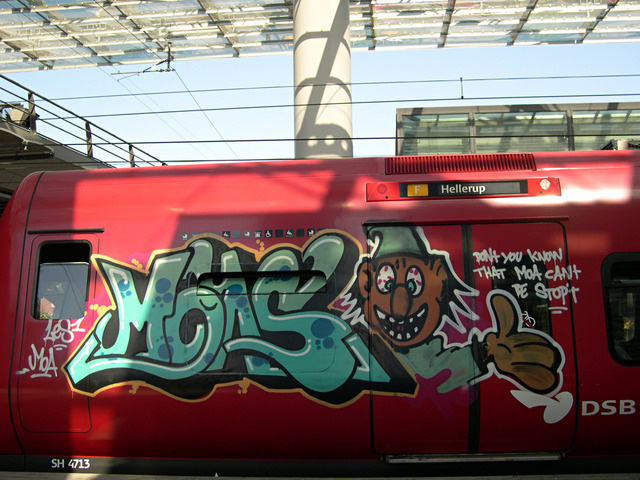
- A Litra SE train adorned with a MOAS piece on Copenhagen's F line
- Abbreviation: MOAS; MOAZ
- Merged into: VIM
- Established: March 1991; 35 years ago
- Founders: Fire; Fusk; Game; Mins
- Founded at: Vestegnen, Denmark
- Type: Graffiti crew
- Location: Copenhagen, Denmark
- Fields: Graffiti art
- Website: MOAS on Instagram
- Formerly called: COA

Monsters of Art, or MOA(S), is a Danish graffiti crew. The group was started by the Danish graffiti-artist Mins in 1991 when the original members were all teenagers.

They initially chose the name Mennesker Og Alkohol (transl. people and alcohol) before deciding on an English-name with which they could use the same acronym.

In 2001, a man accused of being crew founder Mins was arrested when caught painting illegally in Copenhagen. He later received a four month prison sentence, as there was insufficient proof that he was the person who wrote the tag Mins.
