= Throw up (graffiti) =

Form of graffiti

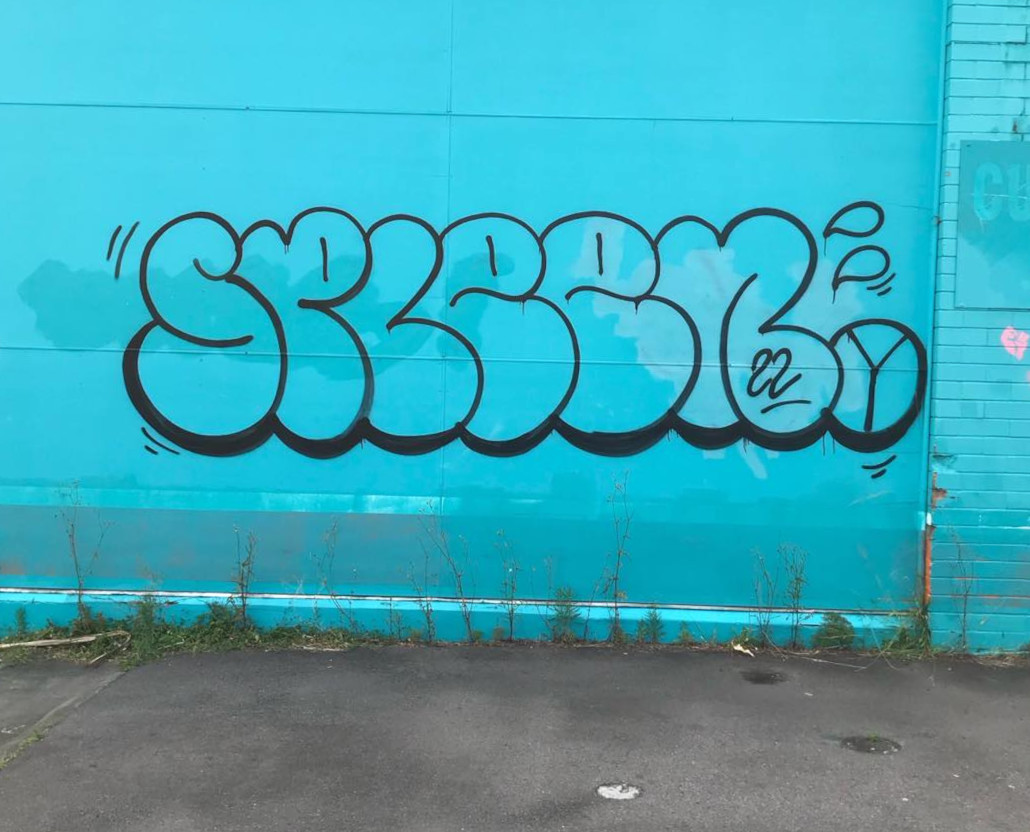
A hollow throw up using the letters SPLEEN.

Throw ups, (Note: sometimes written hyphenated (throw-ups) or without the space (throwups)) or throwies, are a form of graffiti that fall between tags and pieces in complexity. The name comes from the way they are designed to be "thrown" onto a surface as quickly as possible. They are almost always done with aerosol paint.

== Form ==
Throw ups are typically the writer's moniker in large "bubble-letters", with or without a fill. Throw ups without fills are called hollows. Throw ups are sometimes done using only the first two or three letters of the moniker in a throw up to quicken the process, especially if the writer uses a longer name. Throw ups are done with fast, pre-planned body movements to enhance speed. This speed means that writers can produce large amounts of throw ups in a short time, especially when compared with pieces.

Defining characteristics of skilled throw up include letter height consistency, letter shape conformity along the top and the bottom, minimal negative space, and clean lines. The line between pieces and throw ups is sometimes blurred, but throw ups tend to be faster to paint, have fewer colours, and prioritise speed over style.

== History ==
Throw ups originated in the New York City Subway in the 1970s and started as larger versions of tags before evolving into their own style. Compared to tags and pieces, throw ups have not changed as much since their origins.
