= BuZ blurr =

American artist, born 1943

buZ blurr
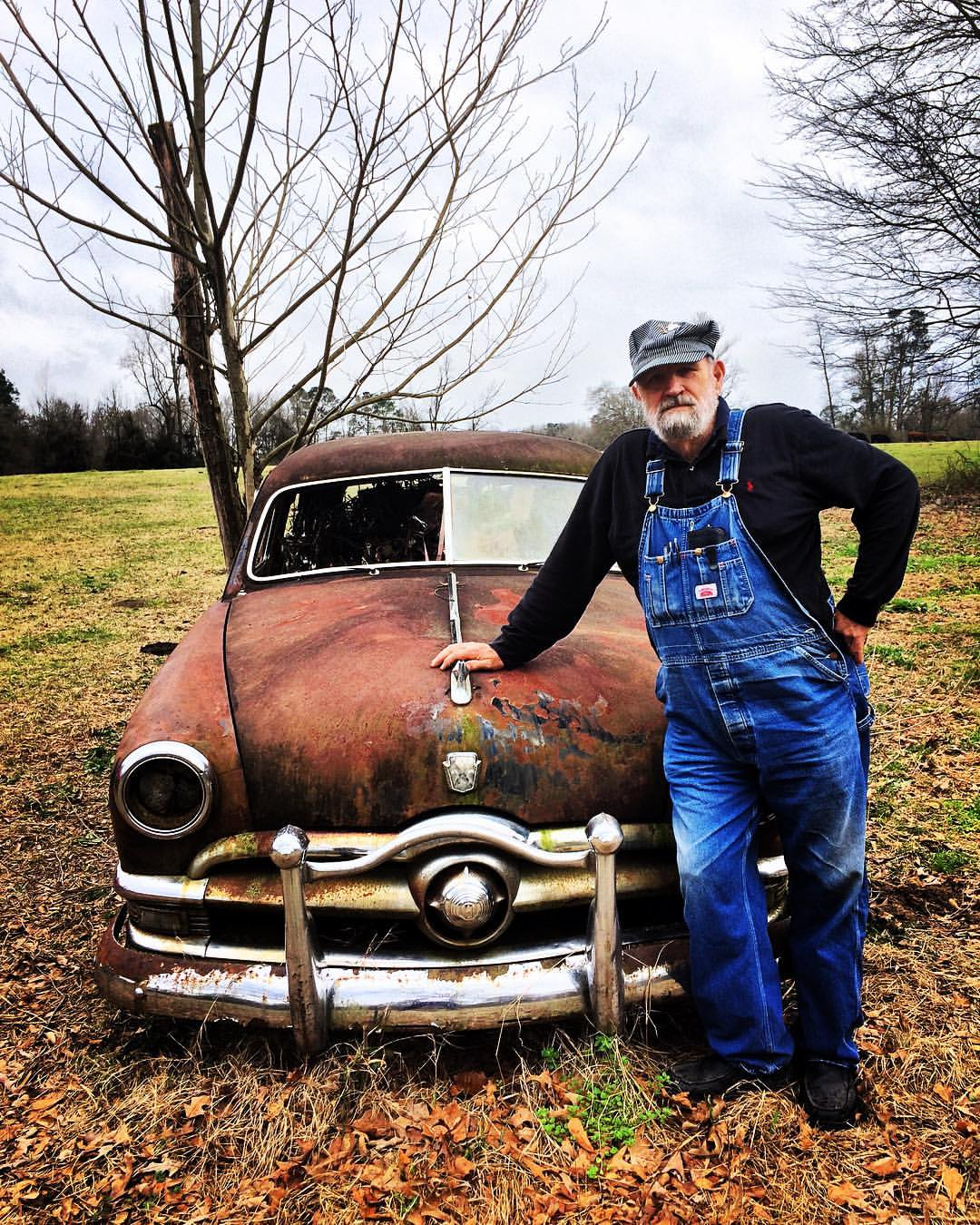
- buZ blurr in front of his 1950 Ford in 2017
- Born: Russell Butler; August 23, 1943; Lafe, Arkansas
- Died: January 26, 2024 (aged 80); Gurdon, Arkansas
- Other names: HooHoo Archives; Sweeney Todd; Gypsy Sphinx; Colossus of Roads
- Movement: Mail art, Boxcar art

Russell Butler (23 August 1943 – 26 January 2024), best known by the pseudonym buZ blurr, was an American artist and photographer primarily known for his contributions to the modern mail art network and for the boxcar art he produced under the monikers Gypsy Sphinx and Colossus of Roads.

Despite having lived his life in small towns in rural Arkansas, Butler connected with an international audience by documenting his life through mail art and boxcar graffiti, using the railroad and postage networks as systems of distribution and broadcasting.

== Early life and education ==
Russell Butler was born in Lafe, Arkansas, on August 23, 1943, to Cleda Elmira Mullins Butler, a restaurant manager in Forrest City, and Eugene Harvey Butler, a second-generation railroad worker.

As a teenager, Butler relocated often due to his father's assignments for the Missouri Pacific Railroad, first moving from Paragould, Arkansas to Earle, Arkansas, then to Palestine, Texas, Monroe, Louisiana, and finally to Gurdon, Arkansas, where he would remain for the rest of his life. In tenth grade, in order to see his girlfriend on weekends, he commuted between Palestine, Texas, and Earle, Arkansas on all-night passenger trains. There he read On the Road by Jack Kerouac, from which he would later repurpose prose for the captions of Colossus of Roads.

In 1961 he started attending Henderson State Teachers College (now Henderson State University), where he studied drawing, painting, printmaking, and ceramics, but he dropped out in 1964 to work full-time for the Missouri Pacific Railroad, where he continued to work for forty-one years, until retirement.

== Boxcar art ==
Inspired by J.H. McKinley's writings for the Missouri Pacific in-house publication, as well as hobo and tramp figures like J.B. King Esq. and A-No.1, Herby, and other notable boxcar artists, Butler marked a boxcar for the first time on November 11, 1971. He thought that specific day would be auspicious, being Kurt Vonnegut's birthday. Butler had been reading Vonnegut's novels and felt a kinship with his characters, especially those who "struggle with the absurdities and injustices of this world".

=== Gypsy Sphinx ===
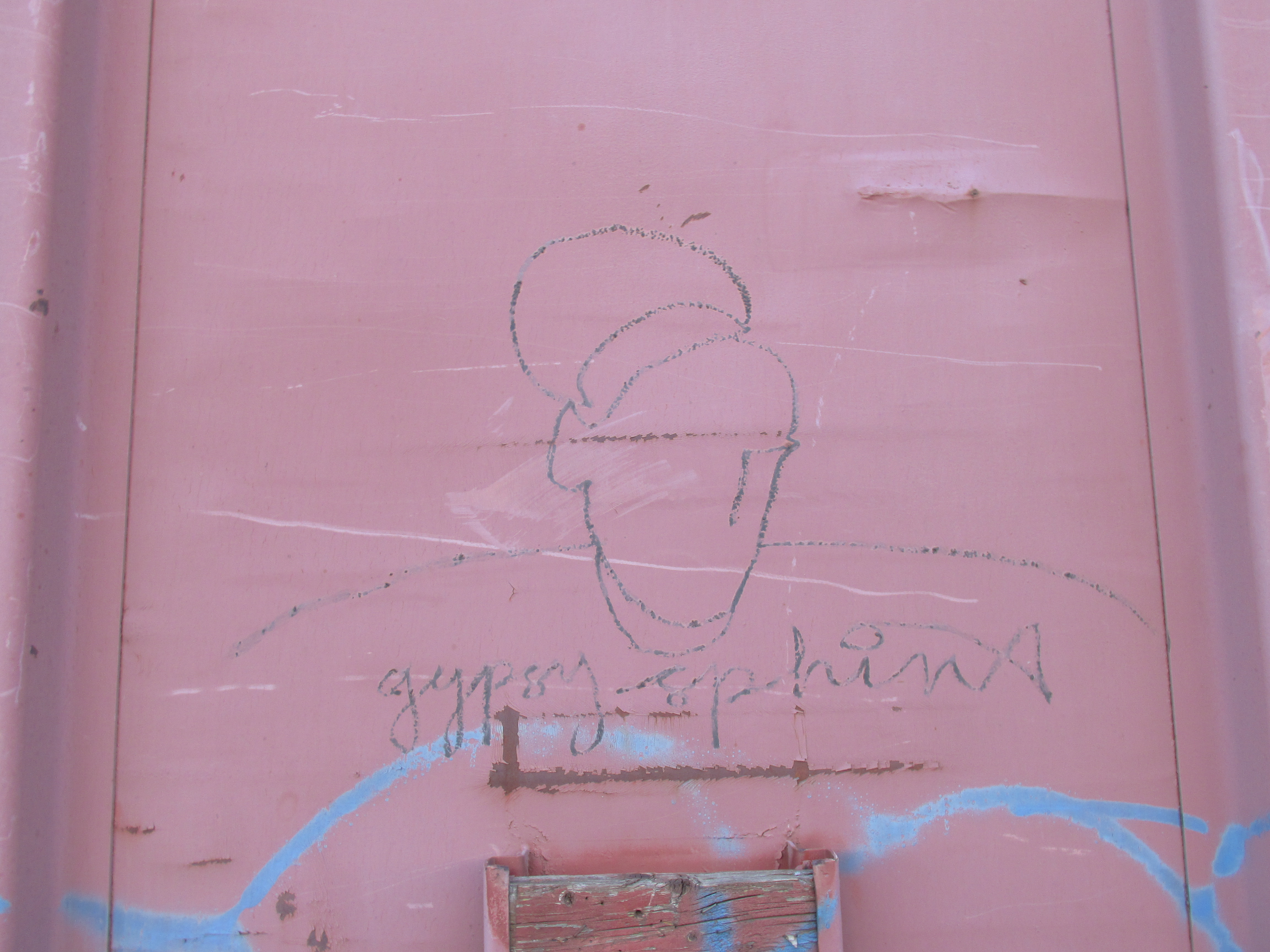
The moniker Gypsy Sphinx drawn on the side of a boxcar

The design of his first character was inspired by the figure of one of the coworkers who was most tolerant of his cartoons. Butler had been drawing cartoons about events of the railroad yard and, while those grew in popularity thanks to coworkers who Xeroxed them, the caricaturized subjects often regarded them as offensive, which eventually led Butler to stop producing this work.

The drawings were dated, and included a caption composed of three or four words of no apparent meaning. In reality, they helped Butler recall events in his life better than dates alone. The repeated use of cryptic captions would become one of his distinguishing features as a boxcar artist.

Eventually, Butler wanted to move on to a new character, but to give "a proper send off" to the first one, for a year he drew that character with only the caption "Gypsy Sphinx". This name caught on and has been used to identify the character since. The name reflected some of the character's features: "gypsy" because he was nomadic by virtue of constantly roaming on trains, and "sphinx" because he only spoke in cryptic sentences.

=== Colossus of Roads ===
The inspiration for his second character came from J.H. McKinley, the boxcar artist and fellow railroad worker behind the moniker Bozo Texino. The new character debuted in 1979 and, like Bozo Texino, consisted of a cowboy smoking a pipe. Butler's cowboy is viewed in profile, facing the direction of the train and leaving a trail of smoke behind, as if riding the boxcar. As with Gypsy Sphinx, Butler continued to use cryptic captions under his character.

Eventually Butler again wanted to move on to a different character, and once again for a year, Butler drew it using only one caption: "Colossus of Roads". While Colossus of Roads gained popularity, Butler never found a suitable icon for the third character, so he abandoned the project and went back to drawing Colossus of Roads with different cryptic captions.

Examples of Colossus of Roads with different captions.

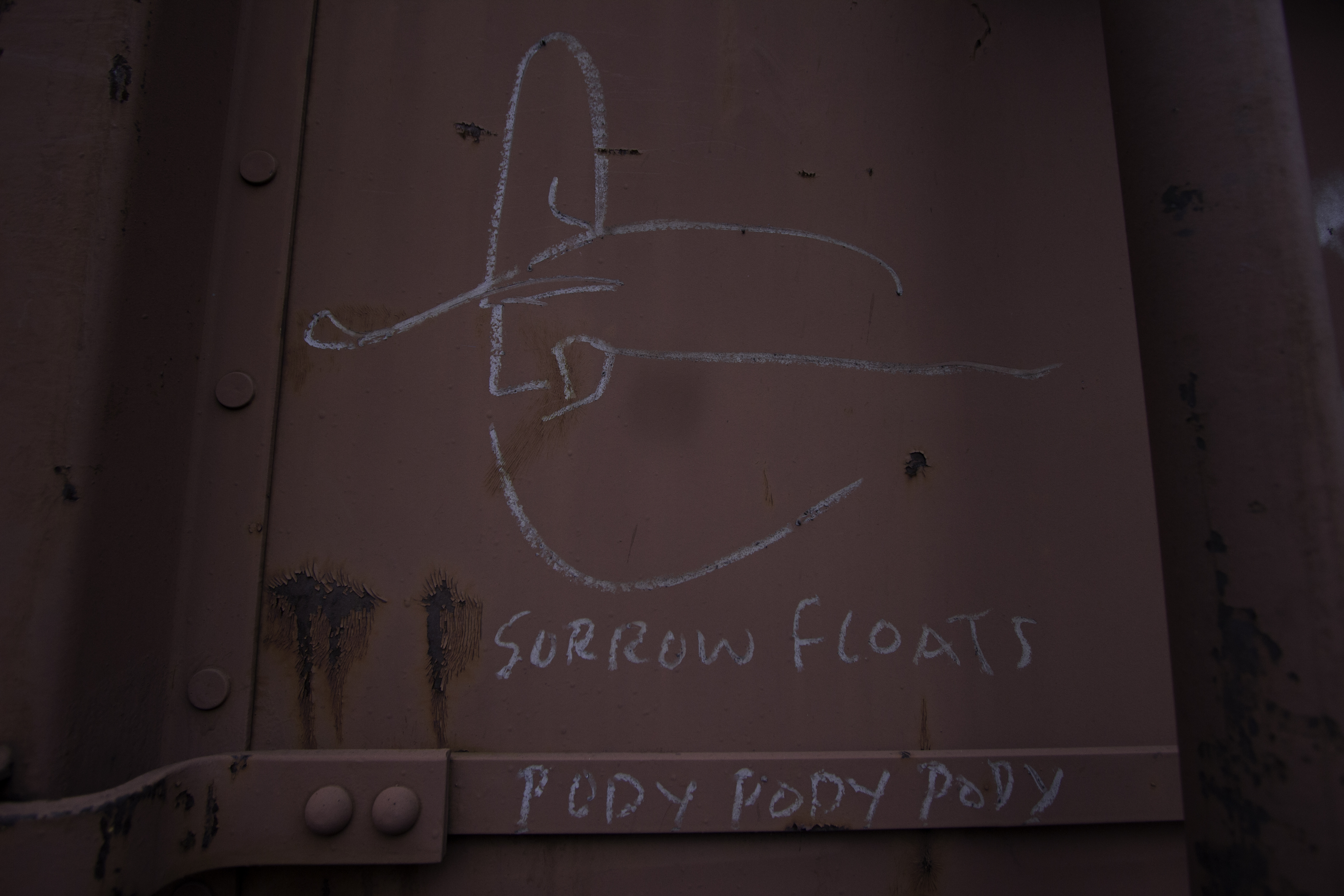
Sorrow floats

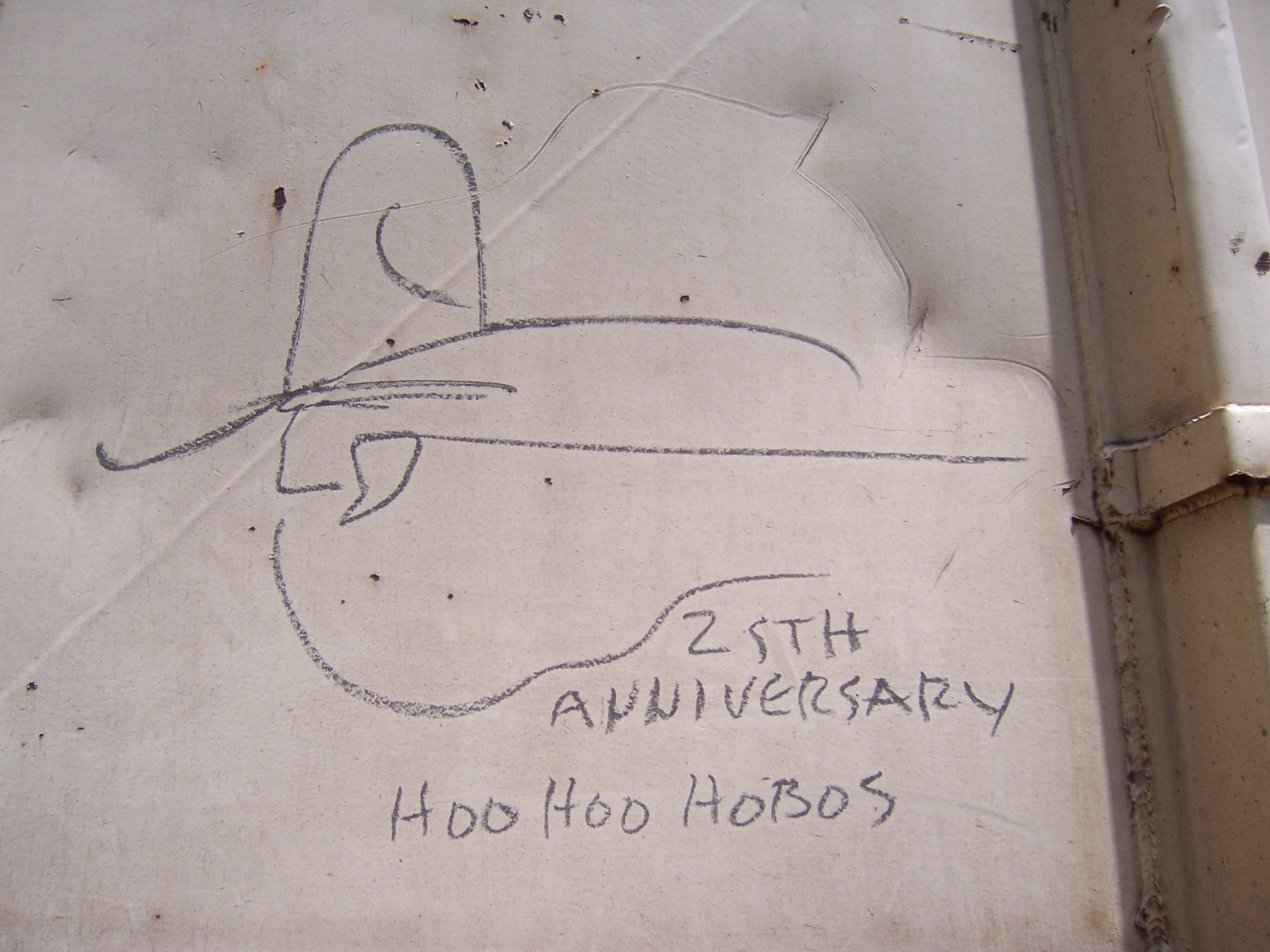
25th Anniversary: Hoo Hoo Hobos

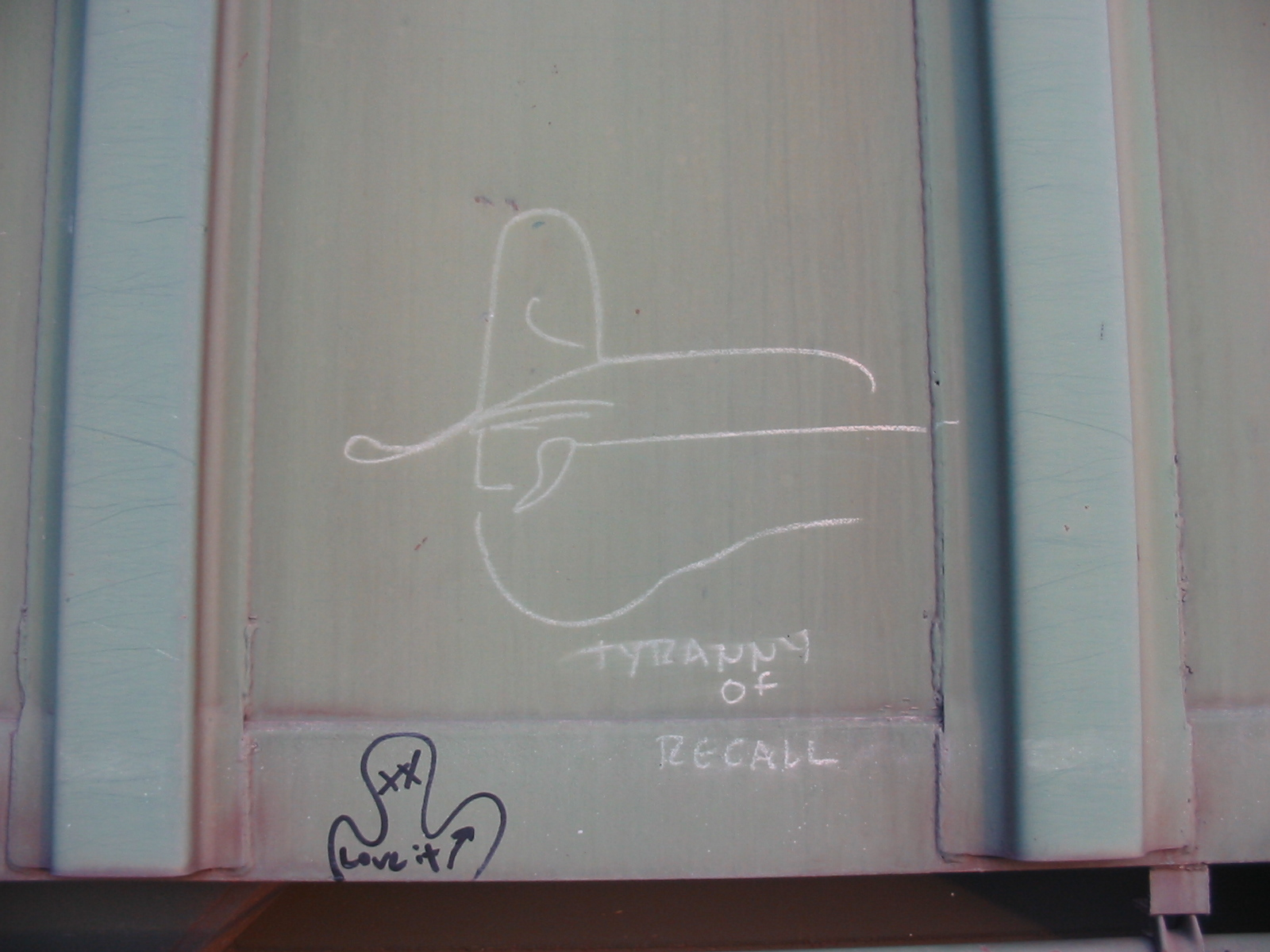
Tyranny of recall

== Mail art, documentation, and photography ==
In April 1972, Butler started producing mail art after reading about it in Rolling Stone magazine. He mailed the artists mentioned in the articles small artworks created on postcards that were included with The Rolling Stones' album Exile on Main St.. He later moved onto mailing artists listed on File Megazine, which showcased artwork from the mail art network and included a directory of participants.

For a while Butler assumed the alias Hoo-Hoo Archives, inspired by the local movie theater Hoo-Hoo Theatre. When he found out that the theater's name was derived from the Concatenated Order of Hoo-Hoo, which was still extant, he decided to stop using the name. After adopting other names like Sweeney Todd, he settled on buZ blurr, which represented boxcar icons who were like a "buzz word in current vogue going by in a blur". For this name he used a double letter "r" to be associated with the railroad, and didn't like the double "z" which he condensed in a singular capital "Z". Like other mail artists, Butler also uses pseudonyms for his location, like Surrealville and Principality of buZ.

=== Caustic Jelly Post Portraits ===
Encouraged by E.F. Higgins III, a mail artist he met during the Inter-Dada Festival in Ukiah, California, in 1982 Butler started creating his own artist stamp sheets. These were mostly made from xeroxed Caustic Jelly Post Portraits: portraits that Butler took with a Polaroid 3000, an instant camera that prints pictures covered in a negative image meant to be peeled off and discarded because considered caustic. Instead of disposing of the negative image, Butler carved it, creating stylized, high-contrast portraits of his subjects.

=== Documentation ===
Influenced by Guglielmo Achille Cavellini's Autostoricizzazione, most of Butler's work revolves around documenting his own life. The captions under his boxcar art were a way of documenting life events. Throughout his mail artist career, Butler traveled widely, documenting the many gatherings and exhibitions of the network through his artist stamp sheets and Caustic Jelly Portraits. Since he turned 36, Butler has been taking self-portraits on his birthday and working them into his art, often with self-deprecating captions like “glabrous pate acrophobic” and “lyssophobic underwater man.”

== Exhibitions, reception and impact ==
Butler remained anonymous for most of his career as a boxcar artist, while Colossus of Roads grew in fame. This situation made him "widely unknown", a tagline he adopted as a caption for Colossus of Roads and that was later used as the title of a group art exhibition in New York. For a time, the character was shown in training videos for new hires of the Union Pacific Railroad, to suggest the company was "the colossus of roads". Since then, Butler's work as Gypsy Sphinx and Colossus of Roads has appeared in nearly every zine, magazine, and movie on the subject of boxcar art. Bill Daniel, the filmmaker behind Who is Bozo Texino? regarded Butler as "The most poetic of the boxcar graffitiers", and it would be his film that ultimately outed Butler as Colossus of Roads.

Musicians Doug McCombs, Tim Barry, Hurray for the Riff Raff, and Dylan Golden Aycock have named songs after Colossus of Roads and its captions.

As a contributor of the mail art network for over fifty years, Butler gained international renown both for his body of work and for his effort to document the gatherings of the network. Mail artists John Held Jr. and Anna Banana described him as an unassuming person, whose work has benefited everyone in the mail art network.

Butler's work has appeared in many group art exhibitions of mail art and stamp sheets. His solo exhibitions include: Caustic Jelly Portraits at the Stamp Art Gallery in San Francisco (1997); Pretty Ugly White Black Blues Again at the International Curatorial Space in New York (2003) and the Arts Center of the Ozarks in Springdale, Arkansas (2003); and Wait of World: buZ blurr Age Progression at the CALS gallery in Little Rock, Arkansas (2019).

In March 2024, two months after Butler's death, STRAAT Museum in Amsterdam held the exhibition Moniker: An Origin Story, spotlighting iconic moniker artists with a special focus on Butler's work and his friendship with Bill Daniel.

== Personal life ==
From 1959 until his death in 2024, Butler lived in Gurdon, Arkansas, with his wife Emmy S. Blanton (known as Earlene in the mail art network). Together, they had three children.
