= Marmaduke High School =

Location
- 1010 Greyhound Drive; Marmaduke, Arkansas 72443; United States; 36°11′35″N 90°23′40″W

Information
- Status: Open
- School district: Marmaduke School District
- NCES District ID: 05000160
- Oversight: Arkansas Department of Education (ADE)
- CEEB code: 041575
- NCES School ID: 050001600691
- Principal: Shane Jordan
- Teaching staff: 67.37 (on FTE basis)
- Grades: 7–12
- Enrollment: 281 (2023-2024)
- Student to teacher ratio: 4.17
- Education system: ADE Smart Core curriculum
- Classes offered: Regular, Advanced Placement, Concurrent Credit via Black River Technical College
- Campus type: Rural
- Colors: Red and white
- Athletics conference: 2A Region 3 (2012–14)
- Mascot: Greyhound
- Team name: Marmaduke Greyhounds
- Accreditation: AdvancED (1990-)
- Affiliation: Arkansas Activities Association (AAA)
- Website: www.marmadukeschool.com/o/mhs

Marmaduke High School is a comprehensive public high school located in Marmaduke, Arkansas, United States. It is one of three public high schools in Greene County, Arkansas and is the sole high school managed by the Marmaduke School District.

== Academics ==
The assumed course of study at Marmaduke is the Smart Core curriculum developed by the Arkansas Department of Education. Students are engaged in regular and Advanced Placement (AP) coursework and exams prior to graduation, with the opportunity for qualified students to be named honor graduates based on grade point average and additional coursework above minimum requirements. The school has been accredited by AdvancED since 1990.

== Athletics ==
The Marmaduke High School mascot is the Greyhound and the school colors and red and white.

For 2012–14, the Marmaduke Greyhounds participate in the 2A 3 Conference administered by the Arkansas Activities Association. The Greyhounds compete in interscholastic competition including golf (boys/girls), basketball (boys/girls), cheer, baseball, softball, and track and field (boys/girls).

The boys basketball team are 3-time state basketball champions (1958, 1978, 1979). The girls basketball team was a 2A classification state championship finalist in 2013; the team lost to Norphlet 44–41. In 2015 the Lady Greyhounds won the 2A state championship.

Former student Amy Dixon (1995–98) was selected to 5 "All-State" teams (3 softball, 2 basketball), tied for 4th highest in state history.
