= Handstyle =

In graffiti culture, the unique handwriting of an artist

Handstyle or hand style is a term in graffiti culture denoting the unique handwriting or signature/tag of an artist, also known as a writer. The same way that in typography there are different typefaces or fonts, in graffiti there are different handstyles. Similarly to the way a typographer would focus on typefaces, point sizes, line lengths, line-spacing (leading), and letter-spacing (tracking), a writer would focus on line lengths, line direction, line curvature, letter size and letter balance.

The concept of having unique and expressive handstyles developed slowly. When graffiti first started in the '70s, a tag's style was the writer's personal handwriting. In New York and Philadelphia in the mid '70s, different writers and crews started stylizing and personalizing their tags. Over time, the concept of a handstyle emerged through the stylising of these tags. Today specific handstyles are associated to specific writers, crews, gangs, and even cities, such as the Philly Handstyle.

Handstyles can be used as the basis for evaluation. Writers are usually perceived as having "good" or "bad" handstyles by those in the graffiti community. Good handstyle is usually associated with style, consistency(uniformity), flow, and balance while bad handsyles are associated with sloppy letters, bad form and lack of style.

== Regional handstyles ==
Handstyles are usually unique to a writer or a crew but they can also be regional or shared between several writers. For example, in the '70s and '80s, the cities of Philadelphia and Chicago had distinct handstyles. Other regional handstyles include Pichação, Cholo, and bus flow handstyles.

In Philadelphia, the Philly Handstyle is still very prominent. Almost all local handstyles are somewhat influenced by the Philly Handstyle. What makes this handstyle unique is that the letters are stretched out vertically and the tag is usually painted in very few if not one line. This usually gives a sharp and energetic aesthetic almost looking like cursive letters. Philly letters are usually difficult to read for those outside the graffiti community due to this abstraction and stylisation of the letters.

Pichação is a handstyle developed in São Paulo. This handstyle is distinctively cryptic and has a dark aesthetic. The letters are usually painted vertically, while free climbing or rappeling off buildings. The result of this is long horizontal hieroglyphic/cryptic tags. In São Paulo all writers are influenced by Pichação even if they do not use this style and it can be seen all around the major cities of Brazil. This style has also spread to Europe, specifically Germany where the Berlin Kidz, have added their own style to it.

Cholo Handstyle descended from gang writing in Chicano neighborhoods in the '60s and '70s, and even hand-painted gang lettering in the '40s, is a prominent handstyle in Los Angeles. The handstyle can be described as "elegant, single-line scripts." The style has been popularized by writers such as Chaz Bjorquez, CRYPTIK, DEFER, SLEEPS, PRIME. The L.A. handstyle has reached global significance, especially within the art world through galleries, exhibitions, and collections.

Busflow originated in the San Francisco Bay Area. Writers would take the bus and try to tag in one continuous flow along with the movements of the ride, hence the name. Characteristics of Busflow include a rounded typography, connected (often through one-line) and generally equal-sized letters, and often loops in letters like K, M, or R. ORFN helped to popularize the style.

== Gallery ==
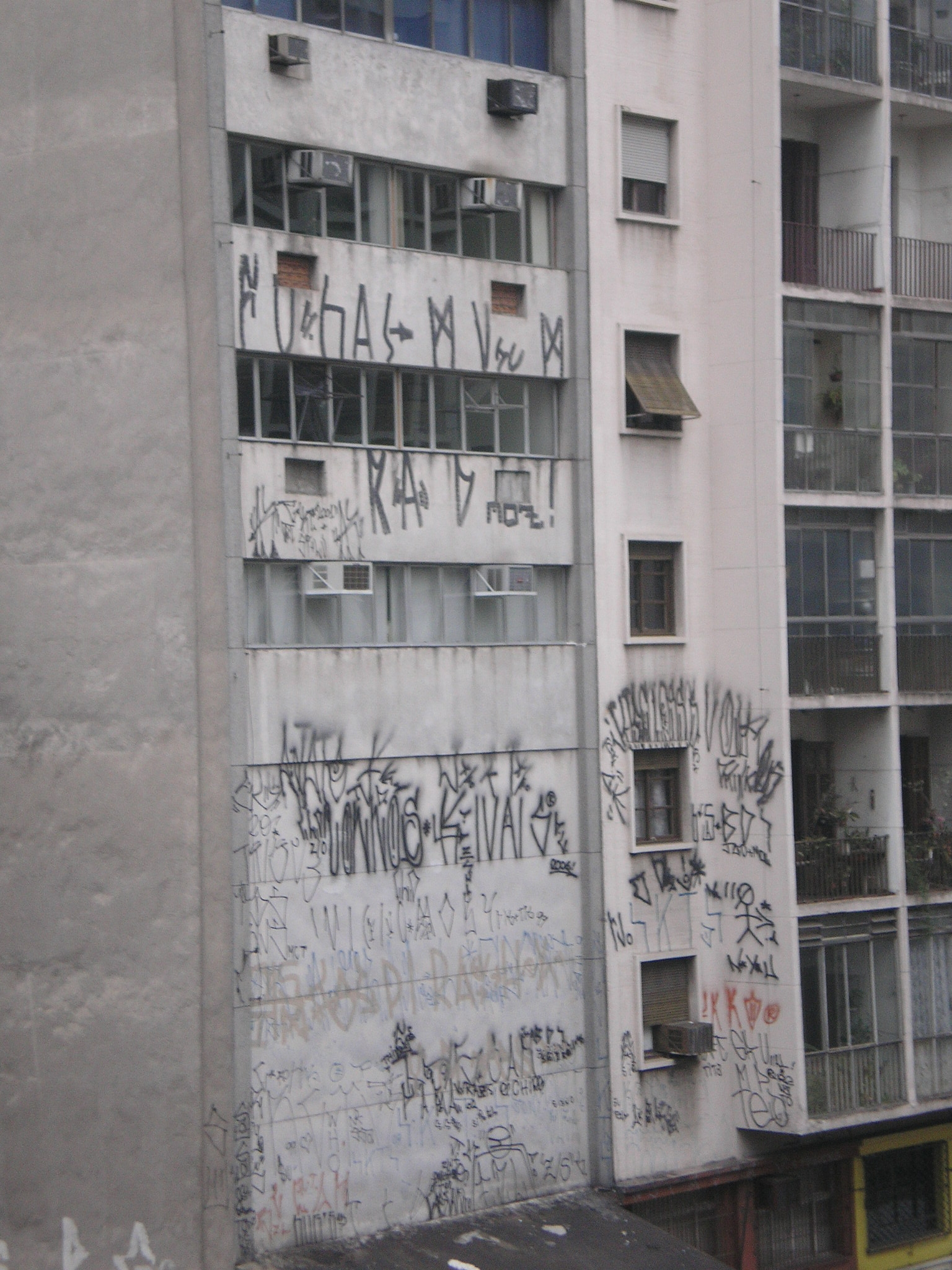
Example of Pichação from São Paulo, Brazil.

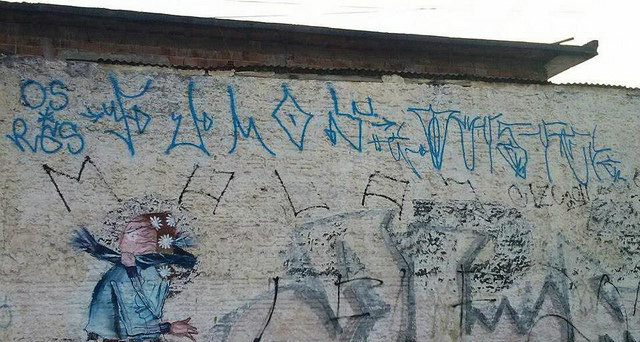
Another Example of Pichação from São Paulo, Brazil in 2013.

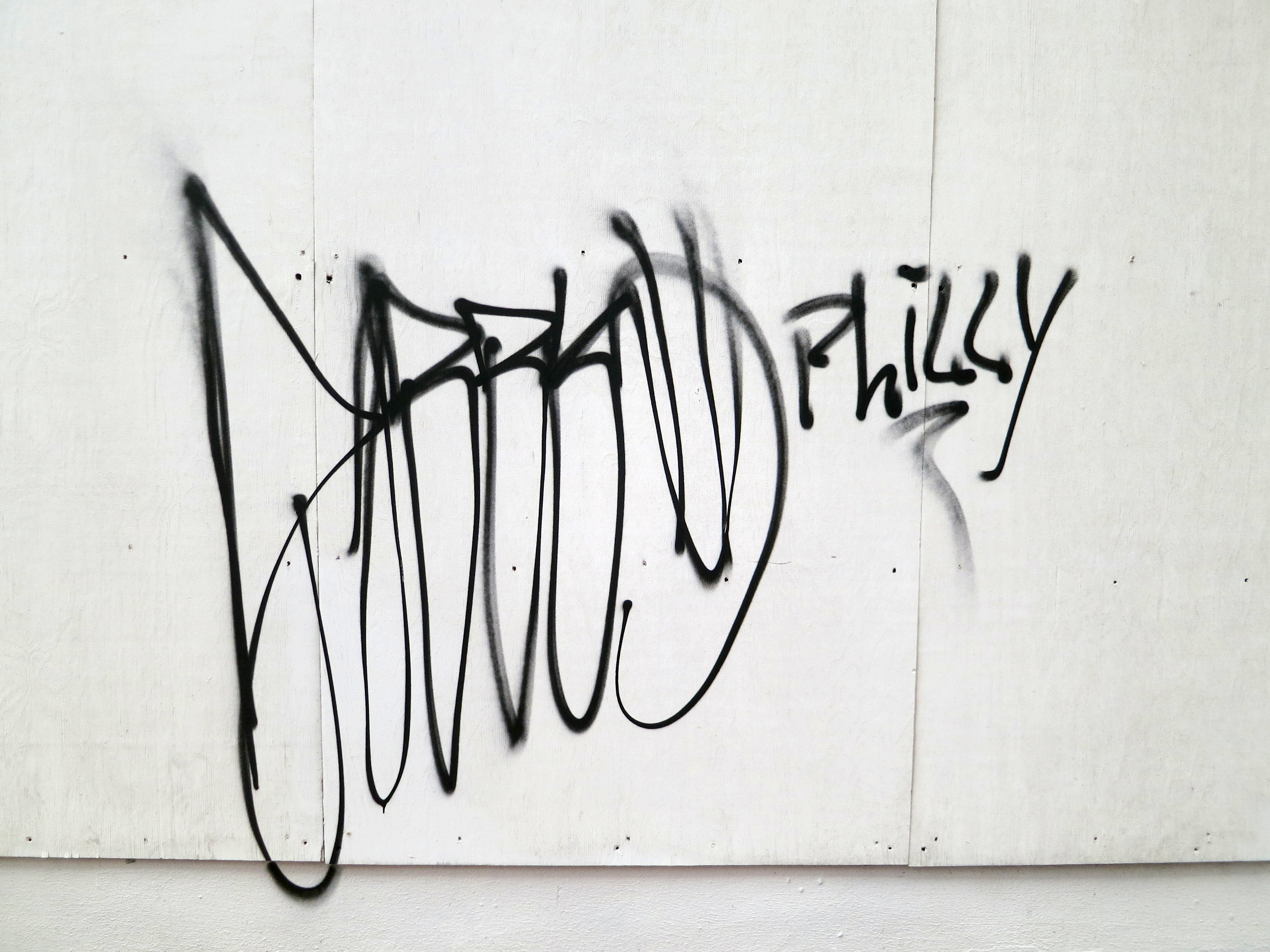
Example of Philly handstyle from 2014.

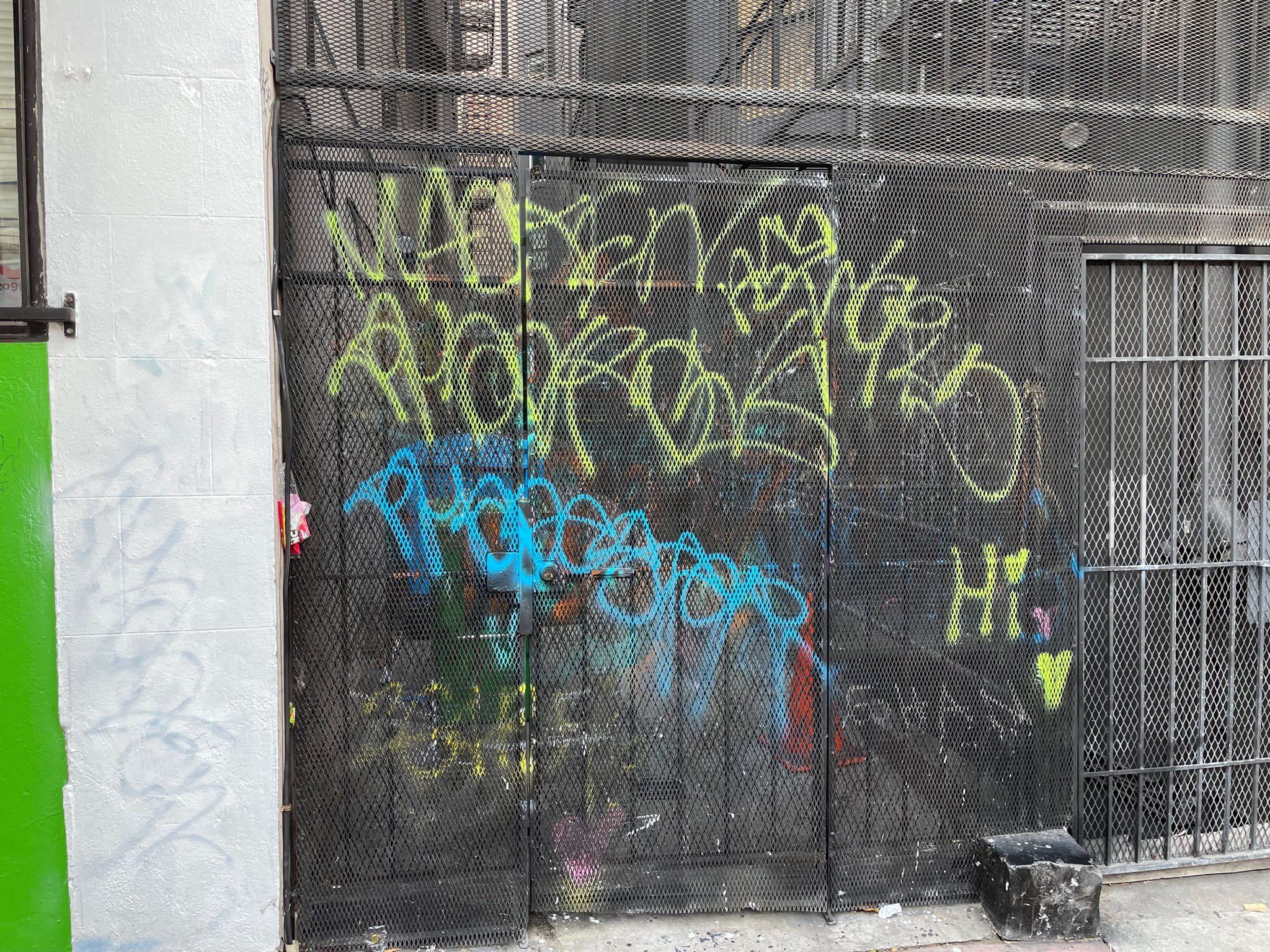
Example of bus flow from San Francisco in 2021.
