= Marmaduke School District =

School district in Arkansas, United States

Address
- 1010 Greyhound Drive Marmaduke, Arkansas, 72443; United States

District information
- Type: Public
- Grades: PreK–12
- NCES District ID: 0500016

Students and staff
- Students: 725
- Teachers: 66.33
- Staff: 65.0
- Student–teacher ratio: 10.93

Other information
- Website: www.marmadukeschool.com

Marmaduke School District is a school district based in Marmaduke, Arkansas.

The school district provides elementary and secondary education from pre school through grade 12 for approximately 800 students and employs more than 120 faculty and staff on a full time equivalent basis. The district encompasses 122.07 square miles (316.2 km^{2}) of land in Greene County, Arkansas, and supports all or portions of the communities of Marmaduke and Lafe.

Kindergarten through 6th grade is in the Elementary building. While 7th through 12th grade, is in the Marmaduke High School.

On July 1, 1984, the Lafe School District merged into the Marmaduke district.

== See also ==
- Greene County Tech School District
- Paragould School District
