= Tomasz Sikorski (artist) =

Polish street artist

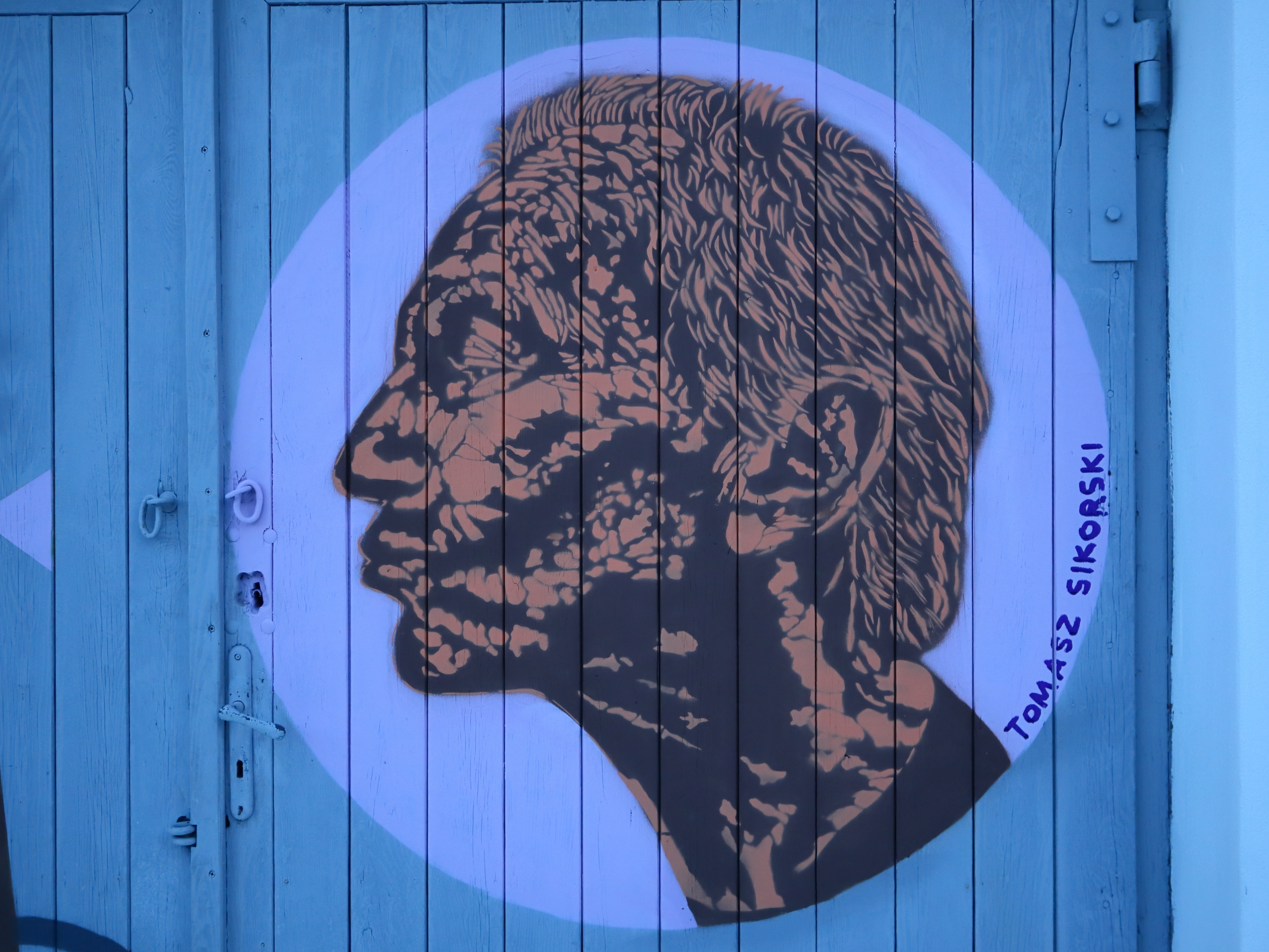
- Street art portrait of Sikorski in the Nowolipki area of Warsaw, 2022
- Born: 6 April 1952; Warsaw, Warsaw Voivodeship, Polish People's Republic
- Died: 26 April 2021 (aged 69); Warsaw, Masovian Voivodeship, Poland
- Resting place: Bródno Cemetery
- Education: Academy of Fine Arts
- Notable work: Graffiti w Polsce
- Style: Street art
- Movement: Graffiti
- Website: Tomasz Sikorski on Instagram

Tomasz Sikorski (6 April 1952 – 26 April 2021) was a Varsovian artist and early adopter of street art in Poland.

== Biography ==
=== Family and early life ===
On his maternal side, Sikorski's family had been resident in the area of Sielce going back to his great-grandparents. They operated a well-known inn which was frequented by Stanisław Grzesiuk in the late 1930s. His grandparents ran a liquor store and delicatessen below their tenement flat on Marszałkowska Street. Both his great-grandparents inn and grandparents tenement building were destroyed during the Warsaw Uprising. Sikorski was born in Warsaw on the 6 April 1953. As a student, he attended the Academy of Fine Arts in Warsaw.

=== Career ===
In the 1980s Sikorski travelled to New York City where he encountered graffiti and street art. On his return to Poland he began to incorporate street art into his own artistic practice. Sikorski adapted the Mermaid of Warsaw as a stencil for which he became well known. His stencil design incorporated the V sign as an anti-militarist reference both to WWII and contemporary anti-authoritarian movements.

In 1987 Sikorski attended the second Zielona Góra Biennale where he became acquainted with its organiser, leading to an 11-year post at a local pedagogical college which would later become the University of Zielona Góra. He would go on to hold a professorship at Jan Kochanowski University and head the sculpture studio at the Academy of Fine Arts.

=== Exhibitions ===
During his career Sikorski organised about 150 exhibitions and shows, as well as participating in about 100 more. In 2017 he curated the Dzika grafika exhibition at the Poster Museum, which included the work of Andrzej Dłużniewski, Fukow, Major Waldemar Fydrych, Piotr Młodożeniec, and Rafał Betlejewski amongst others. However, writing for Culture.pl Xawery Stańczyk criticised the exhibition as evidence of the process of recuperation of graffiti.

== Publications ==
- Sikorski, Tomasz; Rutkiewicz, Marcin (2011). Graffiti w Polsce 1940-2010 (in Polish). Carta Blanca.
