= Marmaduke, Arkansas =

- City
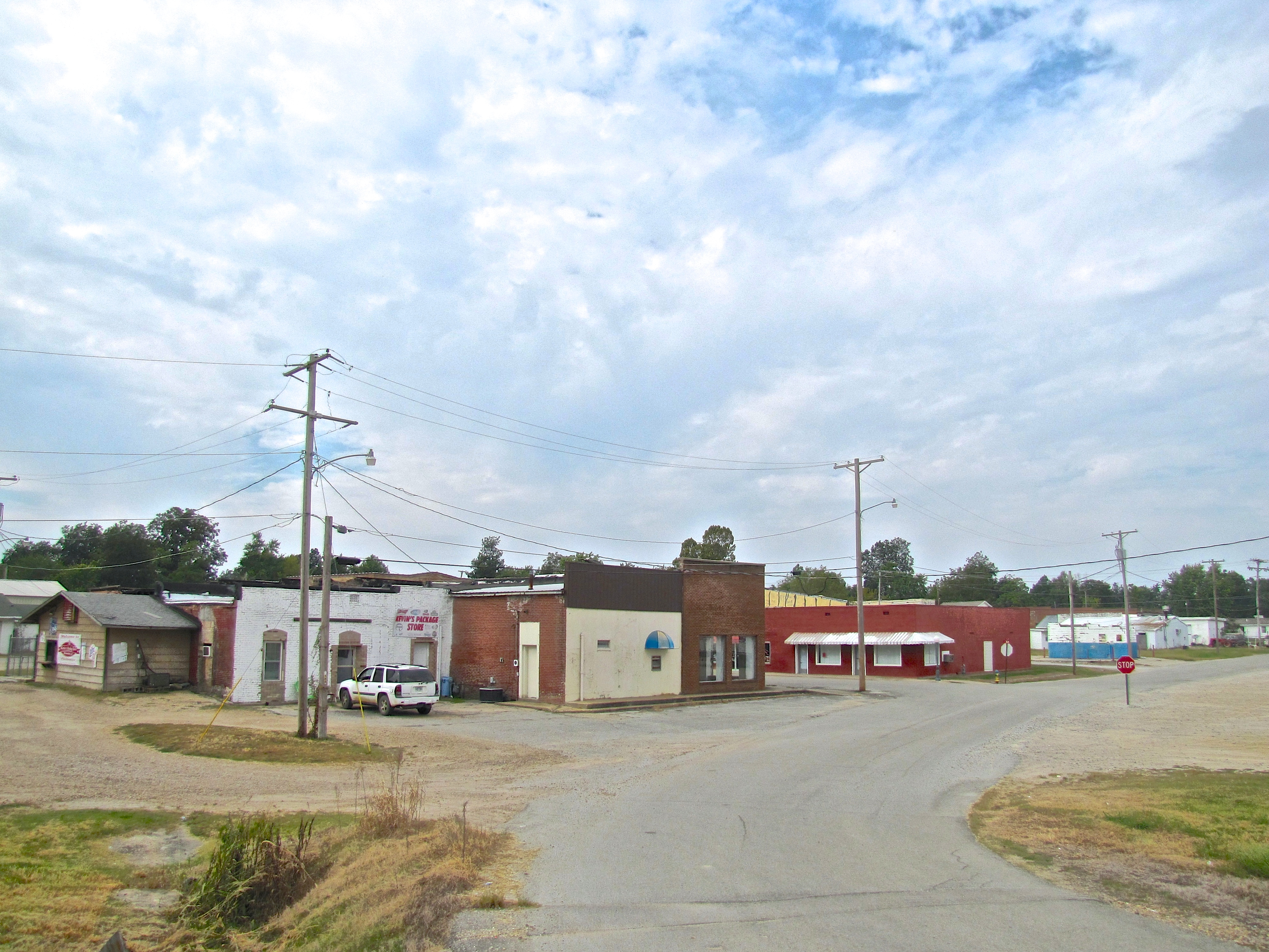
- Marmaduke

- Location of Marmaduke in Greene County, Arkansas.
- Coordinates: 36°11′22″N 90°22′48″W
- Country: United States
- State: Arkansas
- County: Greene

Area
  - Total: 1.40 sq mi (3.62 km^{2})
  - Land: 1.40 sq mi (3.62 km^{2})
  - Water: 0 sq mi (0.00 km^{2})
- Elevation: 289 ft (88 m)

Population (2020)
  - Total: 1,212
  - Estimate (2025): 1,254 ▲
  - Density: 866.8/sq mi (334.68/km^{2})
- Time zone: UTC−06:00 (Central (CST))
  - Summer (DST): UTC−05:00 (CDT)
- ZIP Codes: 72436, 72443
- Area code: 870
- FIPS code: 05-44240
- GNIS feature ID: 2405028
- Website: www.marmadukear.com

Marmaduke is a city in Greene County, Arkansas, United States. The population was 1,212 in 2020.

== History ==
The town of Marmaduke was named for Confederate Major General John Sappington Marmaduke, remembered for the Poison Spring massacre and who later served as governor of Missouri. Marmaduke was said to have established a camp for his soldiers near the site of the present town. The Texas and St. Louis Railroad was built through the area in 1882.

Marmaduke was incorporated on August 2, 1909, and, by 1914, had expanded to include two drugstores, three banks, three restaurants, a Methodist and a Southern Baptist church, two barber shops, a hotel, a boarding house, and two dime stores. The primary employers at the time were a sawmill, a lumber mill, a stave mill, and large and cut timber distributors.

Current industry includes the Anchor plastics company and the American Railcar Company.

The community was severely damaged by a severe tornado on April 2, 2006. At least half of the town was reported to have been destroyed or even flattened, and nearly every structure received some degree of damage. No one was killed in Marmaduke, but at least 50 people were injured, some seriously. In 2009, a major ice storm came across the northern part of Arkansas, causing the village, together with other regions, to lose electricity for a few weeks. Since then, the town has almost fully recovered.

== Geography ==
Marmaduke is located in northeastern Greene County. U.S. Route 49 passes through the center of Marmaduke, leading northeast 16 miles (26 km) to Piggott and southwest 10 miles (16 km) to Paragould, the Greene County seat. Arkansas Highway 34 crosses US 49 in the center of town; it leads east 5 miles (8 km) to Arkansas Highway 139 at Fritz and west 7 miles (11 km) to Lafe.

The city has a total area of 1.3 square miles (3.4 km^{2}), all land. Marmaduke is in the northern part of the Arkansas Delta physical region and sits just east of Crowley's Ridge. The Missouri state line, following the St. Francis River, is 9 miles (14 km) to the east.

== Demographics ==
Historical population
Census	Pop.	Note	%±
1910	780		—
1920	861		10.4%
1930	894		3.8%
1940	677		−24.3%
1950	643		−5.0%
1960	657		2.2%
1970	821		25.0%
1980	1,168		42.3%
1990	1,164		−0.3%
2000	1,158		−0.5%
2010	1,111		−4.1%
2020	1,212		9.1%
2025 (est.)	1,254	▲	3.5%
U.S. Decennial Census

=== 2020 census ===
Marmaduke racial composition
Race	Number	Percentage
White (non-Hispanic)	1,113	91.83%
Black or African American (non-Hispanic)	4	0.33%
Native American	1	0.08%
Asian	2	0.17%
Other/Mixed	48	3.96%
Hispanic or Latino	44	3.63%

As of the 2020 census, there were 1,212 people, 468 households, and 358 families residing in the city.

The median age was 33.8 years. About 29.1% of residents were under the age of 18 and 14.0% were 65 years of age or older. For every 100 females, there were 84.8 males, and for every 100 females age 18 and over, there were 83.2 males age 18 and over.

Of residents, 0.0% lived in urban areas and 100.0% lived in rural areas.

There were 468 households, of which 41.2% had children under the age of 18 living in them. Of all households, 41.5% were married-couple households, 15.0% were households with a male householder and no spouse or partner present, and 34.6% were households with a female householder and no spouse or partner present. About 26.5% of all households were made up of individuals, and 10.7% had someone living alone who was 65 years of age or older.

There were 523 housing units, of which 10.5% were vacant. The homeowner vacancy rate was 2.6%, and the rental vacancy rate was 5.4%.

=== 2010 census ===
As of the 2010 United States census, there were 1,111 people living in the city. The racial makeup of the city was 96.5% White, 0.1% Native American, 0.1% Asian and 1.6% from two or more races. 1.7% were Hispanic or Latino of any race.

=== 2000 census ===
As of the census of 2000, there were 1,158 people, 487 households, and 323 families living in the city. The population density was 871.6 inhabitants per square mile (336.5/km^{2}). There were 528 housing units at an average density of 397.4 per square mile (153.4/km^{2}). The racial makeup of the city was 96.80% White, 0.43% Native American, 0.09% Asian, 0.52% from other races, and 2.16% from two or more races. 0.78% of the population were Hispanic or Latino of any race.

There were 487 households, out of which 32.4% had children under the age of 18 living with them, 53.2% were married couples living together, 10.5% had a female householder with no husband present, and 33.5% were non-families. 30.0% of all households were made up of individuals, and 16.4% had someone living alone who was 65 years of age or older. The average household size was 2.34 and the average family size was 2.93.

In the city, the population was spread out, with 25.2% under the age of 18, 7.7% from 18 to 24, 28.1% from 25 to 44, 22.5% from 45 to 64, and 16.6% who were 65 years of age or older. The median age was 36 years. For every 100 females, there were 85.6 males. For every 100 females age 18 and over, there were 84.3 males.

The median income for a household in the city was $23,300, and the median income for a family was $31,016. Males had a median income of $23,375 versus $19,432 for females. The per capita income for the city was $11,506. About 18.1% of families and 20.4% of the population were below the poverty line, including 24.8% of those under age 18 and 19.7% of those age 65 or over.

== Education ==
Public education for elementary and secondary schools is provided by the Marmaduke School District, which leads to graduation from Marmaduke High School.
