= Dylan Golden Aycock =

American primitive guitarist (born 1985)

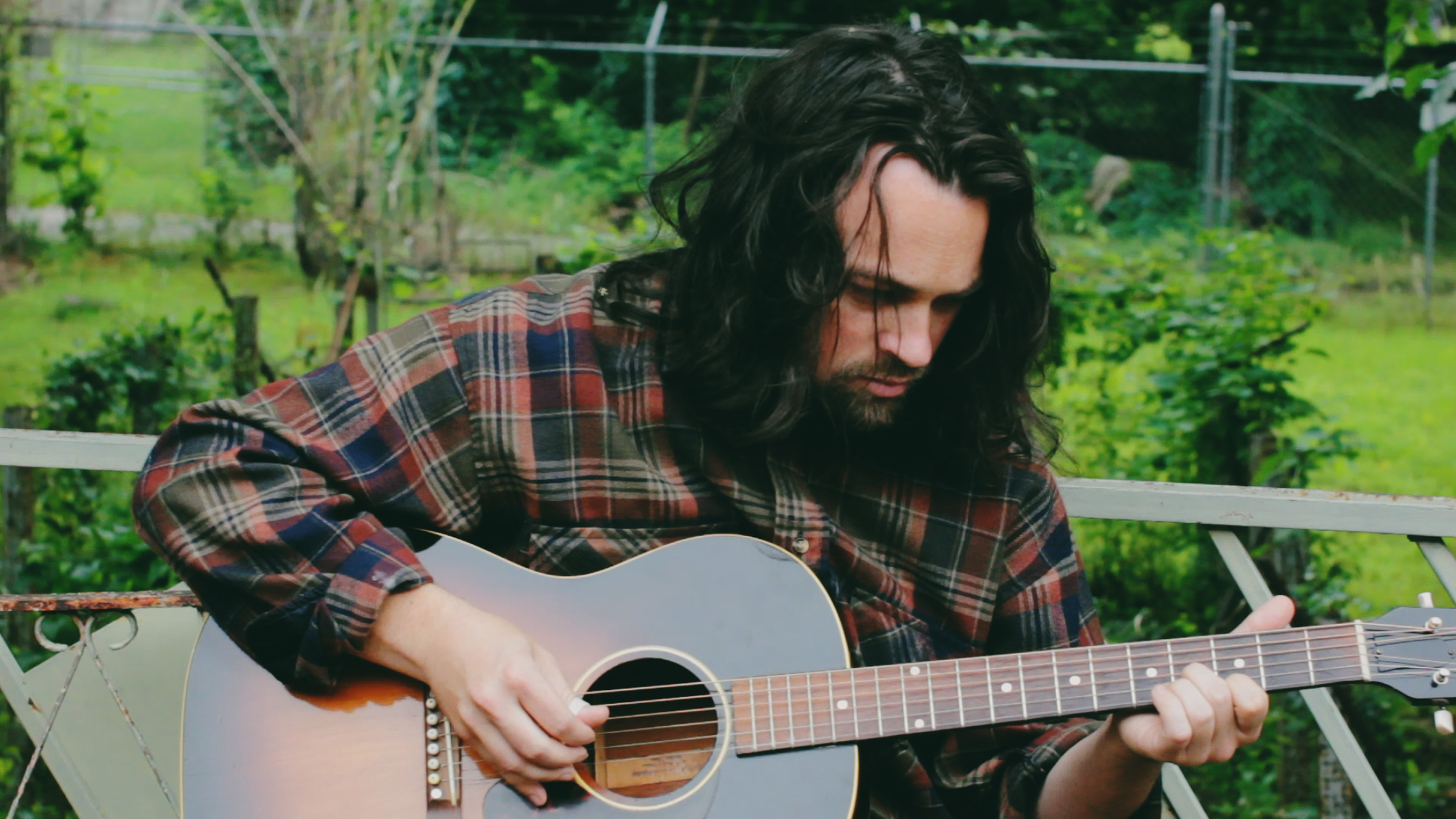
- Dylan Golden Aycock in 2016

Background information
- Also known as: Talk West
- Born: Dylan Golden Aycock; October 16, 1985 (age 40); Tulsa, Oklahoma, U.S.
- Genres: Folk drone, pop rock
- Occupation: Musician
- Instrument: Guitar
- Years active: 2006–present
- Label: Scissor Tail
- Website: www.dylangoldenaycock.com

Dylan Golden Aycock (born 1985) is an American Primitive guitarist and Experimental Musician from Tulsa, Oklahoma. In 2016, NPR named Dylan Golden Aycock's Church of Level Track one of the "Top 10 Solo Guitar Records of 2016" Uncut Magazine described him as "respectfully expanding on Takoma School roots, moving towards the sort of chamber folk compositions mastered by James Blackshaw and William Tyler." In the Bandcamp article "New Directions in Acoustic Guitar" Pitchfork writer Marc Masters writes "Aycock credited with nine different instruments, including violin, drums, pedal steel guitar and synthesizers add atmosphere to his thoughtful picking."

== Background ==
Aycock began making music as a turntablist in 2004 before later moving to drums and in 2011 he began playing solo instrumental guitar. He has released music under his own name as well as Talk West, The Doldrums, and in 2007 was a member of the band Mar whose debut album was recorded in Iceland with members of múm and The Album Leaf. His father is a songwriter, poet and radio DJ on NPR and his mother is a painter. In addition, Aycock has an older brother named Jesse Aycock who is lap steel guitar player for Hard Working Americans which is made up of Todd Snider (deceased, 2025), Dave Schools (of Widespread Panic), guitarist Neal Casal(deceased, 2019), keyboard player Chad Staehly and drummer Duane Trucks.

== Music ==
Aycock was first a member of The Doldrums and Mar, which started in 2006, this was before he became a solo artist. Aycock formed The Doldrums with Mark Kuykendall at the age of 19. Before releasing music under his own name, Aycock used Talk West as working title for his solo music. Most of the Talk West releases were focused around the Pedal Steel guitar and cassette. In 2016, Aycock released a critically acclaimed solo album entitled Church of Level Track, The album takes its name from the infamous train moniker artist Colossus of Roads. Aside from solo and collaborative works, Aycock founded the record label Scissor Tail Editions in 2010 at the age of 24. The label released albums from Scott Tuma of Souled American, Scott Hirsch of Hiss Golden Messenger, Nadia Reid whose album Listen to Formation, Look for the Signs received critical acclaim from The New York Times, The Guardian, Pitchfork and NPR, BBC Music and many others. Aycock's most notable contribution to Scissor Tail was reissuing the soundtrack for Peter Fonda's 1971 American western film The Hired Hand. The film score was composed by Bruce Langhorne who is most known for his session work in Greenwich Village in the early '60s. Bruce Langhorne accompanied Bob Dylan, Odetta, Richie Havens, and many others. In 2017, a few months before Langhorne's death, Aycock compiled tribute album to Bruce Langhorne with Loren Connors. The tribute album featured John Fahey, Lee Ranaldo, Steve Gunn, Susan Alcorn, Eugene Chadbourne, Califone, Elliott Sharp and many other notable instrumentalists. Following the release of the tribute album Aycock organized two tribute concerts for Bruce Langhorne, one in New York City with Steve Gunn, Steven Shelley of Sonic Youth and one concert in London.

== Discography ==
Year	Album details	Peak chart positions		
Year	Album details	US	US Folk	US Heat
2013	Rise and Shine: Released: February 14, 2013; Label: Scissor Tail Records; Format: LP, digital download	—	—	—
2016	Church of Level Track: Released: September 16, 2016; Label: Scissor Tail Records; Format: CD, LP, digital download	—	—	—
