= Piece (graffiti) =

Large elaborate forms of graffiti

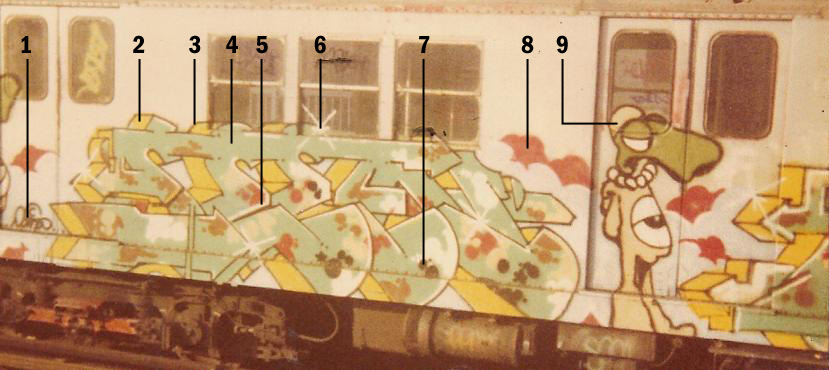
An image of a piece painted by Seen on an IRT 6 subway car, c. 1980. The numbers 1-9 illustrate the elements of the work: 1) tag, 2) yellow blocks, 3) black outlines, 4) green fill-in, 5) white inlines, 6) highlights, 7) bubble(s), 8) cloud/background, and 9) character

Pieces, short for "masterpieces", are a form of graffiti that involves large, elaborate and detailed letter forms. They are one of the main forms of modern graffiti, along with tags and throw ups, and are the least controversial of the three and least likely to be seen as vandalism.

Due to their size, pieces are almost always done in aerosol spray paint, but graffiti artists may use paint rollers for large areas that require filling in with paint.

== Form ==
Pieces tend to be large, with multi-coloured fills and outlines. They often incorporate highlights, shadows, and a background, and may use extensions on letter forms, 3D effects, and sometimes characters.

Because of their complexity and large size, pieces usually take a significant amount of time to plan and paint and therefore are often found on legal walls. Illegal pieces tend to be found in less crowded spaces such as train yards, tunnels, drains, rooftops, and walls facing train tracks. Illegal pieces done in busier areas are often done over multiple nights or by multiple members of a crew.

Many people unfamiliar with graffiti forms can find it difficult to distinguish the letters in more elaborate pieces. While straight-letters are pieces with clear letters that prioritise legibility, wildstyle pieces have extremely exaggerated letters forms with multiple extensions and add-ons, and are often illegible to many people. This may be a deliberate choice to allow only those familiar with the art form to read them. Some writers choose to sign their pieces with personal and crew tags.

== History ==
Pieces were first observed in the 1980s on trains in the New York Subway, which caused the metro to stop dispatching trains with painted carriages. This instead had the unintended effect of writers opting instead to paint pieces on city walls.

Pieces are more likely to be considered a "true" art form by people outside of the graffiti community. With the rise of commercial graffiti since the late 2000s, legal pieces are sometimes commissioned by local businesses as promotion, or by local councils with the intention of discouraging less appreciated forms of graffiti such as tags, given that many writers will not go over another artist's work.

== Popular culture ==
Art galleries may feature pieces, either directly on canvas or in photography. Critics say that pieces originally in the street then put in galleries have their context and function removed, and recontexualise a piece from being public communication to one-way communication of those more privileged. Pieces seen in public areas like streets have been shown to have a stronger emotional value for viewers than when seen in a museum. Others argue that pieces in galleries allow the art to reach people who otherwise might dismiss it.

Areas with large amounts of elaborate pieces can become tourist attractions such as Hosier Lane in Melbourne, which are advocated by tourism groups despite the pieces being illegal.
