= Pichação =

Style of graffiti developed in Brazil

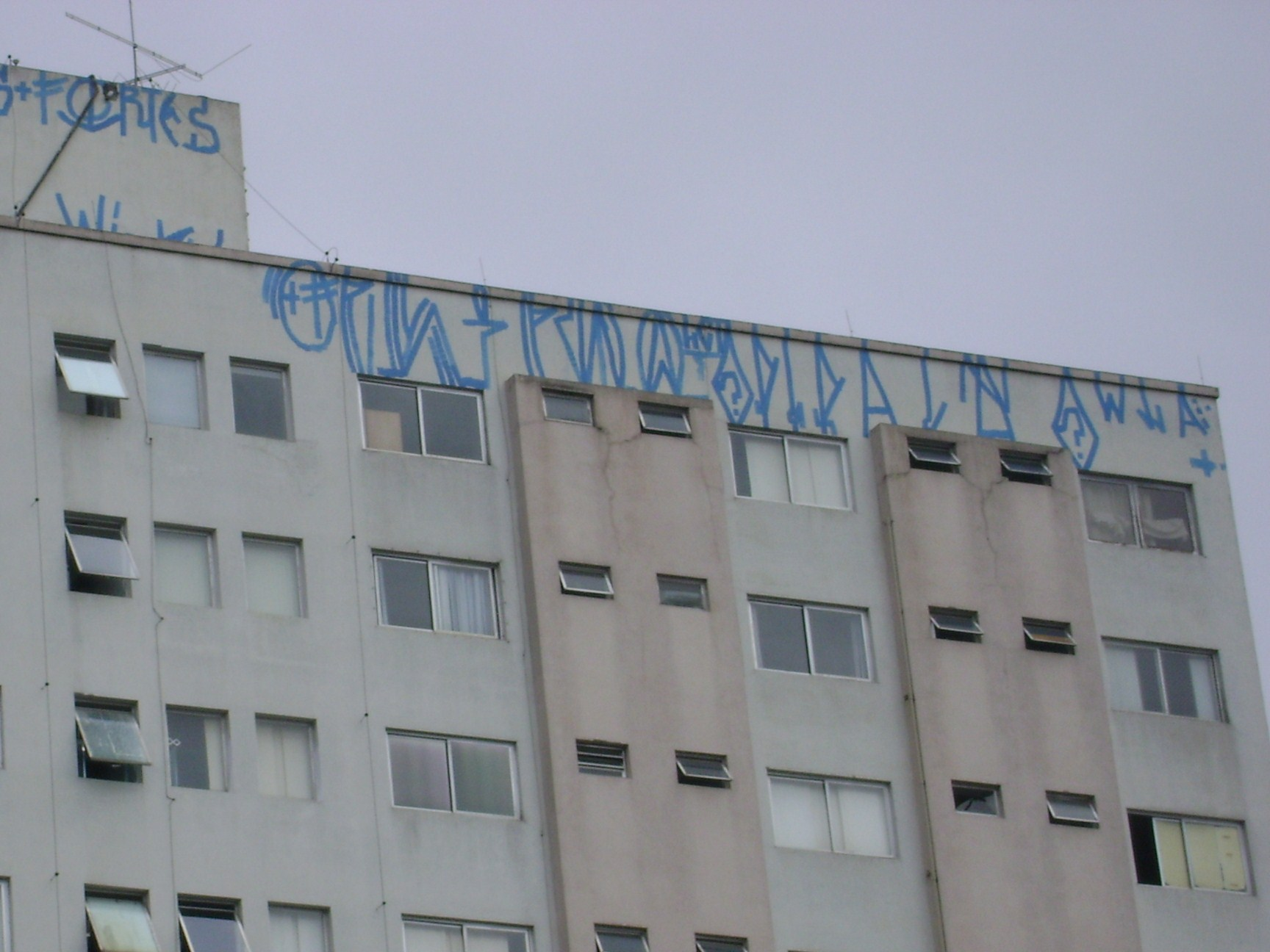
- Years active: 1980s–present
- Location: São Paulo and other South–Central Brazilian cities
- Influences: Heavy metal aesthetic
- Influenced: 21st century graffiti

Pichação, sometimes misspelled as pixação (Portuguese pronunciation: [piʃaˈsɐ̃w]), is the name given to a type of Brazilian graffiti. It consists of tagging done in a distinctive, cryptic style, mainly on walls and vacant buildings. Many pichadores (pichação painters) compete to paint in high and inaccessible places, using such techniques as free climbing and abseiling to reach the locations. Pichação is mostly seen as an act of vandalism. The main difference between graffiti and pichação is between their artistic expression, with pichação being defined as a form of protest and social validation.

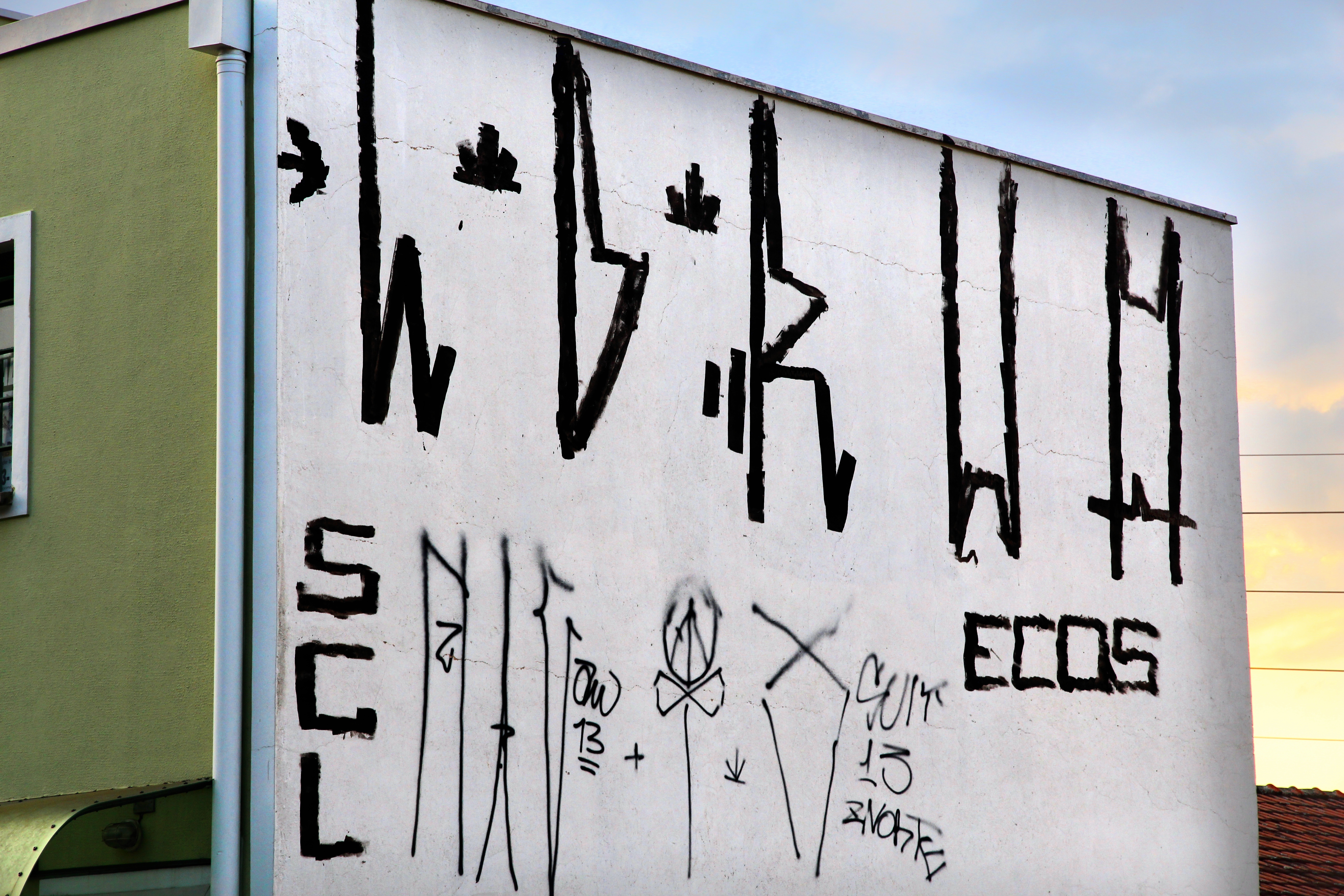
Pichação in Curitiba

== History ==
Pichação, known also as "wall writings", or pixo, began in the 1940s and 1950s as political statements written in tar and "were often written in response to the slogans painted by political parties across the streets." Piche is the Portuguese word for pitch or tar, and pichação originally meant writing in pitch. In the 1970s, pichação almost disappeared, but it was revived in the 1980s by a group of youths who began writing their names, and the names of their crews, instead of political slogans.

Pichação has been described as a "vehicle for the youth of the city to assert their existence and self-worth, and to do it loudly. As a social protest, Pichação is brutal, effective, and pulls no punches. There is no country on earth with a worse distribution of wealth than Brazil. For the rich, there are nice buildings. For the poor, there are shanty towns. Pichação exists on the very surface of the contested wealth, and promises to keep on punishing the fortunate until they produce a world less punishing to begin with."

The practice is considered a form of protest against the city's unequal distribution of wealth and a way to draw attention to the plight of the poor and marginalized communities.

In contrast to conventional graffiti styles that emerged in 1970s New York, Brazilian pichação was inspired by blackletter typefaces and runic style lettering that were commonly used on record sleeves by popular heavy metal bands in the 1980s. Since 2019 pichação has also appeared in Dublin, Ireland, due to the large number of Brazilians in the city.

== Methods ==
Although its name is derived from the word for tar, many of the pichadores (those who do pichação) in São Paulo use a 2-3 inch foam roller, spray paint and latex paint; it is what is known in English-speaking countries by the Italian word "graffiti". In other cities, such as Rio de Janeiro, pichadores use only spray paint. Many pichadores write their crew name, while others write their own individual name. The letters are usually of equal height and spacing, although technique varies in different cities around Brazil. Although the lettering originally reflected the typography of eighties heavy metal record covers, the styles have evolved over time.

Pichadores often compete to tag the tallest, most dangerous, and most noteworthy locations. One example of this is the group Irreverentes, who bragged about tagging the internationally-known Christ the Redeemer statue in Rio de Janeiro.
