= Lafe, Arkansas =

- Town
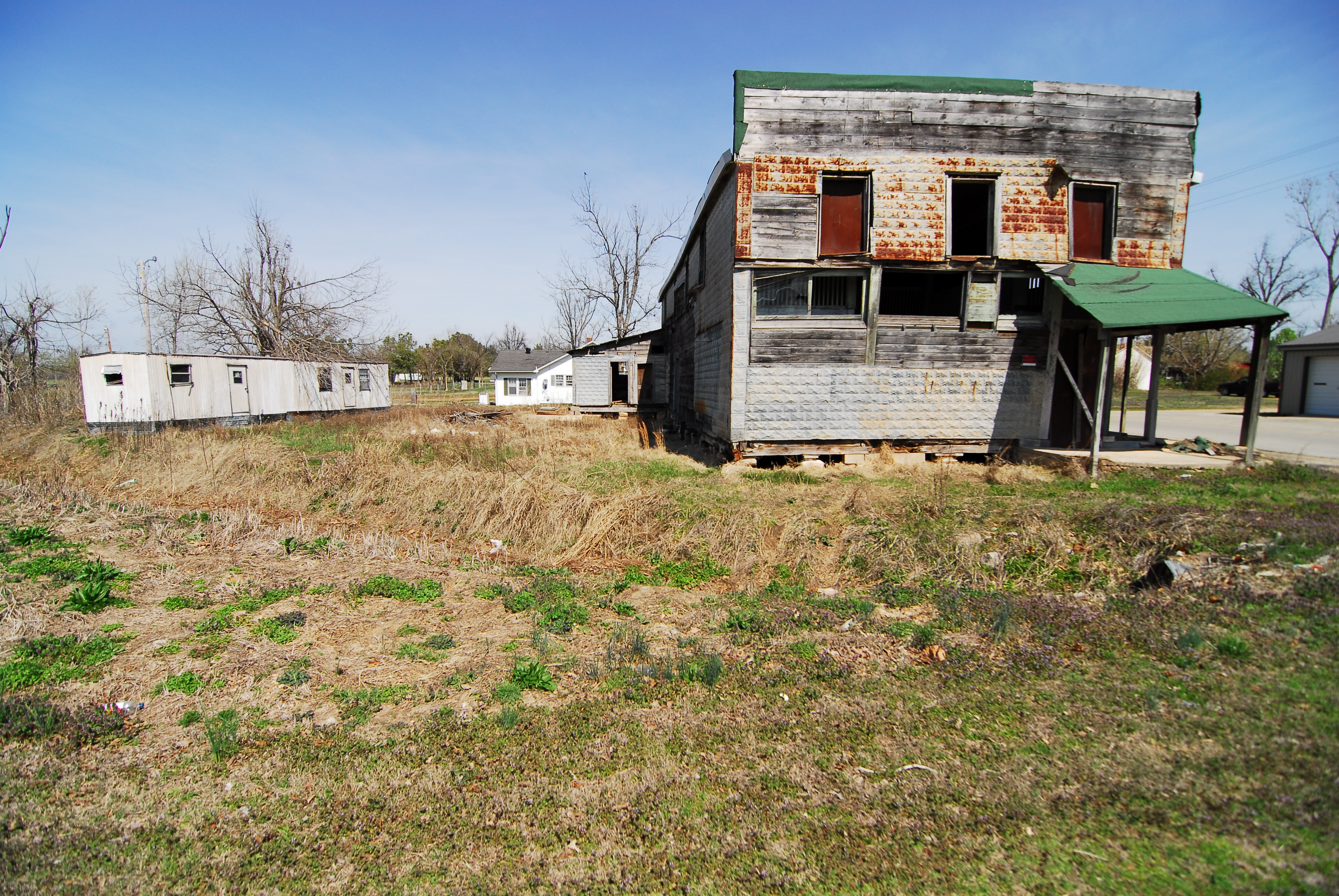
- Lafe

- Location of Lafe in Greene County, Arkansas.
- Coordinates: 36°12′18″N 90°30′25″W
- Country: United States
- State: Arkansas
- County: Greene

Area
  - Total: 2.03 sq mi (5.26 km^{2})
  - Land: 2.03 sq mi (5.26 km^{2})
  - Water: 0 sq mi (0.00 km^{2})
- Elevation: 335 ft (102 m)

Population (2020)
  - Total: 418
  - Estimate (2025): 419 ▲
  - Density: 205.7/sq mi (79.41/km^{2})
- Time zone: UTC−06:00 (Central (CST))
  - Summer (DST): UTC−05:00 (CDT)
- ZIP Code: 72436
- Area code: 870
- FIPS code: 05-37660
- GNIS feature ID: 2405966

Lafe is a town in Greene County, Arkansas, United States on Crowley's Ridge. As of the 2020 census, Lafe had a population of 418.

== History ==
The first settler of Lafe was Herman Toelken, a German immigrant who had been living in New Haven, Missouri, and was seeking new opportunities in an unsettled area. Toelken began cutting railroad ties for the St. Louis, Iron Mountain and Southern (later Missouri Pacific) railroad in order to save enough money to purchase land and send for his family.

When Toelken was settled he began advertising in a Minneapolis German newspaper seeking other German Lutherans to come to the area. Several families responded to this advertisement, and an assortment of German immigrant families followed him from Franklin County, Missouri.

On December 9, 1889, an application was made to the US Postal Service for the establishment of a post office for "Newberry, Arkansas", so named due to a sawmill operator of the same name who had set up in the area. The name "Newberry" was denied by the Postal Service, so the postmaster combined the names of his daughters and reapplied with the name "Loulyma", which was accepted. Mail arrived addressed to "Loulyma" and freight arrived addressed to "Newberry". In 1901 a new postmaster named Lafayette Mueller took over and sought to settle the name permanently by resubmitting a new name. Townspeople elected to name the town "Lafe" in honor of the new postmaster, and the name was officially changed on May 21, 1902.

== Geography ==
Lafe is located in the valley of Big Creek on the western side of Crowley's Ridge, with Big Creek flowing northwest towards the Black River. Arkansas Highways 135 and 34 intersect in Lafe; Highway 135 leads north 14 miles (23 km) to U.S. Route 62 east of Corning and south 11 miles (18 km) to Paragould, the Greene County seat, while Highway 34 leads east 8 miles (13 km) to Marmaduke.

According to the United States Census Bureau, the town of Lafe has a total area of 2.1 square miles (5.4 km^{2}), all land.

== Demographics ==
Historical population
Census	Pop.	Note	%±
1980	215		—
1990	315		46.5%
2000	385		22.2%
2010	458		19.0%
2020	418		−8.7%
2025 (est.)	419	▲	0.2%
U.S. Decennial Census

As of the 2010 United States census, there were 458 people living in the town. The racial makeup of the town was 98.0% White, 0.2% from some other race and 0.4% from two or more races. 1.3% were Hispanic or Latino of any race.

As of the census of 2000, there were 385 people, 137 households, and 110 families living in the town. The population density was 71.1 people/km^{2} (184 people/mi^{2}). There were 153 housing units at an average density of 28.3 units/km^{2} (73 units/mi^{2}). The racial makeup of the town was 89.09% White, 2.34% Native American, and 8.57% from two or more races. 0.78% of the population were Hispanic or Latino of any race.

There were 137 households, out of which 36.5% had children under the age of 18 living with them, 65.0% were married couples living together, 10.9% had a female householder with no husband present, and 19.0% were non-families. 16.1% of all households were made up of individuals, and 7.3% had someone living alone who was 65 years of age or older. The average household size was 2.81 and the average family size was 3.14.

In the town, the population was spread out, with 27.5% under the age of 18, 9.4% from 18 to 24, 30.9% from 25 to 44, 23.4% from 45 to 64, and 8.8% who were 65 years of age or older. The median age was 34 years. For every 100 females, there were 87.8 males. For every 100 females age 18 and over, there were 89.8 males.

The median income for a household in the town was $30,938, and the median income for a family was $32,125. Males had a median income of $25,313 versus $16,667 for females. The per capita income for the town was $12,234. About 15.0% of families and 17.7% of the population were below the poverty line, including 22.7% of those under age 18 and 8.6% of those age 65 or over.

== Education ==
The Marmaduke School District serves Lafe. On July 1, 1984, the Lafe School District merged into the Marmaduke district.
