= Moniker (graffiti) =

Graffiti

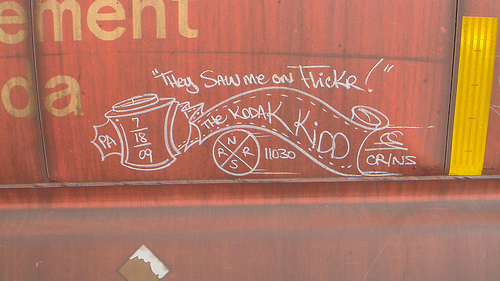
Moniker produced by "The Kodak Kidd"

Monikers (also known as streaks, tags, or hobo art) are a type of graffiti done on the side of a freight car on freight trains. They date back to the late 1800s. Monikers are usually produced with a solid paint stick, industrial crayon, or a lumber crayon. Monikers serve the purpose for a moniker artist to share stories or a moment in time with others.

Monikers are usually basic line drawings and may include a name and date.

Many moniker artists have a unique design they produce, and sometimes write the area they are from, or date that the moniker was produced. Occasionally, a short phrase will accompany monikers (this being started by BuZ blurr, famous for his Colossus of Roads moniker).

Most of the earliest artists were hoboes and railroad workers, but since the emergence of modern graffiti in the 1960s, railroad enthusiasts and graffiti writers also use monikers.

== History ==
Monikers (sometimes monicas) date to the late 1800s, where they were used by hoboes (itinerant laborers) to communicate. These generally consisted simply of a road name (moniker), a date, and the direction the hobo was heading then. This would be written in a prominent location where other hoboes would see it. Jack London, in recounting his hobo days, wrote,

Water-tanks are tramp directories. Not all in idle wantonness do tramps carve their monicas, dates, and courses. Often and often have I met hoboes earnestly inquiring if I had seen anywhere such and such a "stiff" or his monica. And more than once I have been able to give the monica of recent date, the water-tank, and the direction in which he was then bound. And promptly the hobo to whom I gave the information lit out after his pal. I have met hoboes who, in trying to catch a pal, had pursued clear across the continent and back again, and were still going.

The use of monikers persists to this day, although since the rise of cell phones a moniker is more often used simply to "tag" a train car or location. Some moniker writers have tagged train cars extensively; one who tagged under the name Bozo Texino during the 1970s and ’80s estimated that in one year ("where I went overboard") he marked over 30,000 train cars. However, not all moniker writers (or "boxcar artists") are hoboes; Bozo Texino in fact worked for the railroad, though others such as "A No. 1" and "Palm Tree Herby" rode trains as tramps or hoboes.
