= Tag (graffiti) =

Form of graffiti

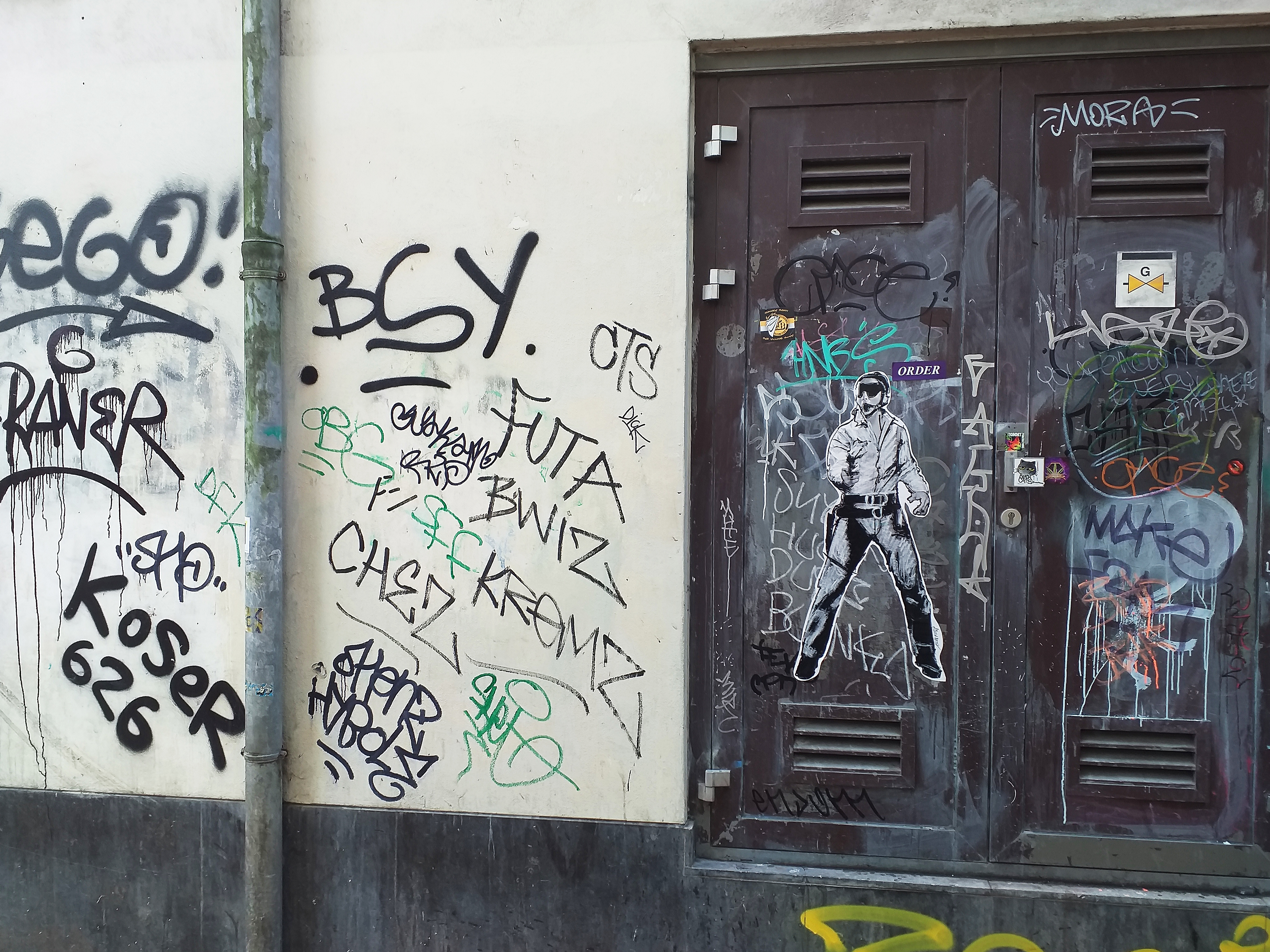
- Script type: Alternative Latin script
- Created: 1960s
- Period: 20th century – present
- Languages: English

Tags are one of the primary forms of modern graffiti, along with throw ups and pieces. The act of writing a tag is known as tagging. Tags are often thought of as the simplest form of graffiti art, prioritizing flow and style, and are the form that most artists start with. Tags, perhaps due to their simplicity, are more likely to be considered vandalism than other more elaborate graffiti styles. Tags are artists' signatures and vary in uniqueness and methods.

== Form ==
Often produced using spray paint or markers, tags are established from throw-up and pieces. They are two-dimensional, often smaller in size, and with thinner lines reflecting the need for quick execution due to the often illegal nature of tagging. This necessity for speed has led to tags which are written in a single stroke called one-liners.

While throw-ups and pieces may be formed from any word or even a sentence, a tag functions similarly to a signature, as if they are the graffiti artist's pseudonym (although rarely a personal name may be used) written in the artist's unique style so that two artists with the same name would be distinguishable, although an artist using the name of an existing artist in their locale or a "king" (well-respected artists) is a faux pas. An individual's unique style is called a handstyle.

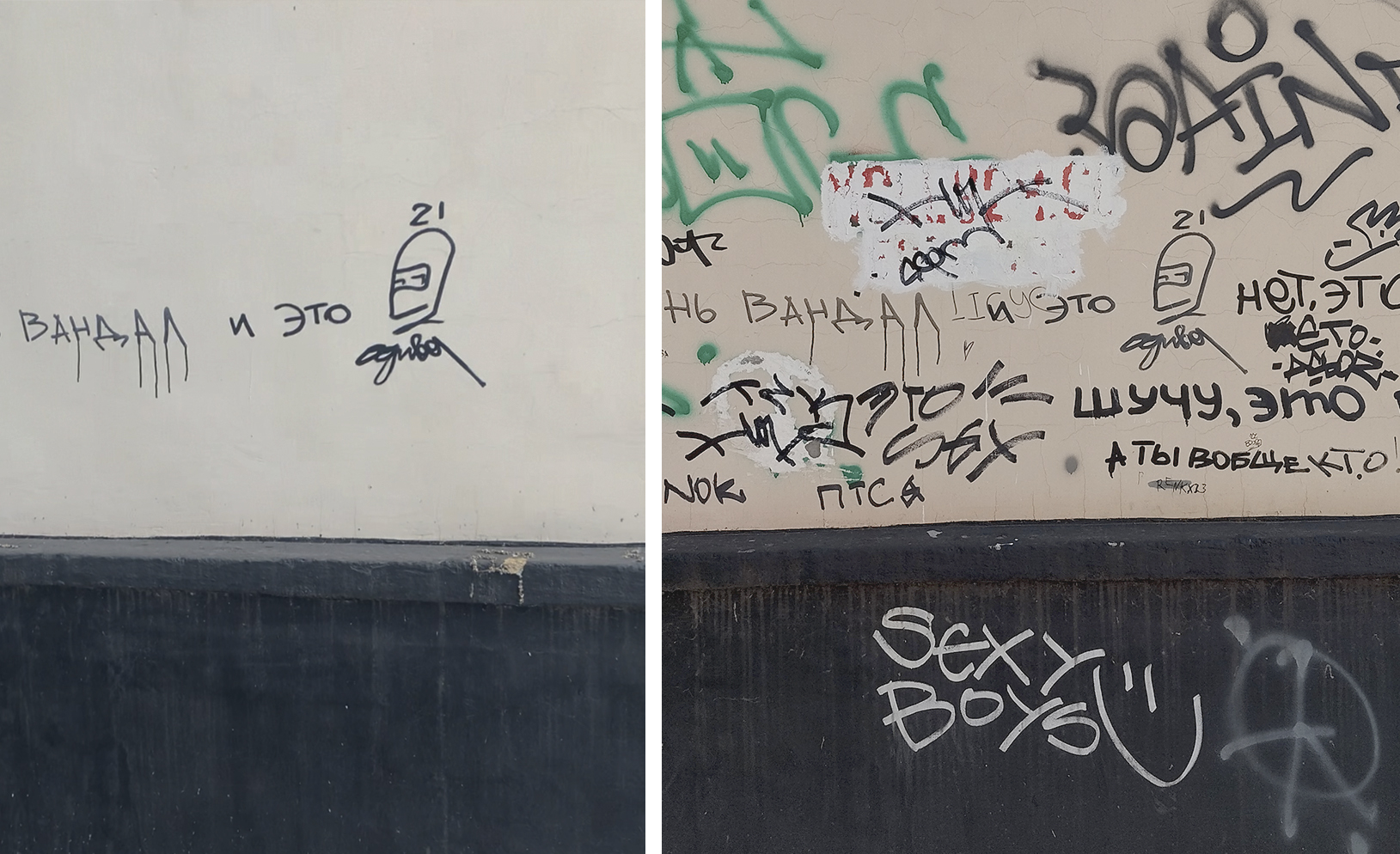
Tags are mostly used for anonymous communication on streets. Kryvyi Rih, Ukraine 2023

Tags may be existing words or made-up by the writer, but are usually only 3–5 letters or digits long, again due to the necessity of speed. Many tags use Latin script even in countries where this is not the primary writing system.

About tagging, graffiti artist Kaves has explained that "with graffiti, most people can pass by and not even give a shit about it while other people are looking at the style, the letters—the technical stuff, y’know? The many layers of it. So, learning that over the years, you start to find your own style—your own voice".

== History ==
Tags were the first form of modern graffiti. While people have been writing their names on things since ancient times, tags were unique as stylised monikers writers used to "get up" (make their name seen by as many people as possible).

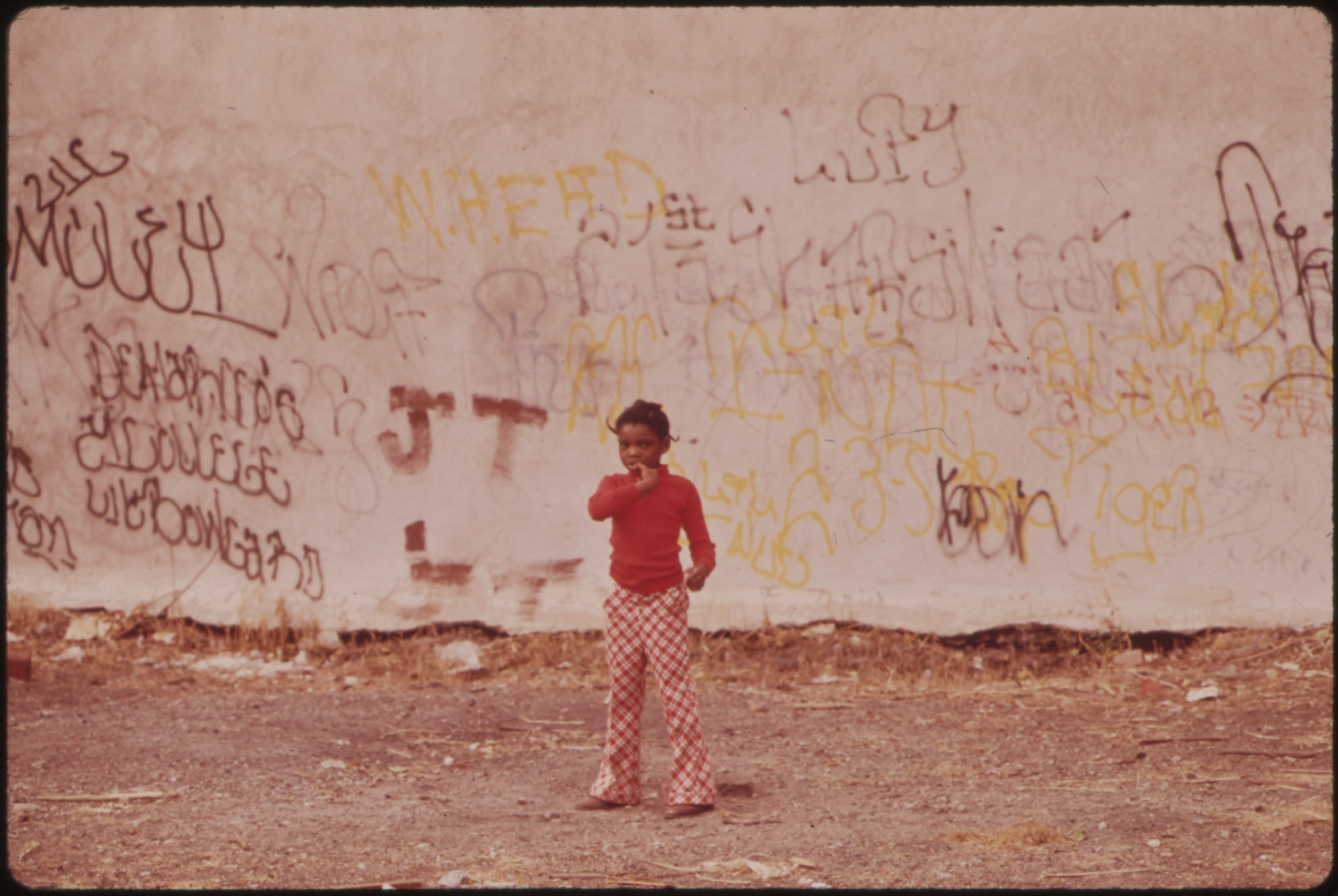
A child stands in front of a wall of tags in North Philadelphia, 1973

Tags originated in Philadelphia with writer Cornbread, and became hugely popular in New York City in the 1960s and 70s with artists such as TAKI 183 and Julio 204 who unlike Cornbread, wrote over the whole city rather than just their own small locale.

== Function ==
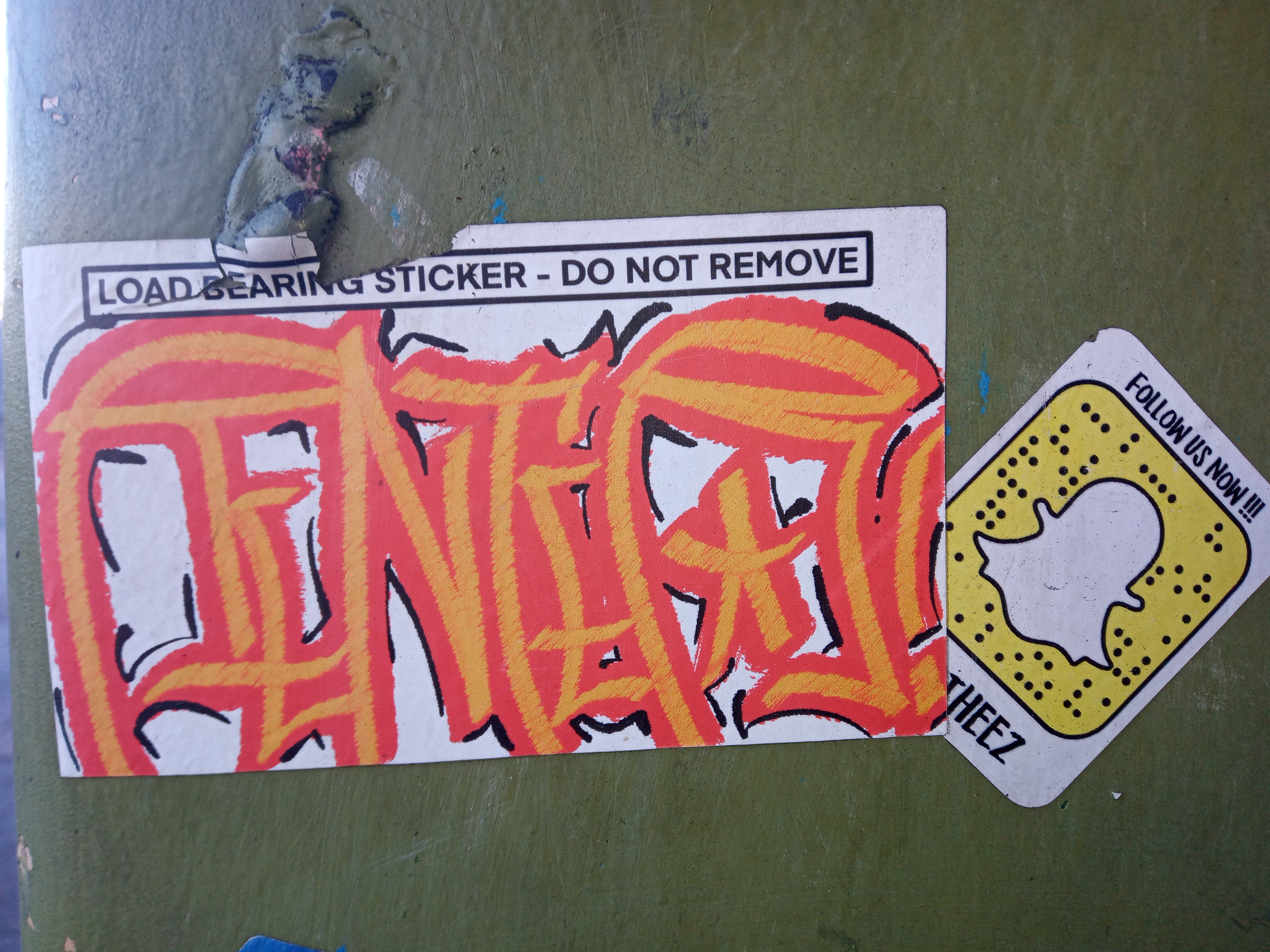
A sticker with a tag on it. Sydney, 2022

The purpose of the tag is for an artist to have their tags recognised by other artists in their locale. The most prevalent taggers in an area are known as "all city", a term that originated in traditional New York graffiti.

While tags are often written onto objects directly, they are also sometimes written onto stickers (known as slaps) and stuck onto things, which is a faster and safer method when illegally tagging. Postal and ‘my name is...’ stickers are commonly used for this purpose.

== Crew tags ==
Crew tags function differently to personal tags, as they are written by multiple members of the same crew, who all have their own handstyles. Crew tags are often initials and tend to be shorter than personal tags using only 2–3 letters.

They are sometimes postcodes. Crew tags are often put up next to personal tags, or used to sign larger pieces, especially if made by multiple members of a crew.

== See also ==
- Nickname
