= Graffiti in the United States =

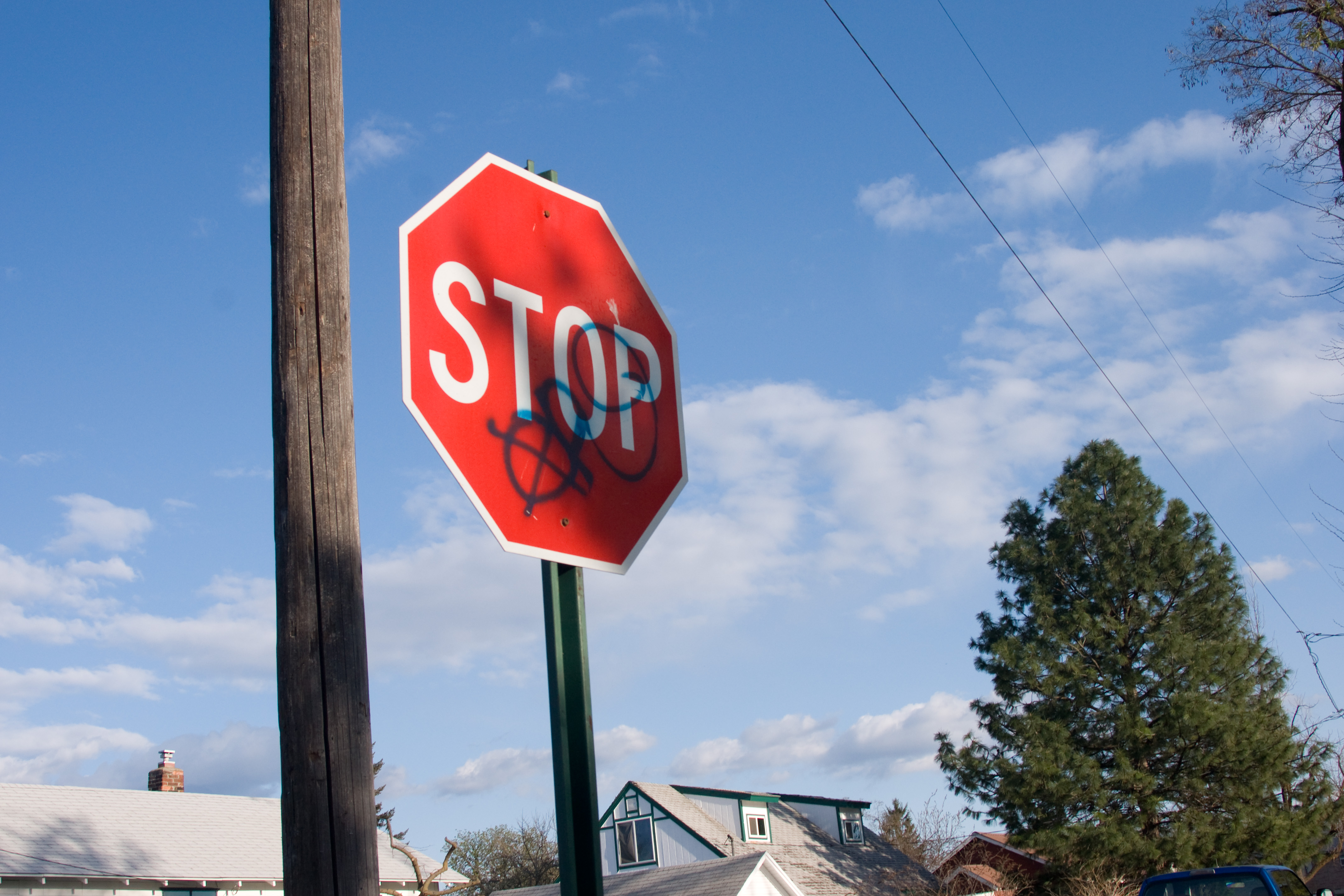
Gang symbols in Spokane, Washington, 2009

Graffiti is writing or drawings scribbled, scratched, or sprayed illicitly on a wall or other surface in a public place. Graffiti ranges from simple written words to elaborate wall paintings. Graffiti, consisting of the defacement of public spaces and buildings, remains a nuisance issue for cities.

In America, graffiti was used as a form of expression by political activists, and also by gangs such as the Savage Skulls, La Familia, and Savage Nomads to mark territory. In 1969, Herbert R. Kohl published an article titled "Names, Graffiti and Culture" in The Urban Review describing how New York youth tagged their neighborhoods with their names and street numbers going back to the early 1960s. Towards the end of the 1960s, the signatures—tags—of Philadelphia graffitists Cornbread, Cool Earl, and Sketch started to appear. By the early 1970s, the New York City subway was the center for various types of innovative graffiti. Bubble lettering held sway initially among graffitists from the Bronx, though the elaborate writing Tracy 168 dubbed "wildstyle" would come to define the art. The early trendsetters were joined in the 70s by graffitists like Dondi, Zephyr and Lady Pink.

Graffiti is one of the four main elements of hip-hop culture (along with rapping, DJing, and break dancing). The relationship between graffiti and hip hop culture arises both from early graffitists practicing other aspects of hip-hop, and its being practiced in areas where other elements of hip hop were evolving as art forms. By the mid-eighties, the form would move from the street to the art world. Jean-Michel Basquiat would abandon his SAMO tag for art galleries, and street art's connections to hip-hop would loosen. Occasional hip hop paeans to graffiti could still be heard throughout the nineties, however, in tracks like the Artifacts' "Wrong Side of Da Tracks", Qwel's "Brick Walls" and Aesop Rock's "No Jumper Cables".

== Origins ==
Early modernist graffiti can be dated back to boxcars in the early 1920s yet the graffiti movement seen in today's contemporary world really originated through the minds of political activists and gang members of the 1960s. The "pioneering era" of graffiti took place during the years 1969 through 1974. This time period was a time of change in popularity and style. New York City was the main hub of the art form. Graffitists during this time period sought to put as many markings up as possible around the city. This was the ultimate goal of exposure. The city produced one of the first graffiti writers to gain media attention in itself, TAKI 183. TAKI 183 was a youth from Washington Heights, Manhattan who worked as a foot messenger. His tag is a mixture of his name Demetrius (Demetraki), TAKI, and his street number, 183rd. Being a foot messenger, he was constantly on the subway and began to put up his tags along with his travels. This spawned a 1971 article in The New York Times titled "'Taki 183' Spawns Pen Pals". Julio 204 is also credited as an early graffitist, though not recognized at the time outside of the graffiti subculture.

Also taking place during this era was the movement from outside on the city streets to the subways. Graffiti also saw its first seeds of competition around this time. The goal of most graffitists at this point was having as many tags and bombs in as many places as possible. Graffitists began to break into subway yards in order to paint as many trains as they could with a lower risk, often creating larger elaborate pieces of art along the subway car sides.

By 1971 tags began to take on their signature calligraphic appearance because, due to the huge number of participants, each participant needed a way to distinguish themselves. Aside from the growing complexity and creativity, tags also began to grow in size and scale – for example, many graffitists had begun to increase letter size and line thickness, as well as outlining their tags. This gave birth to the so-called 'masterpiece' or 'piece' in 1972. Super Kool 223 is credited as being the first to do these pieces.

The use of designs such as polka dots, crosshatches, and checkers became increasingly popular. Spray paint use increased dramatically around this time as graffitists began to expand their work. "Top-to-bottoms", works which span the entire height of a subway car, made their first appearance around this time as well. The overall creativity and artistic maturation of this time period did not go unnoticed by the public – Hugo Martinez founded the United graffitists (UGA) in 1972. UGA consisted of many top graffitists of the time and aimed to present graffiti in an art gallery setting. By 1974, graffitists had begun to incorporate the use of scenery and cartoon characters into their work. TF5 (The Fabulous Five), was a crew which was known for their elaborately designed whole cars.:::

== New York City ==
=== Mid–1970s ===
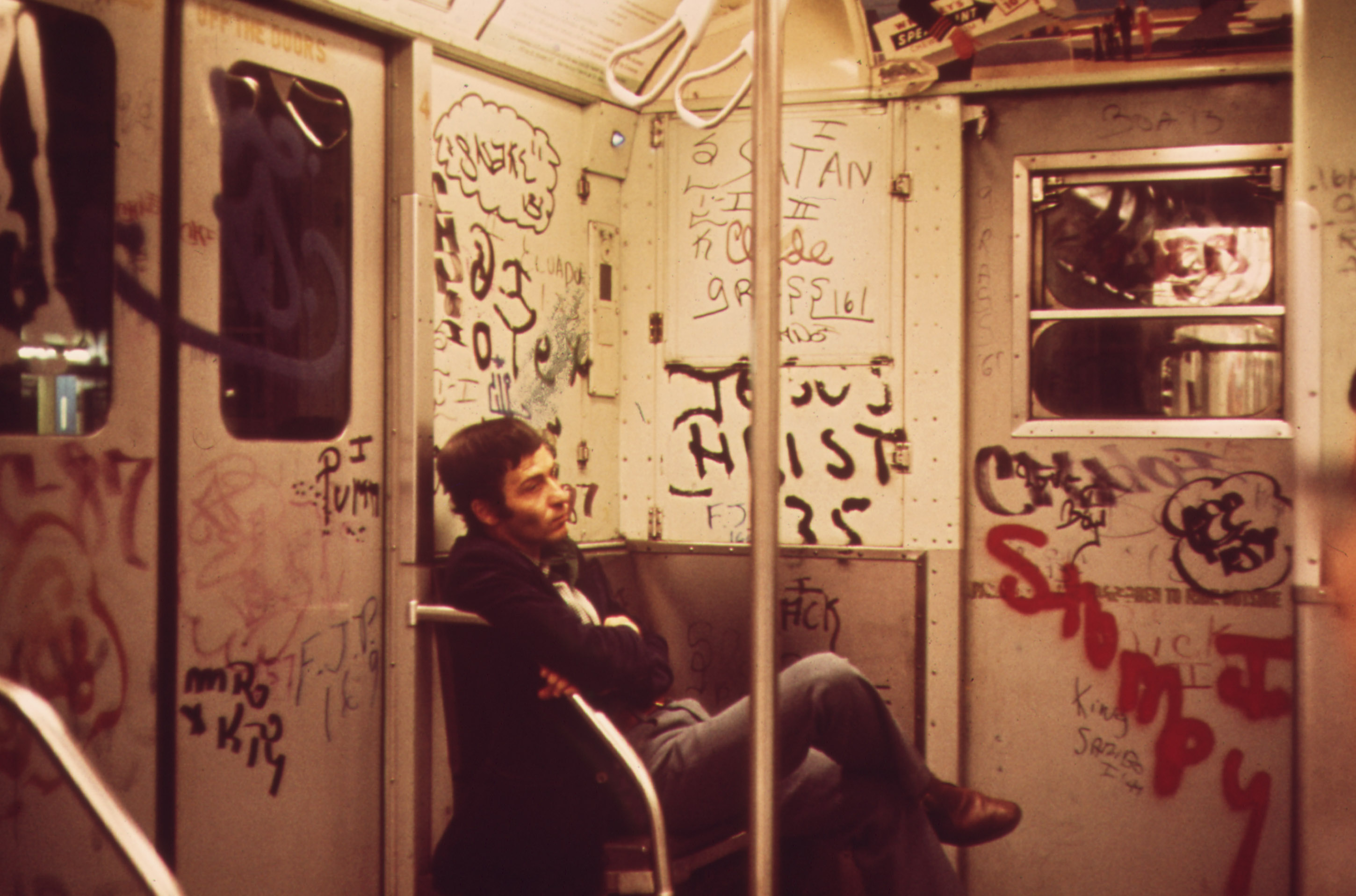
A heavily tagged subway car in New York City in 1973

By the mid-1970s, most standards had been set in graffiti writing and culture. The heaviest "bombing" in U.S. history took place in this period, partially because of the economic restraints on New York City, which limited its ability to combat this art form with graffiti removal programs or transit maintenance. "Top-to-bottoms" evolved to take up entire subway cars. A notable development was the "throw-up", which is more complex than simple "tagging" but not as intricate as a "piece". Not long after their introduction, throw-ups led to races to see who could do the largest number in the shortest time.

Graffiti writing was becoming very competitive and graffiti participants strove to go "all-city", or to have their names seen in all five boroughs. Eventually, the standards set in the early 1970s began to stagnate, and in the 1980s graffitists began to expand and change the subculture as described in the 1984 book Subway Art.

The late 1970s and early 1980s brought a new wave of creativity to the scene. As the influence of graffiti grew beyond the Bronx, a movement began with the encouragement of Friendly Freddie. Fab 5 Freddy (Fred Brathwaite) is another popular graffiti figure of this time, who started in a Brooklyn "wall-writing group". He notes how differences in spray technique and letters between Upper Manhattan and Brooklyn began to merge in the late 1970s: "out of that came 'Wild Style'". Fab 5 Freddy is often credited with helping to spread the influence of graffiti and rap music beyond its early foundations in the Bronx, and making links with the mostly white downtown art and music scenes. It was around this time that the established art world started becoming receptive to the graffiti culture for the first time since Hugo Martinez's Razor Gallery in the early 1970s.

It was also, however, the last wave of significant graffiti occurrences before the Transit Authority made graffiti eradication a priority. The Metropolitan Transportation Authority (MTA) began to repair yard fences and remove graffiti consistently. With the MTA consistently abating graffiti, many graffitists have quit applying graffiti on their property.

=== Decline ===
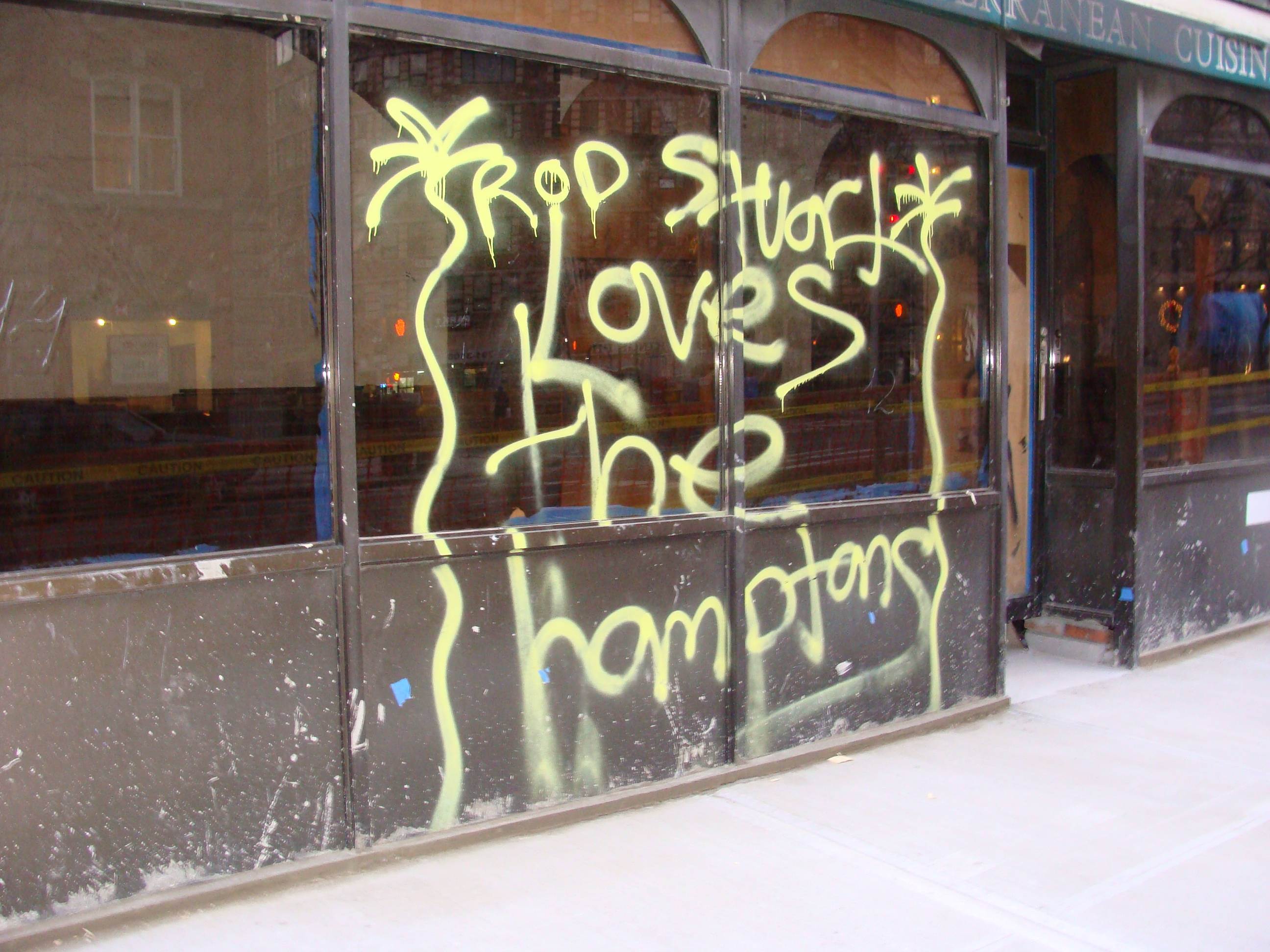
Storefront graffiti on a restaurant in TriBeCa in Manhattan

Just as the culture was spreading outside New York City and overseas, the cultural aspect of graffiti in New York City was said to be deteriorating almost to the point of extinction. The rapid decline in writing was due to several factors. The streets became more dangerous due to the burgeoning crack epidemic, legislation was underway to make penalties for graffiti vandalism more severe, and restrictions on paint sale and display made shoplifting more difficult. Above all, the MTA greatly increased their anti-graffiti budget. Many favored painting sites became heavily guarded, yards were patrolled, newer and better fences were erected, and the buffing of pieces was strong, heavy, and consistent. Stainless steel, to which paint adheres poorly (and was easily removed by the powerful cleaning solutions and spinning brushes used in automatic car washers at the yards) had also become the car body material of choice for new rolling stock, retiring hundreds of worn out carbon-steel bodied subway cars whose exteriors had made an ideal canvas for taggers. As a result of rolling stock being harder to paint, more graffitists went into the streets, which is now, along with commuter trains and box cars, the most prevalent form of writing.

Many graffitists, however, chose to see the new problems as a challenge rather than a reason to quit. A downside to these challenges was that they became very territorial of good spots, and strength and unity in numbers became increasingly important. Some of the mentionable graffitists from this era were Blade, Dondi, Min 1, Quik, Seen and Skeme. This was stated to be the end for the casual New York City Subway graffitists, and the years to follow would be populated by only what some consider the most "die-hard" graffitists. People often found that making graffiti around their local areas was an easy way to get caught so they traveled to different areas.

=== 1985–1989 ===
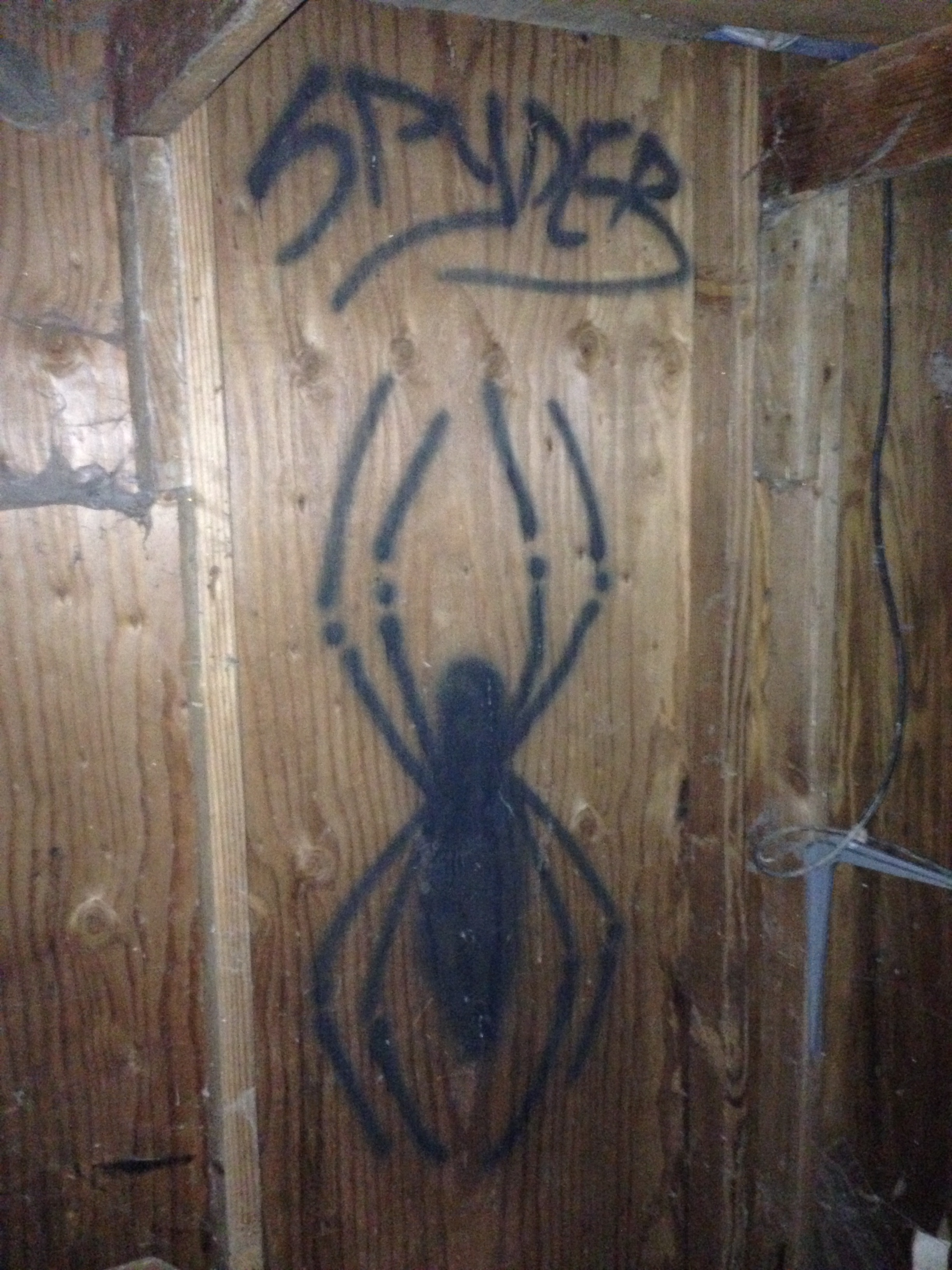
Street gang graffiti in Salem, Oregon in 1987

The years between 1985 and 1989 became known as the "die-hard" era. The last shot for the graffiti participants of this time was in the form of subway cars destined for the scrap yard. With the increased security, the culture had taken a step back. The previous elaborate "burners" on the outside of cars were now marred with simplistic marker tags which often soaked through the paint.

By mid-1986 the MTA and the CTA were winning their "war on graffiti", and the population of active graffitists diminished. As their population lowered so did the violence associated with graffiti crews and "bombing". Roof tops also were being the new billboards for some 1980s graffitists.

=== Clean Train movement ===
The current era in graffiti is characterized by a majority of participants moving from train carriages to "street galleries". The Clean Train Movement started in May 1989, when New York City attempted to remove all of the subway cars found with graffiti on them out of the transit system, as they brought in new graffiti-free rolling stock like the R62, R62A, R68, and R68A. Because of this, many graffiti vandals were unable to continue vandalizing them. Much controversy arose among the streets debating whether graffiti should be considered an actual form of art. Videograf Productions was the first graffiti video series to document the New York City's clean train movement.

Prior to the Clean Train Movement, the streets were largely left untouched not only in New York City but in other major American cities as well. After the transit company began diligently cleaning their trains, graffiti burst onto the streets of America to an unsuspecting, unappreciative public.

City officials elsewhere in the country smugly assumed that gang graffiti was a blight limited largely to the Big Apple.

No more. The stylised smears born in the South Bronx have spread across the country, covering buildings, bridges, and highways in every urban center. From Philadelphia to Santa Barbara, California, the annual costs of cleaning up after the underground artists are soaring into the billions.

During this period many graffitists had taken to displaying their works in galleries and owning their own studios. This practice started in the early 1980s with practitioners such as Jean-Michel Basquiat, who started out tagging locations with his moniker SAMO (Same Old Shit), and Keith Haring, who was also able to take his art into studio spaces.

In some cases, graffiti practitioners had achieved such elaborate graffiti, especially those done in memory of a deceased person, on storefront gates that shopkeepers have hesitated to cover them up. In the Bronx, after the death of rapper Big Pun, several murals were dedicated to his life, appearing virtually overnight; similar outpourings occurred after the deaths of The Notorious B.I.G., Tupac Shakur, Big L, and Jam Master Jay.

== St. Louis ==
A regularly scheduled event called Paint Louis is held annually in St. Louis. Paint Louis brings together graffitists from around the world to paint for two days as a celebration of the craft to paint on the longest continuous wall to make the "longest mural in the world".

== Regulations ==
The application of graffiti is illegal in many cities. Graffiti-making supplies may be regulated by local ordinances.

=== California ===
The state can choose to prosecute graffiti in California under the crime of "graffiti" or "vandalism."

The crime of "graffiti" is determined if the repair costs are less than $250. On a first offense, graffiti is charged as an infraction, which carries a fine of up to $1,000. On a second offense, graffiti is charged as a misdemeanor and carries a county jail sentence of up to 180 days and a minimum of 48 hours of community service, which includes trash collection or other types of work.

The crime of "vandalism" can be a misdemeanor or a felony. If the damage costs are less than $400 it is a misdemeanor, which carries up to 1 year in county jail and a maximum fine of $5,000. If it is classed as a felony, the damage is determined to be over $400, and the sentence can be 1-3 years in state prison and a fine up to $10,000. In some cases, fines can exceed $10,000 if the defacement is difficult to repair.

=== Oregon ===
The intentional application of graffiti is inclusive under the state statute ORS 164.354 - Criminal Mischief II without regard to amount of damage. It is punishable by up to one year of incarceration. Additionally, applying graffiti in which the damage exceeds $1,000 or on certain categories of property such as those owned by railroad is chargeable as a felony.

Additional restrictions may apply through locality specific ordinances that may apply to the acts of applying graffiti, commanding others to apply graffiti, causing graffiti to be applied, as well allowing graffiti to remain on surfaces within their respective jurisdictions.

For example, the city of Forest Grove code states that

5.160 Graffiti Prohibited (1) It is unlawful and a violation of this Ordinance for any person to place or put by any means, any drawing, inscription, figure, symbol, mark, or any type of graffiti on any public or private property without the consent of the owner, occupant or responsible party of the premises, or upon natural surfaces such as rocks, trees or any surface whatsoever. It is unlawful and a violation of this Ordinance for any person to solicit or command another person to apply graffiti or aid or abet another person in applying graffiti.

Beaverton's code includes to read regulations against the application as well as keeping of graffiti.

5.05.093 Graffiti. No person shall place, or cause to be placed, graffiti upon any property in the City of Beaverton. No owner or occupant of property shall allow graffiti to be on the property. Property upon which graffiti has been placed and has remained for more than seven (7) days is hereby declared to be a public nuisance, and shall be subject to the provisions of BC 5.05.230 relating to summary abatement.

== Public opinion ==
Graffiti proponents perceive it as a method of reclaiming public space or displaying an art form; their opponents regard it as a nuisance, or as costly vandalism requiring abatement. Graffiti can be viewed as a "quality of life" issue, and its detractors suggest that the presence of graffiti contributes to a general sense of squalor and a heightened fear of crime. Graffiti has a strong negative influence on property values and lowers the tax base, reducing the available funding for municipal services, such as schools, fire protection, and sanitation.

In 1984, the Philadelphia Anti-Graffiti Network (PAGN) was created to combat the city's growing concerns about gang-related graffiti. PAGN led to the creation of the Mural Arts Program, which replaced often-hit spots with elaborate, commissioned murals that were protected by a city ordinance, with fines and penalties for anyone caught defacing them.

Philadelphia's Broad-Ridge Spur also features a long-standing example of the art form at the Spring Garden to 8th Street station. While still existing, it has long been quarantined and features tags and murals that have existed for upwards of 15 years.

Advocates of the broken window theory believe that this sense of decay encourages further vandalism and promotes an environment leading to offenses that are more serious. Former New York City mayor Ed Koch's vigorous subscription to the broken window theory promoted the aggressive anti-graffiti campaign in New York City in the early 1980s, resulting in "the buff"; a chemical wash for trains that dissolved the paint. New York City has adopted a strenuous zero tolerance policy ever since. However, throughout the world, authorities often treat graffiti as a minor-nuisance crime, though with widely varying penalties. In New York City rooftops became the mainstream graffiti location after graffiti on trains died out.

In 1995 New York City mayor Rudolph Giuliani set up the Anti-Graffiti Task Force, a multi-agency initiative to combat the perceived problem of graffiti vandals in New York City. This began a crackdown on "quality of life crimes" throughout the city, and one of the largest anti-graffiti campaigns in U.S. history. That same year Title 10–117 of the New York Administrative Code banned the sale of aerosol spray-paint cans to children under 18. The law also requires that merchants who sell spray paint must either lock it in a case or display the cans behind a counter, out of reach of potential shoplifters. Violations of the city's anti-graffiti law carry fines of US$350 per incident.

On January 1, 2006, in New York City, legislation created by Councilmember Peter Vallone, Jr. attempted to make it illegal for a person under the age of 21 to possess spray paint or permanent markers. The law prompted outrage by fashion and media mogul Marc Ecko who sued Mayor Michael Bloomberg and Councilmember Vallone on behalf of art students and graffiti artists. On May 1, 2006, Judge George B. Daniels granted the plaintiffs' request for a preliminary injunction against the recent amendments to the anti-graffiti legislation, effectively prohibiting (on May 4) the New York Police Department from enforcing the restrictions. A similar measure was proposed in New Castle County, Delaware in April 2006 and passed into law as a county ordinance in May 2006.

Chicago's mayor, Richard M. Daley created the "Graffiti Blasters" to eliminate graffiti and gang-related vandalism. The bureau advertises free cleanup within 24 hours of a phone call. The bureau uses paints (compatible with the city's 'color scheme') and baking-soda-based solvents to remove some varieties of graffiti.

In 1992, an ordinance was passed in Chicago that bans the sale and possession of spray paint and certain types of etching equipment and markers. The law falls under Chapter 8-4: Public Peace & Welfare, Section 100: Vagrancy. The specific law (8-4-130) makes graffiti an offense with a fine of no less than US$500 per incident, surpassing the penalty for public drunkenness, peddling, or disrupting a religious service.

In 2005, the city of Pittsburgh implemented a customized database-driven graffiti tracking system to build evidence for prosecution of graffiti suspects by linking tags to instances of graffiti. One of the first suspects to be identified by the system as being responsible for significant graffiti vandalism was Daniel Montano, known as MFONE. He was dubbed "The King of Graffiti" for having tagged close to 200 buildings in the city, and was later sentenced to 2.5 to 5 years in prison.

Rapid City, South Dakota contains a section of the city known as Art Alley, a back alley in the downtown district between Main Street and Saint Joseph Street and stretching from 6th to 7th Street. It first began to properly form around 2005, and has expanded since. While graffiti is largely illegal in Rapid City and there are no ordinances condoning it, Art Alley is purposefully overlooked by law enforcement and clean up crews and relies on the community of artists and landowners to add to and maintain the space. The alley has become quite popular for tourists and has become a cultural center for the city.

The Chicago Transit Authority has been utilizing the civil court system to sue graffiti vandals or parents of juvenile vandals that have been caught to recover the clean-up costs. The CTA reported they experience about $1 million in graffiti related expenses annually.

== Comparison with street art ==
Typically, the term street art, or the more specific post-graffiti, is used to distinguish contemporary public-space artwork from territorial graffiti, vandalism, and corporate art. Some people consider street art a crime; others consider it a form of art. It is a borderline issue.

== Bibliography ==
- Glazer, Nathan (Winter 1979). "On subway graffiti in New York" (PDF). The Public Interest. pp. 3–11.
- "Time Collection: Graffiti". Time. Archived from the original on January 19, 2011.

== See also ==
- 34th Street Wall
- 5 Pointz
- Billboard Liberation Front
- Estria
- Freedom Tunnel
- HOPE Outdoor Gallery
- Kilroy was here
- Martha Cooper
- Mission School
- Paint Louis
- Piece by Piece
- Pink Lady
- Pray (graffiti)
- Style Wars
- Smear
- The Freedom Train (graffiti)
