= Mook =

Mook or Mooks may refer to:

== Places ==
- Mook, Iran (disambiguation)
- Mook, Kentucky, an unincorporated community, United States
- Mook en Middelaar, a municipality in the Netherlands

== Entertainment ==
- Mook (publishing), a portmanteau of magazine and book
- Mook Animation, a Japanese animation studio
- Mook, a playable character race in the Wizardry RPG series
- The Mooks, a gang in the City of Heroes MMORPG
- Mook (gaming), often synonymous with "mob", but generally used to refer to enemies specifically opposed to the player

== People ==
- Anne Lamy Mook (born 1947), American politician
- Hubertus van Mook (1894–1965), Dutch administrator in the East Indies
- Mook (Pittsburgh graffiti artist), American graffiti artist
- Mook (Portland graffiti artist), American graffiti artist
- Robby Mook (born 1979), American political strategist
- Theodore Mook (born 1953), American cellist
- Wim Mook (1932–2016), Dutch isotope physicist
- Worranit Thawornwong (born 1996), Thai actress better known as "Mook"

== Other uses ==
- Mooks clothing company, an Australian streetwear brand

== See also ==
- Mookie
- Muk (disambiguation)
- Massive open online course (MOOC), a higher education course
