= MUQ =

MUQ can refer to:

- Xong language, a language spoken in south-central China, by ISO 639 code
- Aerolineas Mundo, a defunct airline based in the Dominican Republic from 1986 to 1993; see List of defunct airlines of the Dominican Republic
- Muccan Station Airport, an airport in Muccan Station, Western Australia, Australia, by IATA code; see List of airports by IATA code: M

== See also ==
- $MUQ(p)$, a mathematical object associated with Brown-Peterson cohomology
- Muck (disambiguation)
- MUC (disambiguation)
- MUK (disambiguation)
