= SJK 171 =

American graffiti artist (born c.1957)

SJK 171 UGA
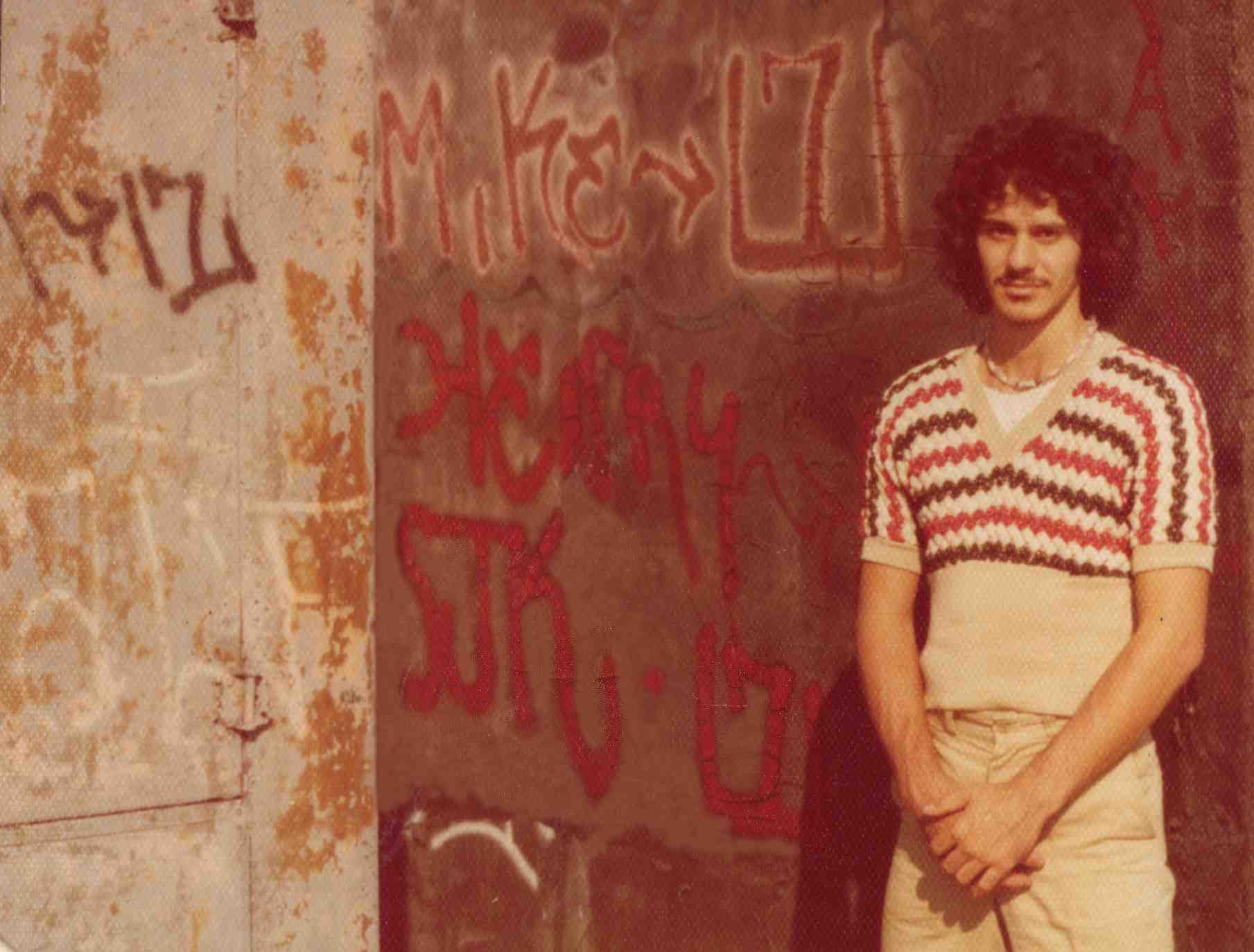
- Portrait of Kesoglides standing by his SJK 171 tag, 1972
- Born: Steve Kesoglides c.1957 Washington Heights, New York City
- Education: High School of Art and Design
- Known for: Pioneering the use of arrows in graffiti
- Movement: Graffiti
- Website: sjk171.com

SJK 171, a.k.a. Steve the Greek (born c.1957) is a New York City graffiti artist who was active during the late 1960s and 1970s. A native of Washington Heights, he was a founding member of United Graffiti Artists, one of the first professional graffiti collectives.

== History ==
SJK 171 attended the High School of Art and Design along with a number of other early graffiti artists, including Tracy 168 and Al Diaz, co-creator of SAMO, and began writing in 1968 under the name SJK 171. His work was the first triple outline, large colorful letters to appear on the 1 Line of the New York City Transit System. Some sources have recognized him as a graffiti pioneer and also for originating the "squiggly lines" style of outlining graffiti.

In early 1971, he began to use the "swiggly radiant energy lines" later popularized by Keith Haring. SJK 171 is also credited with pioneering the use of arrows in graffiti writing around this same time. In 1972, he was hired by the Joffrey Ballet to paint his designs, live, in the stage production of Twyla Tharp's ballet Deuce Coupe, along with other graffiti artists, including Stay High 149.

In 1973, SJK 171 was featured in a New York Magazine essay on graffiti art by Richard Goldstein.

=== Gallery and show appearances ===
1973: A collaborative mural bearing SJK 171's tag, along with those of PHASE 2 and a dozen other early graffiti artists, was the main attraction at a gallery show of graffiti art at Razor Gallery in SoHo. SJK 171 was also one of several graffiti writers featured in the backdrop design for the Joffery Ballet's production of Deuce Coupe.

2014: SJK 171's work is included in the permanent collection of The Museum of the City of New York.

2018-2019: SJK 171 was included in "Beyond the Streets", a street art exhibition displayed in Los Angeles and New York.

2025: SJK 171's work was featured in the exhibition "Gordon Matta-Clark: NYC Graffiti Archive 1972/3", March 20-May 17, 2025.

2025: SJK 171 spoke at the Whitney Museum of American Art on a panel with TAKI 183, FUTURA 2000, Michael Lawrence and MIKE 171 entitled Gordon Matta-Clark and NYC Graffiti Culture 1972-73.
