= Nancy Hernández =

Nancy Hernández may refer to:

- Nancy Hernandez (born c. 1945), American woman threatened with judicial forced sterilization
- Nancy Hernández López (born 1963), Costa Rican jurist
- Nancy "Pili" Hernandez (born 1980), American artist and activist
