= Indie184 =

American street artist

Indie 184
- Born: Soraya Marquez; 1980 (age 44–45); Río Piedras, Puerto Rico
- Known for: Feminist graffiti art
- Style: Wild-style, mixed media
- Movement: Graffiti
- Partner: Cope2

Soraya Marquez (born 1980), better known by her pseudonym Indie184, is an American street artist known for her New York feminist graffiti style infused with feminine icons such as hearts, stars and bubbles. Her current work is a mixed media style incorporating painting of past American stars, graffiti, and stencil art on canvas or wall murals. Indie’s art is inspired by old school New York graffiti artists such as Seen, LEE, West, Serve, and Cope2.

Marquez owns a streetwear brand, Kweens Destroy. Her graffiti art has been featured in the video game Grand Theft Auto IV. In 2013, she was commissioned by MAC Cosmetics to create a makeup style purse. Marquez also worked as Rommel London's Chief Artistic Officer in partnership on Rimmel's “The Art of Beauty Campaign.” Her art has been featured in New York City's El Museo del Barrio and the Volklingen Ironworks Museum in Saarbrücken, Germany.

== Biography ==
Marquez was born in Rio Piedras, Puerto Rico, and is of Dominican descent. She was raised in New York City by a single mother and has four siblings. Marquez in various New York City suburbs until her family settled in the Washington Heights borough after the death of her stepfather.

Marquez's graffiti started in her teenage years in Washington Heights, where she would play basketball and draw on the walls. She studied marketing in college, but did not finish her degree.

Marquez's pseudonym Indie184 his derived from her favorite film franchise, Indiana Jones, and 184th Street, where she grew up in Manhattan.

== Notable work ==
- Go Hard, Indie's first solo exhibit featuring
  - “Don’t Get it Twisted”
  - “Own Your Power”
- MAC Cosmetics Bag 1 and Bag 2
