= STRAAT Museum =

Street art museum in Amsterdam, Netherlands

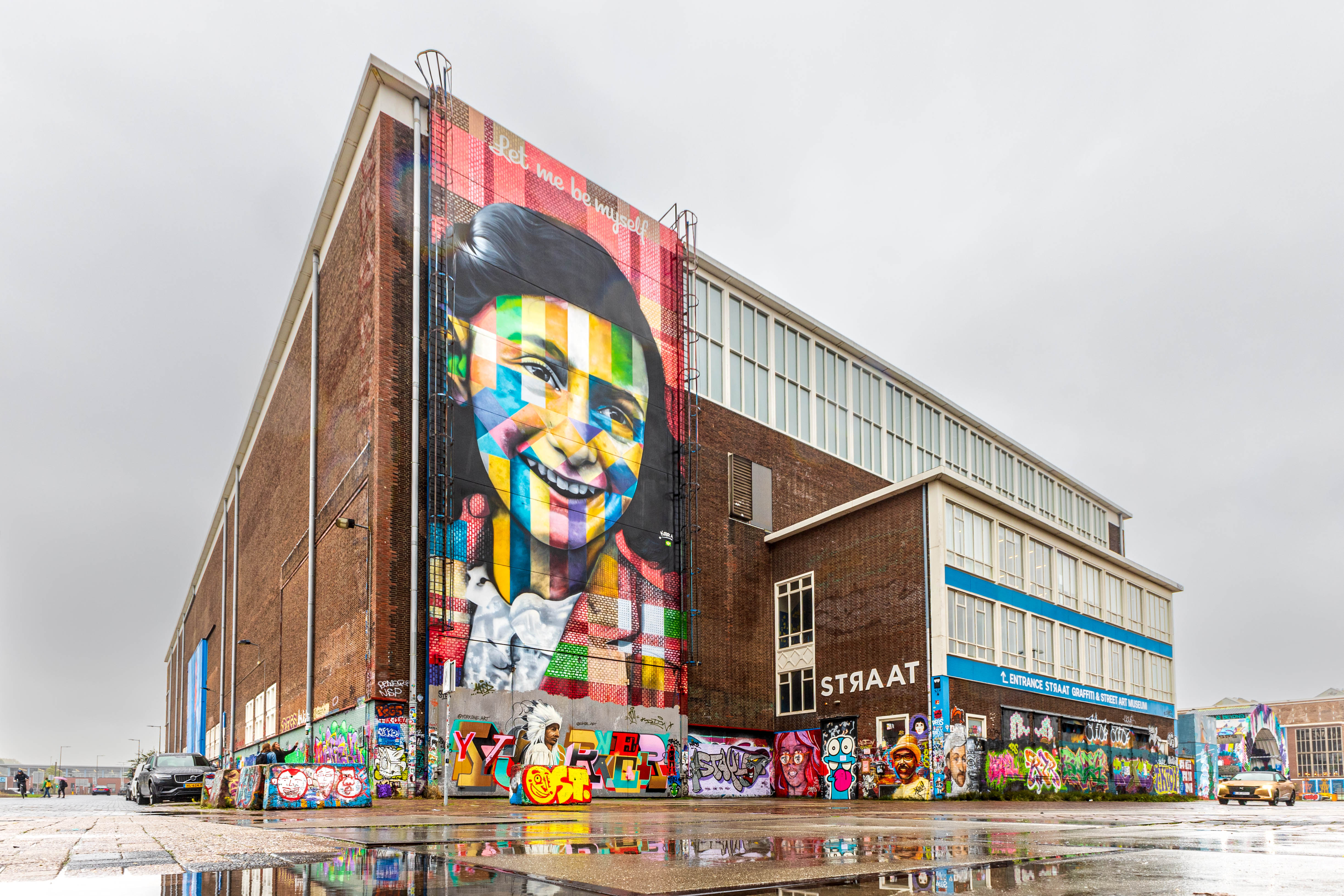
- Main facade
- Established: October 9, 2020
- Location: NDSM-plein 1, 1033 WC Amsterdam, Netherlands
- Coordinates: 52°24′7″N 4°53′38″E
- Type: Street art
- Visitors: 220,000 (2024)
- Public transit access: Bus: 35, 36, 391, 394
- Website: straatmuseum.com
- Area: 86,000 sq ft (8,000 m^{2})

The STRAAT Museum is an art museum of street art and graffiti located in the NDSM neighborhood of Amsterdam, Netherlands.

Opened on October 9, 2020, its 86,000-square-foot (8,000 m^{2}) space contains a permanent exhibition with more than 180 works from over 170 artists, as well as a mezzanine gallery that houses temporary exhibitions by up-and-coming artists. The façade and exterior walls also features several murals, with the most prominent being a 2016 depiction of Anne Frank by Brazilian artist Eduardo Kobra.

In 2024 the museum had an estimated 220,000 visitors.

== History ==
The space housing the museum is a former welding warehouse later repurposed to contain part of the IJ-hallen, the largest flea market in Europe.

Owner Peter Hoogerwerf reached out to curator David Roos (who would later become Head Curator of the museum) to help decorate, bringing inside some of the street art adorning the NDSM. The collection grew rapidly, and at the end of 2015 the two decided to turn the whole space into a museum. After a few slowdowns, like a leaking roof deemed unsafe and the start of the COVID-19 pandemic, the museum opened on October 9, 2020.

== Collection ==
The museum houses more than 180 works from over 170 artists, most of which are new artworks that were created onsite.

The collection includes work from notable street artists such as:

- Eduardo Kobra
- Cornbread
- SJK 171
- Buff Monster
- Royyal Dog
- Shepard Fairey
- Guido van Helten
- Julio 204
- Inkie
