= Tellas (artist) =

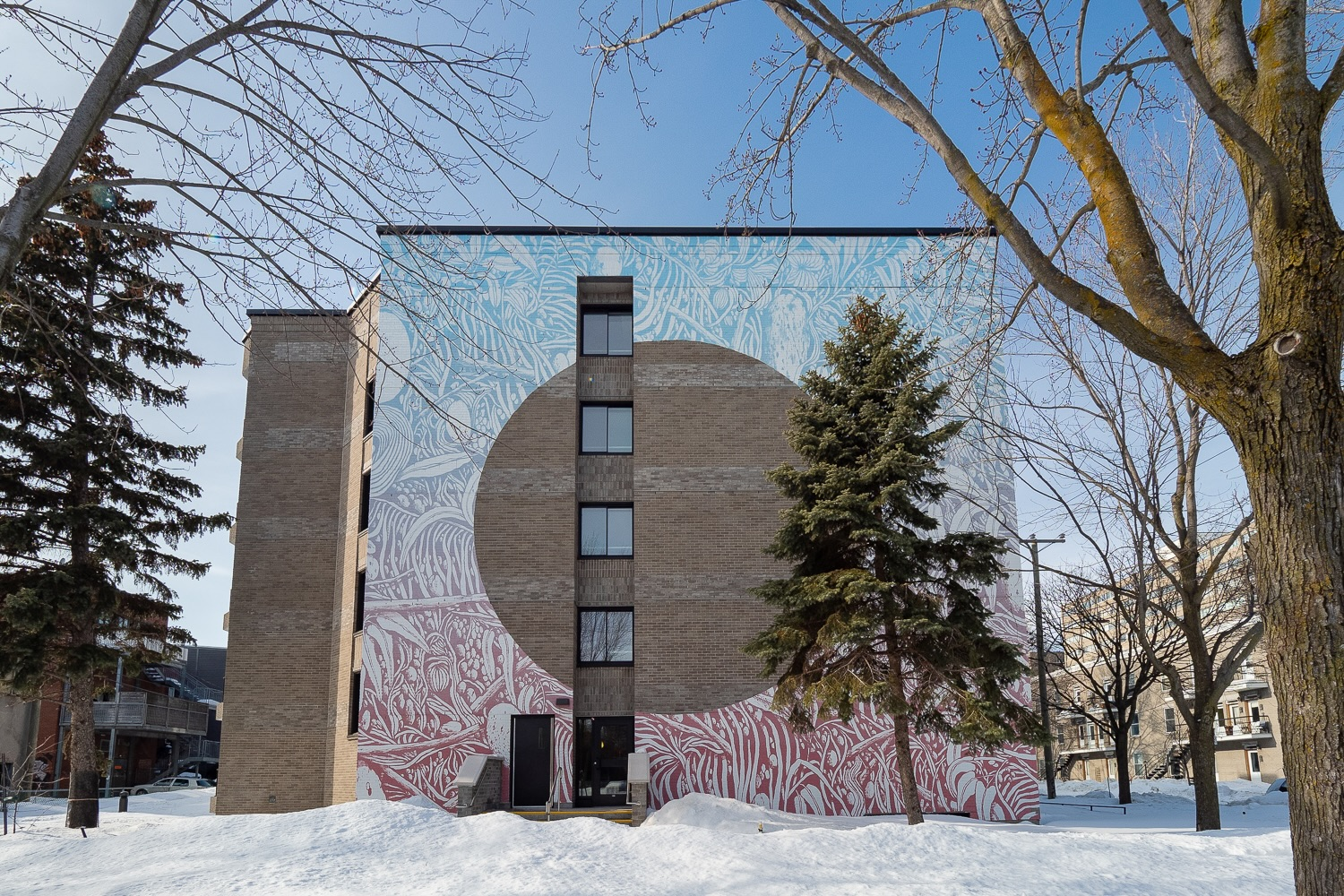
TELLAS "Circle of seasons", Montreal, Canada 2020

Fabio Schirru, known professionally as Tellas, is an Italian visual artist born in 1985 in Cagliari, Sardinia. He studied at the Academy of Fine Arts in Bologna. His work is characterized by a personal and intimate vision of natural landscapes, often exploring non-urban aesthetics through abstract compositions.

== Career ==
Tellas has participated in numerous international art events. In 2013, he contributed to the La Tour Paris Project, an innovative contemporary art projects globally. The following year, he took part in Artmossphere, the first Street Art Biennale in Moscow, which featured 70 artists from around the world

In 2015, Tellas was featured in The Urban Contemporary Art Guide, edited by Graffiti Art Magazine, ranking among the world's top 100 emerging artists. That same year, he completed an extensive public artwork in Cagliari, which was designated the Italian Capital of Culture at the time. He also participated in the sixth edition of Rome's Outdoor Festival, titled "Here, Now," and held a solo exhibition, "Clima Estremo," at Wunderkammern Gallery in Rome.

In 2016, Tellas created significant public artworks in Madrid, Helsinki, and Albany. His work has been showcased in various exhibitions, including "This Quiet, Harsh Land" at Mini Galerie in Amsterdam, where he explored the unspoiled landscapes of Sardinia through abstract motifs. In 2021, Tellas was prominently featured in the STRAAT Museum's exhibition "Out There Somewhere," co-curated by The Jaunt.

== Press editions ==
In 2014, The Huffington Post included Tellas in its list of the 25 most interesting street artists worldwide. His work has also been featured in The Urban Contemporary Art Guide by Graffiti Art Magazine, highlighting his prominence in the contemporary art scene.
