= Artists4Israel =

Pro-Israel advocacy organization

Artists4Israel (a.k.a. A4I) is a non-profit pro-Israel advocacy organization that works through artists in all artistic media to educate people worldwide about Israel. Artists4Israel is managed by Executive Director Craig Dershowitz.

== History ==
The organization participated in Art Basel Miami 2012 with its "Heroes in Distress" Exhibit at the Overture/Scope art fair and at NAC Gallery's LMNT art fair, showcasing art by Andalucian photorealistic graffiti artist Belin and artist Army of One. Artists 4 Israel also showcased its Bomb Shelter Museum at the Yard, an open-air art installation in Wynnewood, with more than 5,000 visitors during Art Basel Miami 2012. The Yard featured live graffiti by more than 20 invited graffiti artists, fashion pieces designed specifically for Artists4Israel by Chromat.

The organization had a show at the Vered Gallery in East Hampton in 2010.

The group drew media attention in March, 2011 by setting up a "Bomb Shelter Museum of Living History" in New York's Washington Square Park. The walls were decorated by New York area graffiti artists including Cope2 in an effort to draw attention to the targeting of Israeli civilians by terrorists groups based in Hamas-controlled Gaza. The Bomb Shelter Museum was also shown at Baruch College
