= Videograf Productions =

- Type: Video production company
- Industry: Video production
- Genre: Graffiti culture documentation
- Founded: 1989
- Founders: Carl Weston, Colin "KoolSpin" Turner
- Headquarters: New York City, New York, U.S.,
- Key people: William "Nic One" Green: Sacha Jenkins
- Services: Video production and video distribution

Videograf Productions is an underground video magazine series that documents the U.S. graffiti subculture.

== History ==
Videograf was founded in 1989 by two former New York city graffiti writers Carl Weston and Colin "KoolSpin" Turner. The inspiration for the Videograf series came during the summer of 1988, from the graffiti zine movement. It was publications like New York City's "International Graffiti Times" published by David Schmidlapp and Phase2 and the first color graffiti zine from Los Angeles - "Can Control Magazine" published by Power that planted the idea of doing a videotape version of a fan zine. By February 1989 Videograf issue one was in full production. By the summer of 1989, photographer and graffiti artist William "Nic One" Green joined the Videograf team as a producer. A year later, the future cofounder of Egotrip magazine, writer and television producer Sacha Jenkins joined Videograf as well. Videograf Productions operated out of Henry Chalfant's studio at 64 Grand Street for around 3 years before moving to Greenpoint Brooklyn.

== Overview ==
Videograf Productions was the first group to produce a recurring video series on the graffiti scene. At the time, most films regarding graffiti were traditional documentaries. Videograf Productions used a video magazine format to profile graffiti artists and graffiti bombers. The Videograf series was unusual in that it was produced by active and former graffiti writers. At the time, most people documenting urban culture tended to be from outside the culture. The Videograf series wasn't neutral in how it covered graffiti; it as pro-graffiti from the very start. Weston documented the new clean train movement that had started in New York City after the last train with graffiti was pulled from service in April 1989. Graffiti artists and bombers like Ven, Ket and others decided to add graffiti back to the New York City transit system. The number one thing that would get Videograf Productions into legal conflicts with the New York City Police Department was the inclusion of clean train bombing.

Videograf Productions has produced and distributed over 20 graffiti videos. The original Videograf video series, and later the Graf Core and OverSpray series, included interviews with well known graffiti artists such as Zephyr, PHASE 2, Lee Quiñones, Pjay, Ket, Ghost, JA, Death149, Risk, Cope2, Sharp, Reas, Serve, Web, Espo, Kaws, Dash "Sace" Snow and Dream.

== Police harassment, arrest and civil rights lawsuit ==
On May 26, 2000 the Police Department's Bronx Vandal Squad unit executed a search warrant on Videograf Productions as they were prepping the release of their newest video titled Graf Core 2000. This police action and the confiscation of Videograf Productions entire videotape archive would delay Graf Core 2000 from being released for almost 4 years. A few months after the warrant was executed, the Bronx Vandal Squad arrested William Green and Weston for blurring an image used in the video Graf Core 1.0. The official charge was hindering a criminal investigation, but it was dropped by the judge the next day.

Videograf Productions hired ACLU's Norman Siegel and later Earl Ward to represent them in a civil rights lawsuit against the City of New York. Weston went to the Bronx Vandal Squad headquarters a few months after the first search warrant in an attempt to get an on camera interview with anyone from the Vandal Squad. Weston attempted to interview officer Joseph "Joe Blow" Rivera, but the interview was allegedly unsuccessful. didn't go very well. The day after the interview attempt, the Bronx Vandal Squad executed a second search warrant. Weston stated that he felt the second warrant was retaliation for videotaping Joseph "Joe Blow" Rivera's face. Four years later, the city settled out of court with Videograf Productions.

== Videography ==
Title	Year	Featured artists / subjects
Videograf Issue #1	1989	Phase 2, Henry Chalfant, William "Nic One" Green, Priz-One, Sein5, Visim, Death149
Videograf Issue #2	1990	JA, King Bee, Desh, Scope, Mars, Take5, Bom5, FuzzOne, Death149
Videograf Issue #3	1991	Ket, Slick, Dream, Power, Risk, Charlie
Videograf Issue #4	1991	MQ, King Bee, Vase, Lady Di
Videograf Issue #5	1992	Ghost, Ket, Zeno, Bruz, Free5, Gaze, Emit, Imok Crew
Videograf Issue #6	1992	Cope2, Dero & Med, Ryze, Shone, Web TC5, Asis, Kaves, Lordz of Brooklyn
Videograf Issue #7	1993	KAWS, Pheen, Massive, Sub, Emit, Snow, Pkay, TDee
Videograf Issue #8	1993	Dream, King 157, Just, Tyke, Haze, AWR Crew, Greed, Waqs (Cortes)
Videograf Issue #9	1994	Cost, Set, Serve, Louie 167, Zephyr, Giz, Kech, Yes2
Out Ta Bomb Issue #1	1994	Ae.One, Web 113, Joust, Ryno
Out Ta Bomb Issue #2	1995	AKS
Graf Core 1.0	1999	Espo, Ader, Keeps, Scant
Graf Core 2000	2004	Cope2, Nace, Chip, Semz, Spek BTC, Dash Snow, Year
OverSpray 1.0	2005	—
Videograf 10 – 20th Anniversary DVD	2010	Lee Quiñones, Queen Andrea, Acet, Siek FLYID
