= Mookie =

Mookie, Mooki or Mooky may refer to:

== People ==
- Mookie Betts (born 1992), American Major League Baseball player
- Michael Blaiklock (born 1969), American actor and writer
- Mookie Blaylock (born 1967), American former National Basketball Association player
- Mooky Greidinger (born 1952), Israeli businessman, CEO of Cineworld
- Shmuel Katz (politician) (1914–2008), Israeli writer, historian and journalist, Zionist and member of Irgun, nicknamed "Mooki"
- Derrell Mitchell (born 1971), American football coach and player
- Michael Moore (offensive lineman) (born 1976), American football player
- Mookie Salaam (born 1990), American sprinter
- Mookie Singerman, member of the band Genghis Tron
- Michael Terracciano, webcomic artist and author
- Darryl Watkins (born 1984), American basketball player
- Mookie Wilson (born 1956), American baseball player
- Thabo Mooki (born 1974), South African footballer
- Mooky the Clown, stage name of Laci Endresz Jr. who performs at Blackpool Tower Circus
- Mooky, stage name of Mundzir Abdul Latif, lead singer of the band One Buck Short
- Mooki (singer) (born 1975), Israeli singer

== Other uses ==
- Mooki River, New South Wales, Australia
- Mookie, a fictional character in the film Do the Right Thing, played by Spike Lee

== See also ==
- Mook (disambiguation)
