= MFONE =

American graffiti artist

Daniel Montano
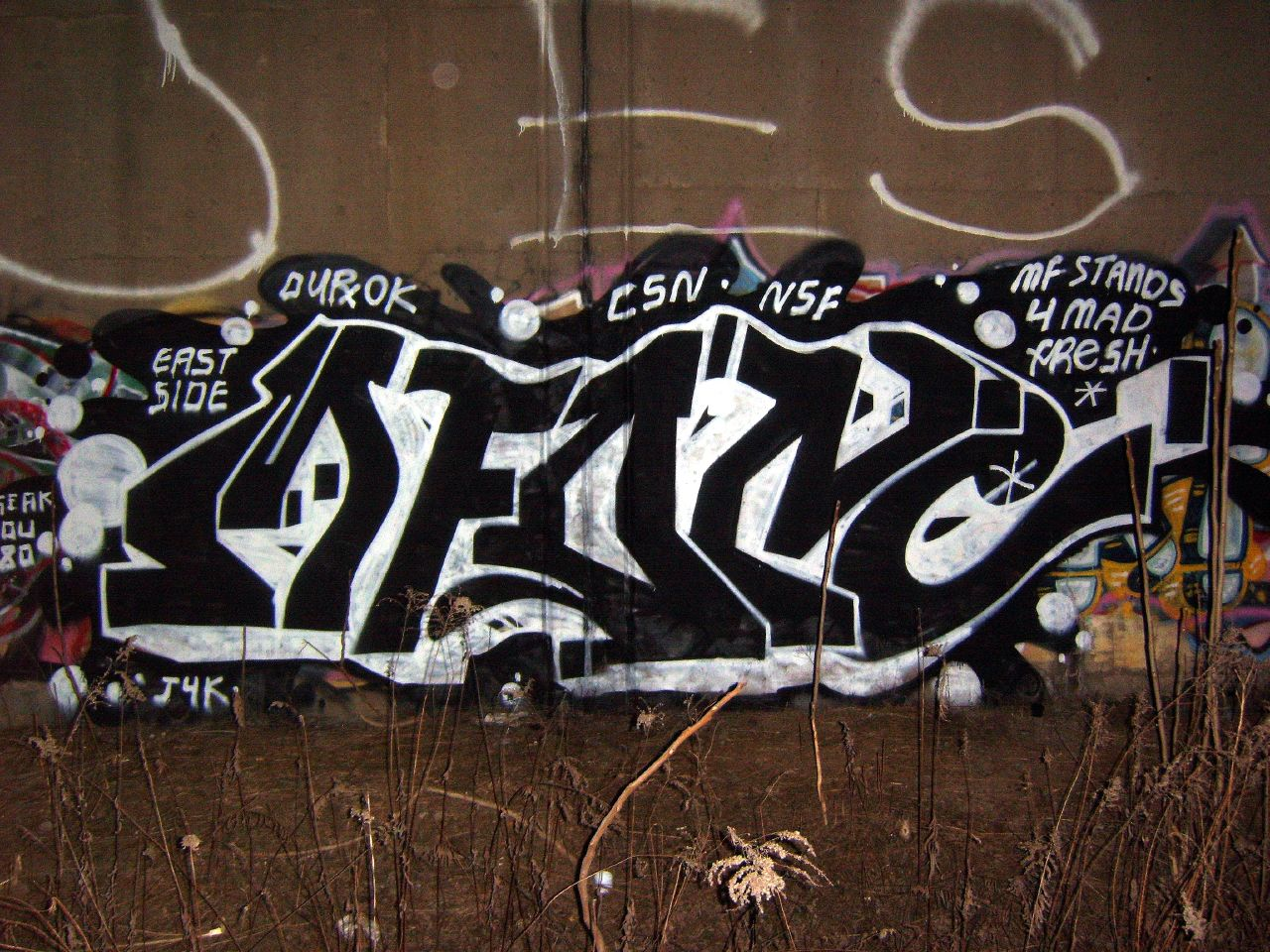
- A graffiti mural by MFONE along the Eliza Furnace Trail (Three Rivers Heritage Trail) stating that "MF STANDS FOR MAD FRESH".
- Born: 1985–1986
- Died: June 10, 2017; Highland Park, Pennsylvania
- Cause of death: Heroin overdose
- Body discovered: his home
- Other name: MFONE

MFONE was the tag of Daniel Montano. He was an American best known for his graffiti who died on June 10, 2017, from a heroin overdose at the age of 31. He had been using Vicodin, Xanax, cocaine, heroin and marijuana for 15 years. He was active in Pittsburgh in the mid and late 2000s. At the peak of his tagging activity, he was considered to be "the most notorious tagger in (Pittsburgh) history." According to the police, he was the most prolific graffiti writer in the city's history, having replaced Mook in local graffiti folklore. His graffiti activities are alleged to have caused up to $713,801 in damage.

A member of the Pittsburgh Police's Graffiti Task Force said "Montano has real talent; he's an artist. These other guys are copycats. But they're all vandals." MFONE's artistry was so well-respected that subsequent taggers have been referred to in the media as "no Daniel Montano."

== Personal life ==
His father was an engineer who emigrated from Colombia and his mother was a nurse. He attended Liberty Elementary School, the Pittsburgh Creative and Performing Arts School, graduating from Peabody High School. He was expelled from CAPA for vandalizing the building across from the school he attended. Following graduation, he studied at Art Institute of San Francisco. He remained at the Art Institute for a few years before dropping out.

== 2005 Legal problems ==
In August 2005, Montano was caught in East Liberty. During his subsequent 2006 preliminary hearing, Judge John A. Zottola felt that Montano showed a general attitude of disrespect, and sent him to Allegheny County Jail for 5 days before resuming proceedings. After entering a general guilty plea for three graffiti sites, Montaro received no probation and was ordered to pay restitution of $1,001 (in addition to the 5 days previously spent in jail). The sentence was denounced as too lenient by local community leaders who lived in areas targeted by his graffiti, including Schenley Farms Neighborhood Block Watch network and Lawrenceville United."

== Subsequent arrests and Mattress Factory installation ==
On March 17, 2007, he was arrested after an intensive police investigation, totaling over 100 police hours, that had been possible only because of changes in police tactics that included extensive tracking of graffiti in a police database. At the time, it was described as the "largest graffiti bust in U.S. history," with the damages then-calculated as $560,764.50

In spite of the opinion among property owners and community groups, Montano was developing "nascent esteem in the art world." In 2007, he was commissioned to produce installation art at the Mattress Factory, a contemporary art museum in Pittsburgh. His work, guest-curated by Heather Pesanti, an assistant curator of contemporary art at the Carnegie Museum of Art, was "a boy's room with a twin bed, a dresser, shelves and a traffic light. On the wall, mixed-media collages and scrawled messages form a continuous row. He brought the furniture from home and slept in his exhibit for the better part of two weeks while installing it"; the book Goodnight Moon was placed on the dresser. During the construction of the work, he slept on the bed "making himself as much a part of the show as his personal effects." In spite of objections to his appearance at the museum as the result of his graffiti, the facility supported Daniel Montano, with Michael Olijnyk, the in-house curator, saying "It's hard to see the artistic value in something that you have to have removed...That's a natural conflict. But at the Mattress Factory, we're just about the art. Everyone who comes here comes here because we find their work interesting. If the only stuff he did was on the street, he wouldn't be in the Mattress Factory."

On January 17, 2008, two days before the work's opening, he turned himself in to police after being charged with more counts of criminal mischief related to graffiti. He was sentenced to 2 1/2 to 5 years in prison, probation, community service, and a restitution of $232,000.

In July 2016, Montano was charged with 40 counts of criminal mischief for newly created graffiti. Using a search warrant, police had found 197 cans of spray paint, books and stickers of graffiti, yellow lined paper with the graffiti tag “Israel” and other evidence at his home. In addition, police stated that they had observed pictures of Montano with new graffiti tags on his Facebook page. However, Montano was acquitted of all charges in May 2017 due to lack of evidence.
