= Rogers Middle School for the Creative and Performing Arts =

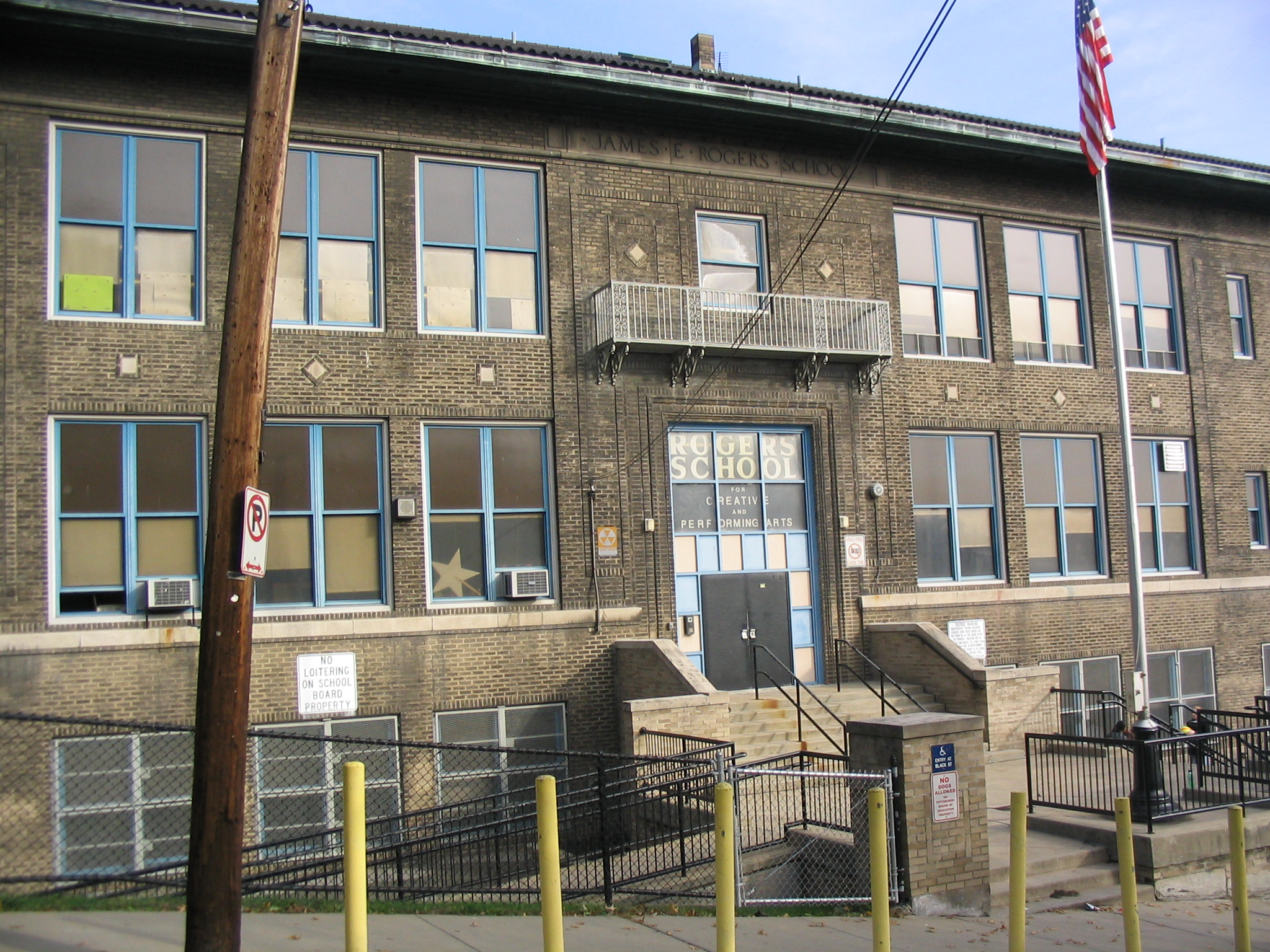

Location
- 5525 Columbo Street; Pittsburgh PA 15206; United States; 40.469019°N 79.930577°W

Information
- Type: Public
- Motto: Believe, Work to Achieve, and Succeed
- Established: September 1979
- School district: Pittsburgh Public Schools
- Principal: Dr. Ronald Jones
- Staff: 13
- Faculty: 40
- Grades: 6–8
- Campus type: Urban
- Colors: Blue and Yellow/Gold
- Athletics conference: PIAA District 8
- Mascot: Wolverine
- Representative: Thomas Sumpter
- Website: Rogers CAPA Middle School

Pittsburgh Landmark – PHLF
- Designated: 2002

Rogers Middle School for the Creative and Performing Arts (Rogers CAPA) was an arts magnet school located in Garfield, near East Liberty, and Highland Park neighborhoods of Pittsburgh, Pennsylvania. The school offered nine Arts majors: Creative Writing, Dance, Drama, Instrumental, Multimedia, Piano, Stagecraft, Visual Arts, and Vocal.

Admission was by portfolio or audition. Academic courses included Communications, Computers, Health, Library, Mathematics, Physical Education, Science, Social Studies, and Spanish.

Rogers CAPA was one of ten middle schools in the Pittsburgh Public Schools. In 2005 it was ranked 111th of 500 middle schools in the state of Pennsylvania.

In June 2009, the building was closed and the program was merged into the Pittsburgh Creative and Performing Arts School.

== History ==
As part of the court-mandated desegregation plan, the Gladstone School for the Creative and Performing Arts opened in September 1979 for grades 4–8. One of the plan's objectives was to create a unique program that would attract a population that would be drawn from all neighborhoods in the city. Eventually, a process of application and audition was instituted, which has served as a highly successful method of admission to the school.

In September 1980, the program was moved to its present location in the Rogers building and changed to its current format of grades 6–8. A major addition to the program was the hiring of an adjunct teaching staff of artists and performers with a high level of expertise. In its lifetime the school has served over 8000 students by developing their artistic and academic talents.

One of the hallmarks of Rogers School has been the institution of school-wide interdisciplinary units that unite academic and arts subjects, thus enriching and extending student learning. Throughout the years, units have included Shakespeare, the Civil War, Broadway musicals, and the Shapers of History. All arts staff involve their students in the production of stage presentation, and the academic staff creates specific lesson plans that relate to the theme and support the creation of the stage production.

In 1992, the entire staff and student body collaborated with the Pittsburgh Opera in the student-centered production of the opera The Pied Piper of Hamelin. Shadowing the professionals, students wrote copy for the print and electronic media, designed the program cover, conducted the orchestra though some rehearsals, interviewed the principal actors and wrote biographies, choreographed dance sequences, and designed and created costumes worn during the production.

Community partners and supporters included the Pittsburgh Ballet Theatre, the Dance Alloy, the Pittsburgh Symphony Orchestra, Pittsburgh Citiparks, the Pittsburgh Zoo & PPG Aquarium, the Carnegie Museums of Pittsburgh, and the Pittsburgh Opera.

== Campus ==
The building housing the current Middle School CAPA program was named for James E. Rogers, a member of the Hiland Sub-District School Board for twenty years. It was built in 1915 and had 742 students enrolled that year, by 1953 the enrollment had increased to 900 students. In 1980 the school was closed, and reopened in 1982 for the current CAPA program.

In 2002 the building was designated a Historic Landmark by the Pittsburgh History and Landmarks Foundation.

== Students ==
As of October 1, 2007, the student enrollment of 315 had the following demographics:

Race	Number	Percent
White American	156	49.52%
African American	133	42.22%
Asian American	3	0.95%
Hispanic	3	0.95%
Multiracial	20	6.35%
American Indian	0	0.00%
Sex	Number	Percent
Male	92	29.21%
Female	223	70.79%

== Extracurricular activities ==
- African American History Bowl
- book club
- National Junior Honor Society (NJHS)
- Pennsylvania Junior Academy of Science (PJAS)
- Rogers CAPA PSCC
- Rogers CAPA Sports Teams
- Students for Justice
- Think-a-Thon
- Tri-M
- Yearbook club

== Relocation ==
When Superintendent Mark Roosevelt announced his right-sizing plan on November 9, 2005, it included the relocation of Rogers CAPA to the Baxter Elementary building formerly occupied by CAPA High. Due to the negative response of the students, parents and faculty, this plan was dropped in the final right-sizing plan of February 28, 2006.

At a community meeting on March 28, 2006, Superintendent Roosevelt announced plans to form a committee to find and recommend a suitable destination for relocation. The committee, formed of parents, teachers, administrators and community members, first met on July 20, 2006 and made a final recommendation to the Superintendent on October 19, 2006. On November 1, Roosevelt presented to the Board of Education the committee's recommendation to move the CAPA Middle School program into the recently closed Milliones Middle School building. 40.4497°N 79.9625°W

On December 19, 2006 the Board of Education approved a contract with Graves Architects, Inc. "to provide architectural services for interior renovations and theatre/classroom addition to Milliones facility as outlined in the Request for Proposals prepared by the Facilities Division, for the relocation of Rogers CAPA, and as outlined in the Consultant's proposal of December 14, 2006."

At the Business/Finance Committee meeting on February 5, 2007, the Milliones Building Reuse Committee, created at the request of the Board, recommended in addition to moving the CAPA Middle School program there, to also move the K-8 program currently in the Vann Elementary building into Milliones as well. This plan would save $3.5 million from the current capital budget by expanding the needed addition to Milliones for the CAPA program by $1.5 million and eliminating the $5 million expansion to Vann.

On February 20, 2007, the Board of Directors passed a resolution at the Legislative meeting which matched the recommendation of the Milliones Building Reuse Committee.

The Pittsburgh City Council approved Conditional Use Zoning for Milliones Middle School on August 13, 2007, allowing the extension and interior renovations.

The current plan includes a 2½-story, 40,000-square-foot (3,700 m^{2}) addition on the eastern side of the building for use as an Arts Complex. It will include a Theater for ≈500, Art, Drama and Music classrooms, studios and rehearsal areas, as well as a stagecraft shop and costume design studio. The construction is expected to be completed in time for the schools to move in at the start of the 2008–09 school year in August 2008.
