= Nancy "Pili" Hernandez =

Irish interdisciplinary artist and activist

Nancy "Pili" Hernandez (born 1980) is an American interdisciplinary artist and activist. Her art often portrays climate injustices, with a key topic being water pollution. Her artwork is intended to promote changes in climate policy, and spread awareness about climate change.

== Biography ==
Hernandez was born in Pittsburg, California, in 1980. Her father is Chicano and her mother is Irish. Hernandez's early life was heavily influenced by the art that was around her, noting she believed murals were a normal part of each city. As a high school student, she painted one of her first murals advocating for environmental justice. Once she left California, she observed that murals served as a connector between cities, as she viewed the cultural contrasts between cities in which murals were prohibited and cities in which murals were encouraged.

Hernandez received an Associate of Arts degree in 2003 from the City College of San Francisco; she later transferred to San Francisco State University where she graduated with a bachelors degree in La Raza studies, and a minor in art education.

After graduating from San Francisco State University, Hernandez worked as a program manager for the non-profit Homey from 2005 to 2009. For Homey, she created curriculum for ethnic and art classes, taught these classes, and ran community-building initiatives for at-risk youth at San Francisco Mission District High Schools. Hernandez taught art classes at the June Jordan School for Equity from 2006 to 2020. She later worked as the Gathering for Change coordinator for the San Francisco City Hall Youth Commission from 2008 to 2009. In this position, she organized numerous community-focused events and conferences throughout various San Francisco neighborhoods. During her time as a coordinator, Hernandez was in charge of fifteen youth interns at City Hall and orchestrated nine unique live art shows. From 2010 to 2014, Hernandez was the Water Writes Mural Project Coordinator for the Estria Foundation. Hernandez was also a board member of the organization Youth Together from 2008 to 2016. During her time in this role, she worked on addressing education inequality in both Oakland, California, and Richmond, California. From 2015 to 2019, Hernandez worked as the manager of youth services for the Good Samaritan Family Resource Center. Currently, Hernandez works as the Manager of the Excelsior Strong Casa de Apoyo program. This program is run by the San Francisco Latino Task Force and is dedicated to providing various Latino community resources throughout the Excelsior district.

== Art and activism ==
=== Water Writes ===
Hernandez was co-created the “Water Writes” mural project, coordinating ten murals as well as actively participating in the creation of two murals, the Klamath River Mural, and Richmond, California Mural. The Klamath River Mural was aided in part by the Klamath Justice Coalition, and is located on the Orleans Market in Orleans, California. The mural depicts the removal of the dams of the Klamath River, along with dancers attempting to bring balance back to the river with their world renewal ceremony. On the left of the mural, images of the past effects of industrial and agricultural pollution are depicted, as well as the condition of the river before it was restored.

=== Indian Land ===
Indian Land, published in 2010, is a screen print image developed by Hernandez, Jesus Barraza, and Dignidad Rebelde. The image is a red silhouette of North, Central, and South America on a white background, with the words “Indian Land” depicted in red block letters curving around the coast of the Pacific Ocean, spanning from Canada to Chile. The image was included in the exhibition Printing the Revolution! The Rise and Impact of Chicano Graphics, 1965 to Now at the Smithsonian American Art Museum in Washington, D.C.

=== Precita Eyes ===
The Precita Eyes mural series is a series of murals that Hernandez created with various youth organizations from San Francisco’s historic Mission District. This collaboration of artists, students, and tenants of the houses culminated in the design and concept of the series, officially completed in January 2020. The images wrap around 344-348 Precita Avenue located in San Francisco, California.

=== Climate Justice Street Mural Project ===
The Climate Justice Street Mural Project was a street art project designed to be the largest street mural in the world prior to world leaders gathering for the Global Climate Action Summit in San Francisco. On September 8, 2018, Hernandez and several other muralists gathered together to paint a series of fifty different murals, with Hernandez credited with creating and designing several pieces in the project. Her main artwork in the project was a dead black snake flowing into a whirlpool of water, accompanied by some sunflowers and a clear blue sky. The image is surrounded by the words “Trust Your Struggle” a common motto of Hernandez’s.

=== White House "RESIST" banner ===
On January 15, 2017, Hernandez and seven other Greenpeace protesters climbed a 270-foot-tall construction crane a few blocks from the White House, and unfurled a massive orange and yellow banner emblazoned with the word, “RESIST”. The protest served to resist the recent inauguration of Donald Trump, who signed executive orders that delayed the implementation of at least thirty environmental rules, including freezing the new Environmental Protection Agency’s contracts and grant awards.
