= Muck =

Muck most often refers to:

- Muck (soil), a soil made up primarily of humus from drained swampland

Muck may also refer to:

== Places ==
=== Europe ===
- Muck, Scotland, an island
- Isle of Muck, County Antrim, a small island connected by sand spit to Portmuck, Northern Ireland

=== Elsewhere ===
- Muck Creek, a stream in the U.S. state of Washington
- Muck Glacier, Queen Maud Mountains, Antarctica

== Arts, entertainment, and media ==
=== Games ===
- Muck (gambling), a number of actions, both legal and illegal
  - Muck (poker), the discard pile or the action of discarding one's hand
- Multi-User Chat Kingdom or TinyMUCK, a type of text-based multi-user game or chat forum

=== Other uses in arts, entertainment, and media ===
- Muck (film), a 2015 horror film
- Muck, a red bulldozer/dumper character in the children's television series Bob the Builder
- "Muck", a song by Dinosaur Jr. from Green Mind, 1991
- "The Muck", a song by K.Flay from Inside Voices / Outside Voices, 2022

== People with the name ==
- Christian Muck, Austrian chess player
- Desa Muck (born 1955), Slovene writer and actor
- Karl Muck (1859–1940), German conductor
- Muck Sticky (born 1977), American musician, songwriter, actor and artist

== Other uses ==
- Muck (mining), sorting out the rich ore from the poor rock in an underground metallic mine after blasting
- Muck diving, diving into a normally muddy or "mucky" environment

== See also ==
- Mucc, a Japanese rock band
- Mucker (disambiguation)
- Muckraker
- Muk (disambiguation)
