= Paint Louis =

Hip hop event in St. Louis, Missouri, United States

- Genre: Hip hop
- Dates: August 29–31, 2025
- Locations: St. Louis, Missouri
- Years active: 1997 - Present
- Founders: John Harrington, Jonah Anderson

Paint Louis is an annual global community event happening over the American holiday Labor Day bringing together people practicing all four elements of hip hop including graffiti, breakdancing, rapping and DJs to St. Louis for three days of creation and performance. The event started informally in 1995 as a "graffiti jam" and became more formalized in 1997 as noted with its 20th anniversary celebration in 2017. For the 25th year of the annual event, Paint Louis brought hip-hop pioneer KRS-One to perform at the event for free.

The event is well known as the largest gathering of graffiti writers who have permission to legally paint the Mississippi River flood wall, along the Mississippi river all south of the Gateway Arch, deemed the "longest mural in the world" by Guinness Records. Paint Louis is an international gathering of writers from around the world.

== Program ==
=== The event ===
Two days of graffiti writing and painting takes place usually from the Saturday and Sunday of the main event period over American Labor Day holiday.

=== Paint Littles ===
Extra cans called "scrap cans" are made available for free daily at the event. Originally called "Scrap Cans for Kids", the event is an outreach program to the community where seasoned graffiti writers teach kids the basics of graffiti writing. It is a family friendly event.

== Timeline ==
=== 1995 - 1996 ===
Group of local St. Louis graffiti writers come together to do a "graffiti jam".

=== 1997 ===
The Underground Superfest takes place at the Mississippi River flood wall. Graffiti artists from across the U.S. make their way to St. Louis to paint.

=== 1998 ===
Paint Louis 1998 had formal t-shirts and a DVD documentary created about the event. Rappers Fat Joe and Big Pun came to the event and painted murals. Tribal Street Wear and Starbucks Frappuccino sponsored the event. And, the Guinness Book of World Records named the Paint Louis wall as the longest graffiti mural in the world.

=== 2012 ===
Two of the original committee members decided to initiate the event formally again with the support of city officials. Artists included Whisper, Stun1 and Peat Wollaeger.

=== 2013 ===
By 2013, Paint Louis hosted 300 artists and had around 1,000 people attend and took place earlier than Labor Day on June 21–23, 2013.

=== 2014 ===
Paint Louis 2014 took place from August 29, 2014 until September 1, 2014 with 200 artists, 1 mile of wall, over 4 days.

Organized by a committee included John Harrington from Midwest Avengers. Organizers spent more than $10,000 to get Paint Louis off the ground. One of the original organizers, Jonah Anderson, better known as Stun or Stun1, said about Paint Louis, "This is like the Super Bowl of graffiti."

=== 2015 ===
Paint Louis 2015 took place Labor Day 2015. After Paint Louis 2015, organizer John Harrington stated that he fears Paint Louis will be cancelled in the future. He noted that 200 writers were invited to participate and propose their works so that wall space may be allocated. But, over 350 writers showed up who did not go through the submission process, so complications arose from the overload. Some artists were unhappy and took action.

Artists who did not go through the submission process painted unsanctioned areas all over town.

Harrington created a cleanup crew of 30 of the Paint Louis event participants who took tips on locations to unsanctioned graffiti to cleanup for free. The crew spent $1,200 to cleanup works receiving complaints.

=== 2016 ===
Paint Louis 2016 took place Labor Day 2016 and was not cancelled as had been predicted in 2015 and consisted of International artists. The size of the wall also reported as "20-feet-by-4-miles."

=== 2017 ===
Paint Louis 2017 took place from September 22–24, 2017, the 20th anniversary of Paint Louis.

=== 2018 ===
Paint Louis 2018 took place Labor Day Weekend from August 31 until September 2, 2018.

Performances were given by F.R.E.S.H. Hip Hop St. Louis, Basement Sound System DJ Collective, Far Fetched Music Collective and Jonezy & Friends.

=== 2019 ===
Paint Louis 2019 continued the annual tradition of graffiti writing from August 28 until September 2, 2019. Paint Louis 2019 focused on women's presence in the art form. Co-founder John Harrington said that 212 artists registered but more than 250 participated at the event to paint 20-foot high murals on the longest graffiti wall in the world.

=== 2020 ===
Paint Louis 2020 was held online. John Harrington, Paint Louis' co-founder and organizer, stated that “Paint Louis has always been about showcasing local St. Louis artists and Midwest artists as a whole. Over the years, we expanded it to all street and mural artists and it has become an international event. Due to Covid-19, we feel the best way to keep the event safe this year is to do a virtual event featuring all types of visual artists including canvas painters, graphic designers, digital artists, air brushers, muralists, and graffiti art.” All activity for Paint Louis 2020 is organized on the official project webpage.

=== 2021 ===
Paint Louis 2021 returned after the 2020 in-person pandemic hiatus from September 3 through September 5. Over 300 artists participated in the event including artist Norm4eva.

=== 2022 ===
The 25th annual Paint Louis took place from September 1 until September 3, 2023 with over 500 artists participating from around the world. Paint Louis brought hip-hop pioneer KRS-One to perform at the event for free.

=== 2023 ===
Over 500 artist joined the 26th Paint Louis in 2023 which took place between September 1 until September 3. Paint Louis brought respected hiphop artists Souls of Mischief to the event to perform for free. Also, this year began a rebranded event for kids called "Paint Littles" to teach kids how to paint.

=== 2024 ===
Paint Louis 2024 is August 30 until September 1 and features artists from around the world including Peat Eyez, Matt Minetta, Jason "Killer Napkins", Max Presur, Sase 1 WST and hundreds more. This is the 27th year of Paint Louis. Paint Louis brought transformative golden age rapper Rakim to the festival for a sponsored free concert for all attendees.

=== 2025 ===
Paint Louis 2025 took place August 29 until August 31, 2025. For 2025, artists started painting early in order to be able to catch up with friends. Over 35,000 people attended Paint Louis 2025. One mural created this year was legendary St. Louis Civil Rights Activist Percy Green was commemorated with a mural produced by Kristian Blackmon, Marquis Terrel and Lindy Drew.

At Paint Louis 2025, the original graffiti archive, Art Crimes, announced an archive of Paint Louis works from 2021, 2022, 2023, and 2024.

== See also ==
- Graffiti in the United States
