= United Graffiti Artists =

American graffiti artists collective

United Graffiti Artists (aka UGA) was an early American graffiti artists collective, founded in 1972 by Hugo Martinez in New York City. UGA was the first organized group of writers, and the first to promote graffiti as a high art. Martinez, then a student activist at City College of New York, organized a group of teenagers who had been tagging the subways into a loose collective, formalizing their work and paving the way for commercialization. In September 1973, UGA organized the first ever gallery show of graffiti at the Razor Gallery in SoHo.

According to authors Cori Anderson and Kevin Jackson, the artists of UGA elevated the profile of graffiti, bringing it from the subways and the streets to art galleries and studios. Henry Chalfant, a sculptor from New York City said "United Graffiti Artists (UGA) and Nation of Graffiti Artists (NOGA), marked the first attempts to organize and legitimize writers as artists."

Early members of UGA included PHASE 2, SJK 171, TAKI 183, HENRY 161 (Henry Medina), and MIKE 171 (Mike Hughes).
