= Pittsburgh Creative and Performing Arts School =

Pittsburgh Creative and Performing Arts 6–12
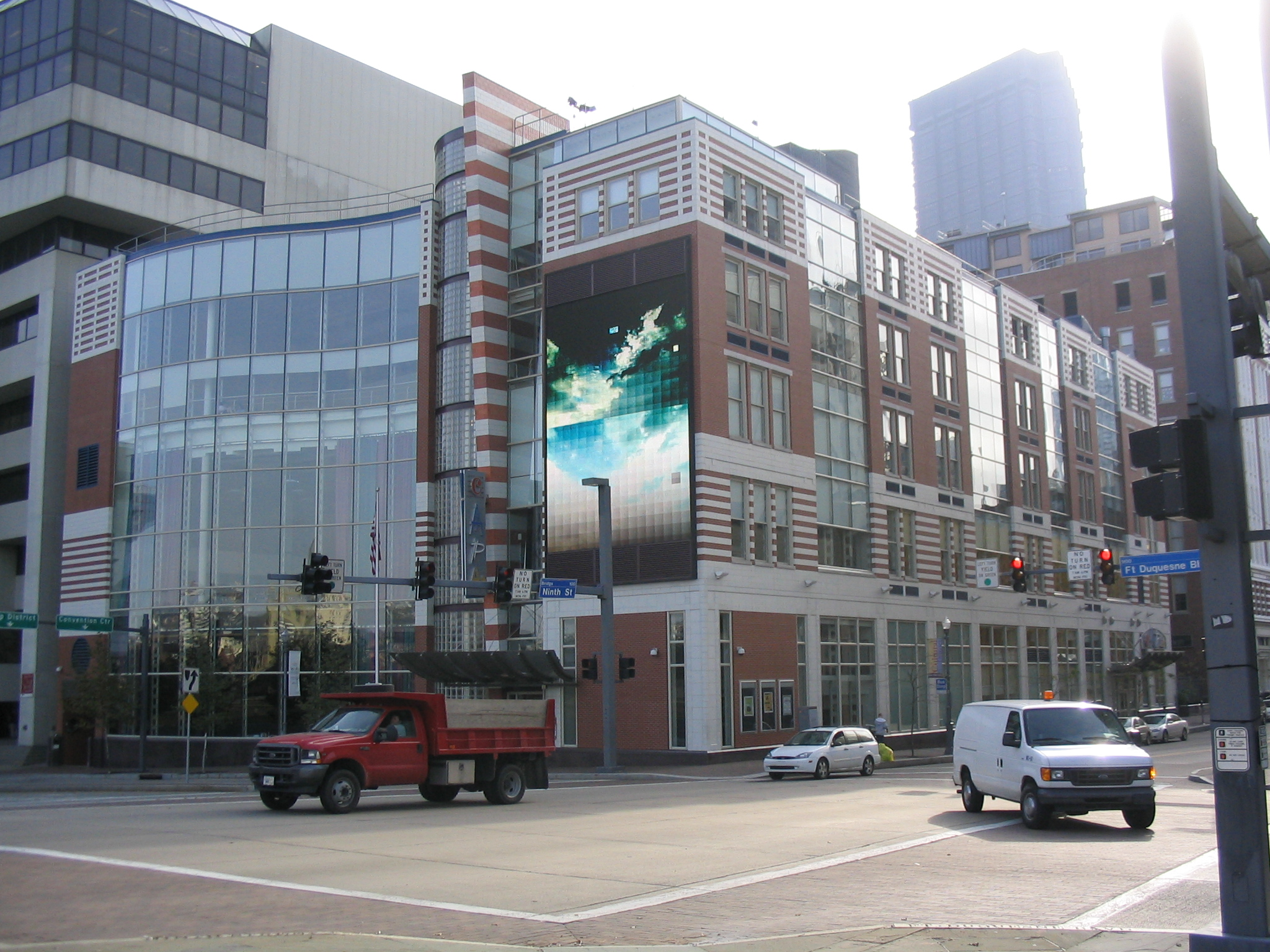
- United States

Information
- Type: Public - Magnet
- Motto: Believe. Be alive. Work.
- Established: September 1979
- School district: Pittsburgh Public Schools
- Principal: James Clawson
- Grades: 6–12
- Colors: Black and white, Also red, yellow, white and blue written out in CAPA's symbol
- Athletics: Ultimate Frisbee
- Mascot: Unicorn
- Website: CAPA

Pittsburgh Creative and Performing Arts 6–12 (CAPA) is a magnet school located in the Cultural District of Downtown Pittsburgh, Pennsylvania. CAPA is one of five 6th to 12th grade schools in the Pittsburgh Public Schools. It was formed from a merger between CAPA High School and Rogers CAPA Middle School.

CAPA offers students seven art majors: visual arts, literary arts, theater, production technology, instrumental music, vocal music, and dance. The theater major includes traditional theater and musical theater. The Instrumental department is composed of Instrumental and Piano Majors. Arts classes are taught by adjunct faculty who are working professionals in their fields.

Admission is by portfolio or audition. The school offers academic studies including Pittsburgh Scholars Program (PSP) and Centers for Advanced Study (CAS), along with activities like the National Honor Society, Tri-M Music Honor Society, National Art Honor Society, yearbook, newspaper, student council, Amnesty International, Model United Nations, the American Mathematics Competitions and North American Computational Linguistics Open competition, and ski club.

CAPA opened in September 1979 with 35 students, housed in Baxter Elementary School in the Homewood neighborhood. While in Homewood, CAPA only housed grades 9-12, while arts students in grades 6-8 were at Rogers Middle School. The school moved into its current space at Ninth Street and Fort Duquesne Boulevard at the beginning of the 2003–2004 school year.

The 11-story, 175,000-square-foot (16,300 m^{2}) includes a 400-seat auditorium, a black box theater, a cabaret theater, an art gallery, media arts center, television studio, fitness center, computer labs, and rehearsal spaces for the departments. This location allows students to study their craft in the hub of Pittsburgh's cultural center and to collaborate with artists from all over. Pittsburgh CAPA has become one of five 6–12 schools in Downtown Pittsburgh.

== Enrollment ==
As of July 31, 2025:

Group	Number of students	Percent
All	826	100.0%
White	499	60.3%
African American	216	26.0%
Asian	17	2.1%
Hispanic	19	2.3%
Multiracial	73	8.8%
American Indian	2	0.2
Male	251	30.4%
Female	575	69.6%

=== Literary arts ===
The literary arts program at CAPA is a seven-year course of study in creative writing — one of only a dozen nationwide. Student activities include the national Poetry Out Loud competition, and the Scholastic Art and Writing Awards.

=== Visual arts ===
Students in the Visual Arts Department learn painting, drawing, sculpting, ceramics, printmaking, digital media, art history, and fiber arts. Student work is displayed around the school as well as on the Astrovision (Jumbo-Tron). The Astrovision display has since broken, and has not been repaired.

=== Dance ===
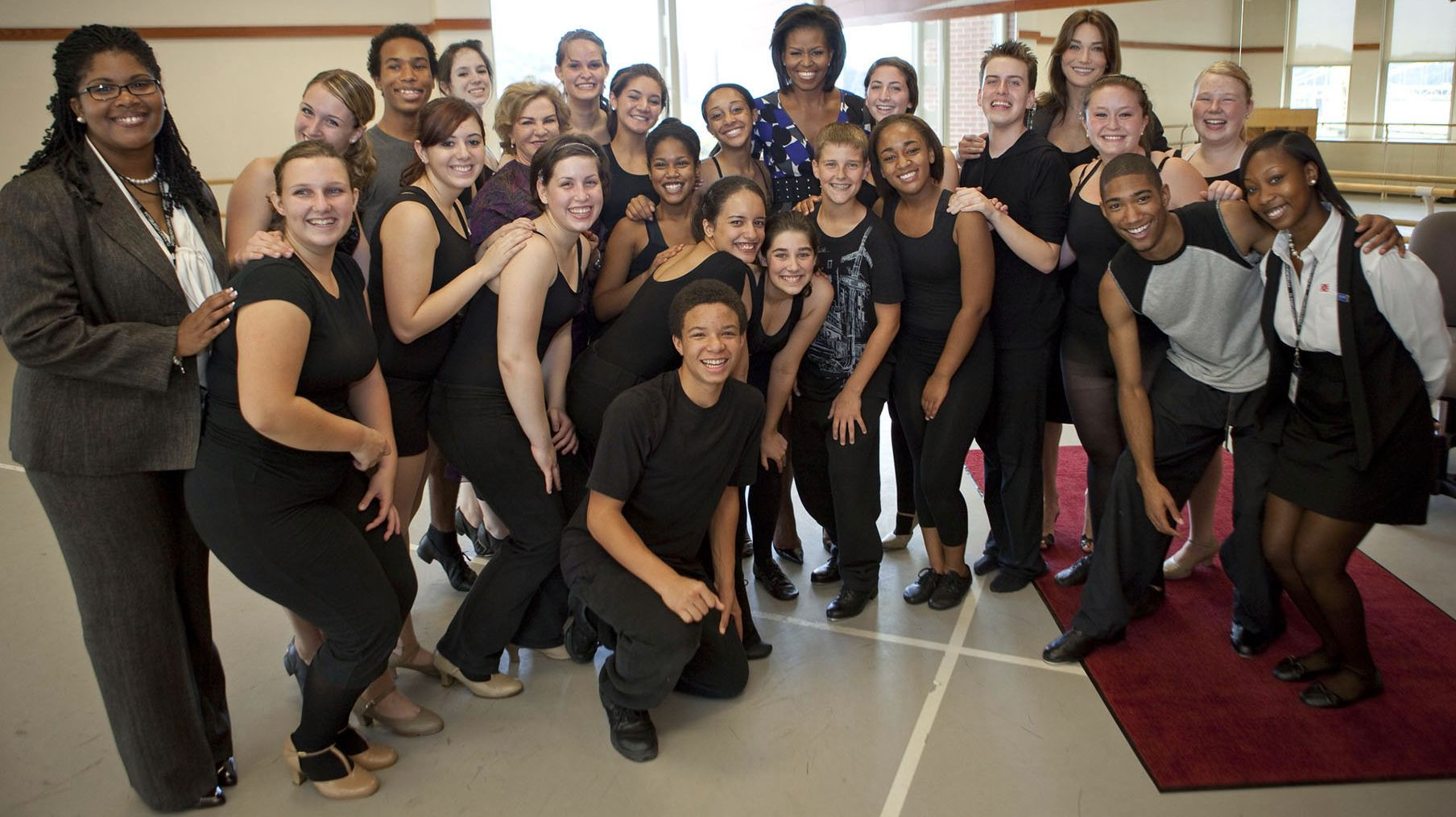
First Lady Michelle Obama, Carla Bruni, wife of then French President Nicolas Sarkozy, and Marisa Leticia Lula da Silva, wife of then Brazilian President Luiz Inácio Lula da Silva, pose for a group photo after a performance by students of CAPA in September 2009.

The mission of the Dance Department is to provide a comprehensive and quality dance education in an environment that nurtures the talent of each individual dancer. Emphasis is placed on refining and enhancing dance technique while simulating creativity.

=== Theatre ===
Drama/Musical Theatre. The theatre department provides a four-year structured course in musical theatre and drama. Every year the musical theatre students perform two recitals and the All School Musical.

=== Instrumental music ===
Classes available to instrumental music majors include orchestra, wind ensemble, string orchestra, chamber music ensembles, various jazz bands, music/jazz theory, music history, piano lab, and solfege. Each student normally receives a private lesson once every two weeks with a faculty member specializing on his/her instrument.

=== Piano ===
Piano students learn techniques, piano history, new genres of music, play in ensembles, have private piano lessons, and are classically trained. They have a piano recital every year along with other performances in collaboration with the Instrumental department.

=== Production Technology ===
The Pro-Tech major gives students the opportunity to learn engineering techniques and the fundamentals of building sets for theatre shows. Classes in Pro-Tech include stagecraft, lighting design, technical theatre and communication. They act as crew for recitals, performances, and musicals.

=== Vocal music ===
The Voice Department offers students education through its sequential four-year curriculum, through collaborative work with professional music organizations, and through performance opportunities and Master Classes. Students in grades 9–12 receive a private voice lesson every other week. Students will perform in Concert Choir, Jazz Choir, and Chamber Ensemble. Students participate in the Opera Workshop class and perform in the yearly Opera. Other classes include: music theory, piano lab, music history, solfeggio, eurhythmics, Studio Class, and the creative music technology class. Each Friday, students perform in a recital for their peers studying vocal music. They showcase songs that they work on in private lessons with the staff.

== Athletics ==
CAPA offers unified track and bocce students may also play at their home school for all other high school sports.

The 6–8 students do have sports teams. They have a boys and girls soccer, basketball, girls softball and boys baseball. The girls soccer team was an undefeated section champion in 2004. The CAPA 6–8 sports teams mascot is the unicorn changed from the phoenix in 2012, changed from the unicorn in 2011.

== Notable alumni ==
- Kyle Abraham, dancer & choreographer
- Margot Bingham, actor & singer-songwriter
- Noa Denmon, illustrator
- Chris Garver, tattoo artist
- MFONE, graffiti artist
- Leo Pellegrino, musician
- Billy Porter, actor & singer
- Code Orange & Adventures members Eric Balderose, Joe Goldman, Kimi Hanauer, Greg Kern, Dominic Landolina, Reba Meyers, and Jami Morgan
