= Muk, Iran =

Muk or Mook (Persian: موك) in Iran may refer to:

- Muk, Fars
- Muk, South Khorasan
