= Pink Lady (art) =

1966 painting by Lynne Seemayer

Coordinates: 34.0695°N 118.7078°W

- A photograph of the Pink Lady in situ, c. 1966
- Artist: Lynne Seemayer
- Completion date: 31 October 1966
- Medium: Paint
- Subject: Female nude
- Designation: Graffiti
- Condition: Destroyed
- Location: Malibu Canyon Road, Santa Monica Mountains
- Website: pinkladyofmalibu.com

The Pink Lady was a painting on a rock face near Malibu, California in 1966. The painting was created by Lynne Seemayer (1936–2017), an artist and paralegal from Northridge, California. It was a 60-foot (18 m) tall depiction of a frolicking nude woman.

== History ==
The painting was located on the rock face above the southern entrance of the tunnel on Malibu Canyon Road near Malibu. For some time, the rock face above the tunnel had been covered with graffiti, which Seemayer felt was "an eyesore". Working at night, she began removing the graffiti in January 1966, using ropes to suspend herself in front of the rock. When the rock was clean, she created the painting on the night of Friday, October 28, 1966.

By November 1, the painting had begun to attract local news coverage. It was dubbed the Pink Lady by the media, due to the pink paint used for the skin. Los Angeles County road officials, concerned about traffic problems the painting might cause, attempted to remove it with high-pressure spray from fire hoses, and then with paint stripper. However, Seemayer had used heavy-duty house paint for her creation, and both methods failed to remove it.

When she realized that her work was in danger, Seemayer publicly admitted to creating the Pink Lady, and sought a court injunction. This failed, however; on November 3, a road crew covered the painting with brown paint. The Pink Lady was visible through the fading brown paint for years before it was finally removed from the rock face.

Seemayer sued the county for $1 million for the destruction of her work, and the county counter-sued for $28,000 in removal costs. Since the painting was on private property, both cases were dismissed by the court. For some time after the painting was removed, Seemayer received hate mail and phone calls from people who felt the work was obscene, including threats of violence against her and her children. She also received a few offers from art galleries to show her work.

== See also ==
- Land art
- Geoglyph
- Hillside letters
