= MUC =

MUC, Muc or Muć may refer to:

== Places ==
- Muć, a village and municipality in Split-Dalmatia County, Croatia
- Munich Airport (IATA airport code), Munich, Germany
- Munich-Riem Airport, a 1939–1992 airport in Munich, Germany
- Montreal Urban Community, a former regional government in Quebec from 1970 to 2001

== Awards ==
- Meritorious Unit Citation, an Australian military award
- Meritorious Unit Commendation, a United States military award

== Education ==
- Minzu University of China, Beijing, China
- Mount Union College (now University of Mount Union), Alliance, Ohio, United States
- Morris University Center of the Southern Illinois University Edwardsville, Edwardsville, Illinois, United States

== Science ==
- MUC1, Mucin 1, a protein
- Metastatic urothelial carcinoma, a type of cancer
- Mixed urethral contamination, where more than one type of organism is present in a clean-catch urine sample, but no strain predominates

== Sports and entertainment ==
- Le Mans Union Club 72, a French association football club
- Magic User's Club, an anime series
- Mid-Ulster Cup, association football cup competition in Northern Ireland
- Miracle Ultraviolence Connection, in pro wrestling
- MUC, a 2003 album by Tomcraft
- Manitoba Underwater Council, the governing body of Underwater football

== Other uses ==
- Message Understanding Conference, an information extraction competition
- Multi-user chat, a synchronous online conference with multiple participants

== See also ==
- SuperMUC, a supercomputer of the Leibniz Supercomputing Centre of the Bavarian Academy of Sciences
