= Lee Quiñones =

Puerto Rican artist and actor (born 1960)

- Born: 1960 (age 65–66); Ponce, Puerto Rico
- Known for: Graffiti, Painting
- Notable work: ”Honest George” (2009)
- Movement: Subway Graffiti
- Patrons: El Museo del Barrio; Whitney Museum of Art; Museum of the City New York; Groninger Museum (Groningen, Netherlands); Museum Boijmans Van Beuningen (Rotterdam, Netherlands)

George Lee Quiñones (born 1960) is a Puerto Rican artist and actor. Quiñones rose to prominence by creating massive New York City subway car graffiti that carried his moniker "LEE". His style is rooted in popular culture and often with political messages.

== Life and career ==
Quiñones was born in Ponce, Puerto Rico, and raised on the Lower East Side of Manhattan. Also started drawing at the age of five, and started doing subway graffiti in 1974. By 1976, Lee was creating huge murals of graffiti art across the subway system. As a subway graffiti artist, Lee almost exclusively painted whole cars, all together about 125 cars. He was the major contributor to one of the first-ever whole-trains, along with DOC, MONO and SLAVE, the core members of The Fabulous Five crew, which also included DIRTY SLUG. It was the first ever whole-train to run in traffic.

In November 1976, ten subway cars were painted with a range of colorful murals and set a new benchmark for the scale of graffiti works. This is documented in an interview with Quiñones in the book Getting up by Craig Castleman, MIT Press (MA) (October 1982). "The Hell Express", "Earth is Hell, Heaven is Life", "Stop the Bomb" are some of Quiñones paintings that ran for months. Quiñones pieces were left untouched by other writers and some of them ran for years even though thousands of writers were painting on subway cars at that time.

Quiñones often added poetic messages in his pieces, such as "Graffiti is art and if art is a crime, please God, forgive me". Lee also painted huge handball court murals in his neighborhood, for instance “Howard the Duck,” the first whole handball court mural, in the spring of 1978 outside of his old high school, Corlears Junior High School #56. Around this time he befriended Brooklyn-based Fred Brathwaite, who later became known as Fab Five Freddy. In December 1979, Claudio Bruni, an art collector and heir to the Bruni wine fortune, offered Quiñones and Fab Five Freddy their first show at his Galleria La Medusa in Rome. In 1984, Quiñones participated in the group show Arte di Frontiera: New York Graffiti in Italy. By 1985, he was described as a legend among other graffiti artists.

In the 1980s, Quiñones began appearing in films. Most notably, he starred as Raymond Zoro in Charlie Ahearn's film Wild Style (1983). Quiñones played Sammy in Rosemary Rodriguez's Acts of Worship (2001). He plays himself in Adam Bhala Lough's Bomb the System (2002). He also appears in Videograf 10. Susan Seidelman's 1982 film Smithereens prominently featured a van with exterior designs painted by Quiñones.

In 2005, Quiñones raised money for the Boys & Girls Clubs of America affected by Hurricane Katrina. He has lectured at universities in Europe as well as in the U.S. at Columbia University, University of New Mexico, and the School of Visual Arts.

At an exhibition in 2008, all his paintings were sold to guitarist Eric Clapton. His paintings are housed in the permanent collections of the Whitney Museum of Art, the Museum of the City New York, the Groninger Museum (Groningen, Netherlands) and the Museum Boijmans Van Beuningen (Rotterdam, Netherlands), and have been exhibited at the New Museum Of Contemporary Art (New York City), the Museum of National Monuments (Paris, France) and the Staatliche Museum (Germany). Pictures of his years as graffiti writer are featured in the books Subway Art, Spraycan Art., "The Birth of Graffiti", "Getting up" and "Graffiti Kings: New York City Mass Transit Art of the 1970s".

In 2013, Quiñones appeared on BET's series The Artist's Way to discuss his evolving style. He is featured in the documentary Boom for Real: The Late Teenage Years of Jean-Michel Basquiat, which premiered at the 2017 Toronto International Film Festival.

In 2019, Quiñones had an exhibit at Charlie James Gallery in Los Angeles. It featured early sketches and drawings from the 1970s through the 2000s, and new paintings. His work was featured in the exhibition Writing the Future: Basquiat and the Hip-Hop Generation at the Museum of Fine Arts, Boston from October 2020 to July 2021.

== Personal life ==
Quiñones lives with his wife, journalist Tamara Warren, and their two children in Bedford-Stuyvesant, Brooklyn.
