= TAKI 183 =

American graffiti artist

TAKI 183 UGA
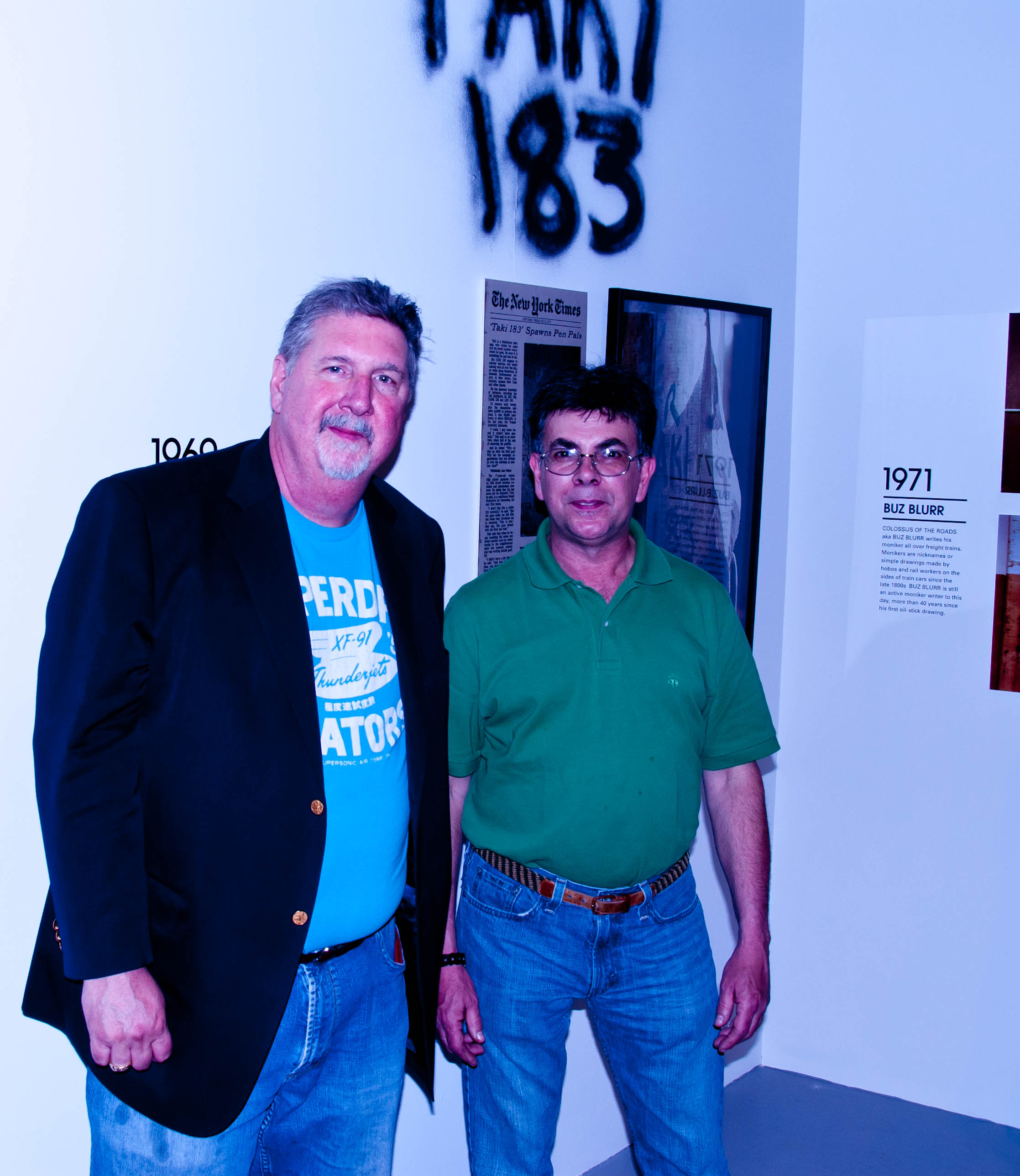
- TAKI 183 (right) at a 2010 gallery event with his tag visible on the wall behind
- Born: Demetrios; 1953–1954
- Years active: 1960s–1970s
- Known for: Public art Graffiti; Painting; Street art
- Style: Tagging
- Movement: Graffiti
- Website: taki183.net

Tag

TAKI 183 is the tag of a Greek-American graffitist who was active during the late 1960s and early 1970s in New York City. The graffitist, whose given name is Demetrios, has never revealed his full name.

== Biography ==
TAKI 183 was a graffiti tagger active during the late 1960s and early 1970s in New York City. His tag was short for 'Dimitraki', an alternative for his Greek birth-name Dimitrios, and the number 183 came from his address on 183rd Street in Washington Heights. He worked as a foot messenger in New York City and would write his nickname around the streets that he frequented.

On July 21, 1971, The New York Times published an article about him titled "Taki 183" Spawns Pen Pals. TAKI 183 spurred hundreds of imitators including Joe 136, BARBARA 62, EEL 159, YANK 135 and LEO 136 as examples provided by the newspaper. Those who got their names up the most and who developed signature tags became known in their communities. Graffiti became a way for many young people to try to get attention and the attention TAKI 183 received spurred this on.

TAKI 183 was last known to be the owner of a foreign car repair shop in Yonkers. In an interview with the New York Daily News of April 9, 1989, he talked about his retirement as a graffiti writer: "As soon as I got into something more productive in my life, I stopped. Eventually I got into business, got married, bought a house, had a kid. Didn't buy a spray can wagon, but I grew up, you could say that."

TAKI 183 was an early member of the artists collective United Graffiti Artists, founded in 1972 by Hugo Martinez. It is also rumored he was an inspiration for the 1985 film Turk 182.

His graffiti appeared in the 1985 movie Just One of the Guys. It appears on a ballroom stall wall after Joyce's character Terry uses the restroom for the first time as a man. TAKI 183 was also mentioned, and his art featured, in the 1983 documentary Style Wars.

== Publication with contribution by Dimitrios ==
- The History of American Graffiti. New York City: Harper Design, 2011. By Roger Gastman and Caleb Neelon. ISBN 978-0061698781. Dimitrios contributed a foreword.

== Film with contribution by Dimitrios ==
- Bomb It (2007) by Jon Reiss
- Wall Writers (2016) by Roger Gastman

== See also ==
- Julio 204
