= Shahrak-e Muk =

Shahrak-e Muk شهرك موك
- Village
- Location within Iran
- Coordinates: 29°06′06″N 52°38′53″E
- Country: Iran
- Province: Fars
- County: Firuzabad
- Bakhsh: Meymand
- Rural District: Khvajehei

Population (2006)
  - Total: 244
- Time zone: UTC+3:30 (IRST)
  - Summer (DST): UTC+4:30 (IRDT)

Shahrak-e Muk (Persian: شهرك موك, also Romanized as Shahrak-e Mūk; also known as Mook and Mūk) is a village in Khvajehei Rural District, Meymand District, Firuzabad County, Fars province, Iran. At the 2006 census, its population was 244, in 58 families.
