= Muk =

Muk or MUK may refer to:

- Muk (food), a type of jelly found in Korean cuisine
- Muk (Pokémon), a poison-type Pokémon
- Muk-chi-ba, a variant of the two-player game rock-paper-scissors
- Motorsport UK, governing body of four-wheel motorsport in the UK

== People ==
- Muk (Korean name), a Korean family name
- Petr Muk (1965–2010), Czech pop musician, composer and performer

== Places ==
- Muk, Iran (disambiguation)
- Muk, Tajikistan
- Muk-dong, a dong, neighbourhood of Jungnang-gu in Seoul, South Korea
- Mukilteo, Washington, often referred to as "Muk" by its inhabitants.
- IATA Code for Mauke Airport, at Ma'uke Island, in the Cook Islands

== See also ==
- Mucc, a Japanese rock band
- Muck (disambiguation)
