= Mucker =

Mucker or Muckers may refer to:

== People ==
- Muckers, the nickname of a group in Pietism, followers of certain theologians
- Larry Mucker (born 1954), American football player
- "Mucker", a nickname of William Anderson (RAAF officer) (1891–1975), Australian air vice-marshal

== Sports and games ==
- The Muckers, a football hooligan firm linked to the football club Blackpool F.C.
- Grinder (ice hockey) or mucker, a player better known for his hard work and checking than his scoring
- Muckers (game), also known as "ring toss"

== Other uses ==
- The Mucker, novel by Edgar Rice Burroughs
- An alternative name for a Rocker Shovel Loader
