= Cope2 =

American graffiti artist

Cope2 KD
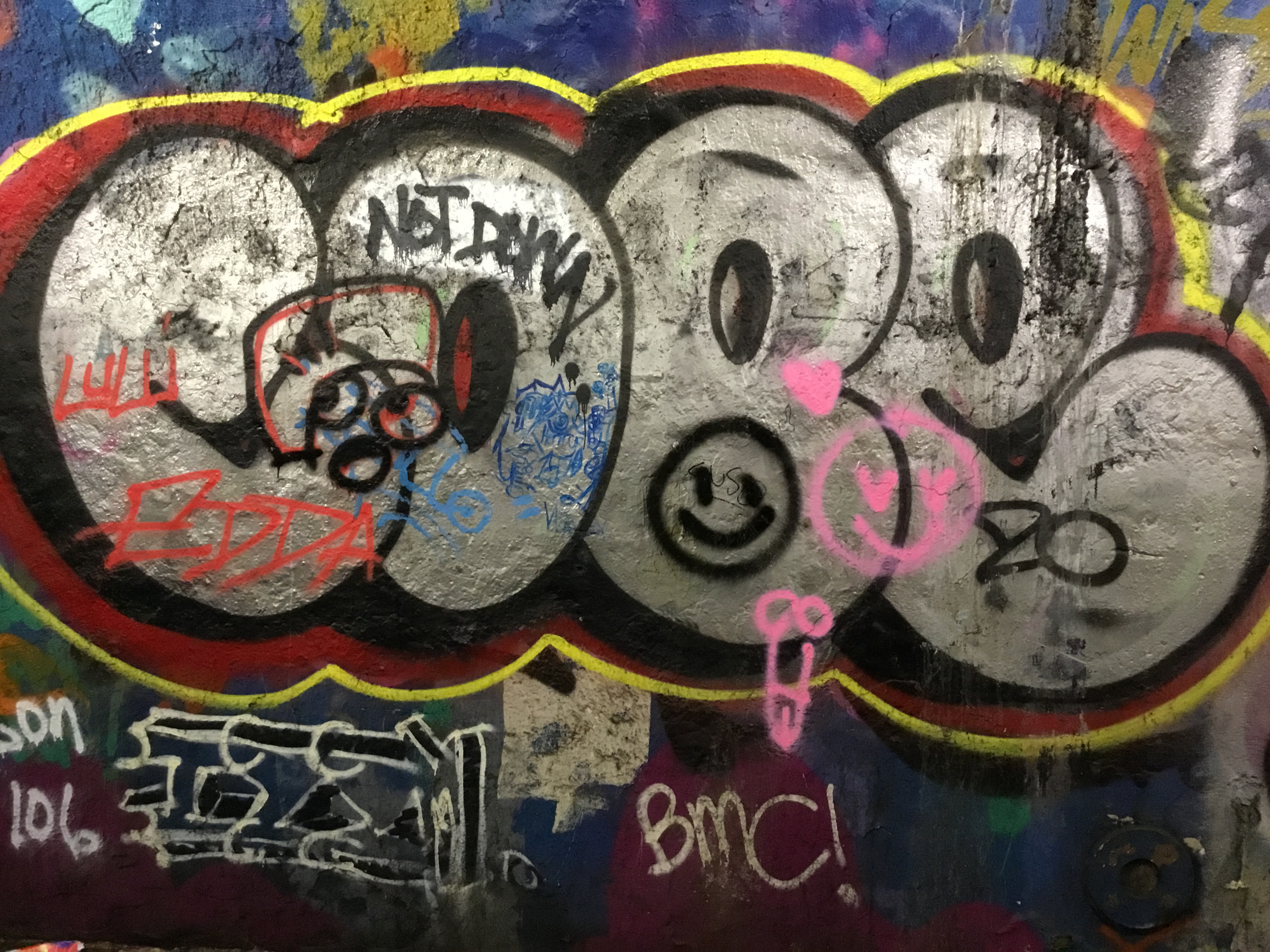
- A throw up by Cope2 in Hudson Heights, Manhattan, 2022
- Born: Fernando Carlo, Jr. 1968 (age 57–58); New York City, New York, U.S.
- Movement: Graffiti
- Spouse: Soraya Marquez
- Website: Official website

Fernando Carlo (born 1968), also known as Cope2, is an American artist from the Kingsbridge section of the Bronx, New York.

== Early life ==
Cope2 has been a graffiti artist since 1985. His cousin "Chico 80" inspired Cope2 to pursue writing. In 1982, he made his own crew called Kids Destroy, eventually changing to Kings Destroy after he dubbed himself "King of the 4 Line".

Cope2's throw-up was given to him by Cap to use until he had enough skills to create his own.

== Career ==
Some of Cope2's initial commercial artwork has been sold at Christie's for $1000 USD per painting. Early work includes cover art for a Boogie Down Productions album titled Sex and Violence.

In 2002, Cope2 provided artwork for Adam Bhala Lough's Bomb the System, including a piece on the Brooklyn Bridge. He can be seen on the DVD's behind the scenes footage painting one of the pieces at the end of the film.

In 2003, Cope2's book entitled Cope2: True Legend was published by Righters.com.

In 2005, Cope2 collaborated with and designed a pair of sneakers for Converse under the "Chuck Taylor All-Stars" line.

Also in 2005, Time magazine commissioned Cope2, for $20,000 USD, to paint a billboard ad in the SoHo district of Manhattan, on Houston and Wooster. The ad depicts the magazines cover with graffiti tags scrawled over it; the text reads "Post-Modernism? Neo-Expressionism? Time. Know Why". In 2006, Cope2 appeared in Marc Ecko's video game, Marc Ecko's Getting Up: Contents Under Pressure. He features as one of the "graffiti legends" who gives the protagonist advice on the graffiti world. Cope2's "throw-up" has also appeared on walls in the video game GTA IV and in the movie Shrek the Third.

In 2008, Cope2 collaborated with Adidas and Foot Locker to release a collection of clothes and accessories in Europe. The collection included baseball caps, jackets, T-shirts, sweaters, belts and sneakers.

In 2011, Cope2 teamed up with Shepard Fairey and Martha Cooper to create a screen print, limited to 450 editions, capturing the collaboration between these iconic figures in street art. Two years later, in 2013, Cope2 released another screen print with Shepard Fairey, limited to 300 editions, to launch the collaboration collection between Cope2 and Fairey's renowned clothing brand, OBEY, further solidifying their creative partnership and influence in the world of urban art and fashion.

== Legal issues ==
Cope2 has been arrested numerous times for drugs, vandalism and violence.

Cope2 was arrested and charged with two counts of felony mischief and one count of graffiti in September 2010 on suspicion of vandalizing subway cars in a tunnel in uptown Manhattan in 2009. The arrest took over a year as he was abroad. On June 27, 2012, he took a plea agreement in exchange for a conditional discharge.

In 2015, Cope2 was arrested again for allegedly pulling a gun on fellow artist at the Bowery Graffiti Wall in New York City.

== Controversy ==
Cope2 has a well-documented history of making problematic, homophobic, racist, threatening, and misogynistic rants online. Despite this, in 2014, Cope2 unveiled a pride-based mural at the Bowery Graffiti Wall in New York City. However, this was met with criticism from victims of his abuse, including RJ Rushmore, editor of Vandalog, who shared several of Cope2's past homophobic and violent tweets and Instagram posts.
