= Julio 204 =

New York graffiti artist

- Years active: 1967 - 1970
- Known for: Inspiring Taki 183
- Style: Tagging
- Movement: Graffiti

JULIO 204 was a Colombian resident of Inwood who wrote graffiti in his youth. He's usually credited as being the original New York City writer and the inspiration for Taki 183. He started writing his nickname in his neighborhood as early as 1967. He retired when he was arrested for vandalism in the summer of 1970.

Julio lived on 204th Street in the Inwood neighborhood of Upper Manhattan, and was a member of the Savage Skulls. In 1971 the New York Times published an article about another graffiti writer with a similar style of including their street number in their tag, Taki 183. According to the article Julio had been writing for a couple of years when Taki began tagging his own name all around the city. Taki also states in the article that Julio "was busted and stopped". Julio 204 kept his tags localized to his own neighborhood, and never rose to the height of fame as Taki, who was the first to go "All City".
