= Estria =

American graffiti artist

- Estria Miyashiro
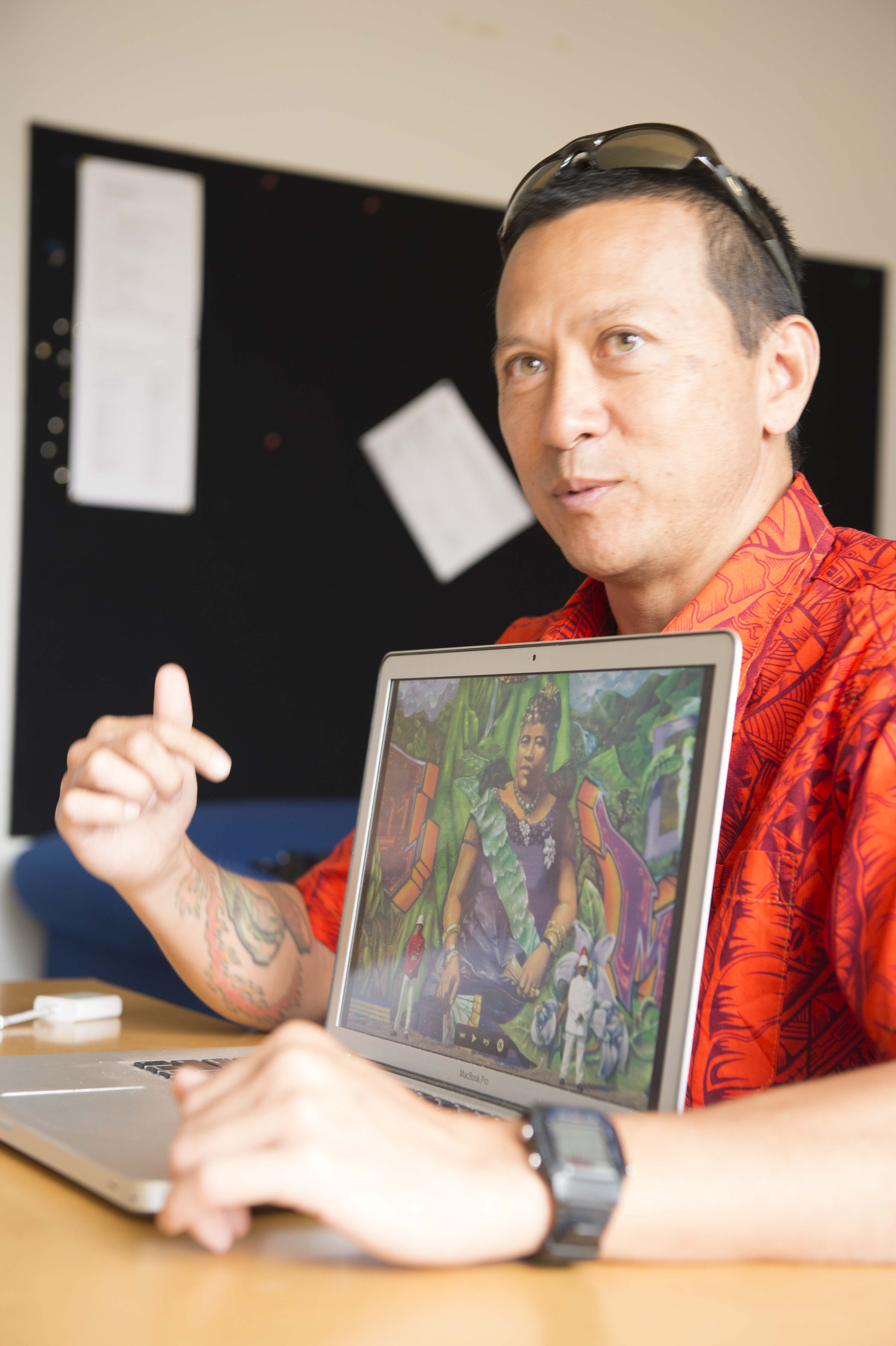
- Portrait of Estria at Unitec Institute of Technology, 2017
- Born: Todd Johnson; Hawaii, United States
- Education: University of San Francisco; Academy of Art
- Movement: Graffiti
- Website: estria on Instagram

Estria is the tag of Todd Johnson (born in Hawaii), a graffiti artist and muralist based in the San Francisco Bay Area.

== Early life and education ==
Johnson, better known as Estria, has been spray painting since 1984. He moved to San Francisco in the early 1980s for college, where he attended both the University of San Francisco and the Academy of Art in San Francisco for a BFA in Illustration.

== Career ==
In 1994, Estria was arrested for graffiti and appeared on CNN, the National Enquirer, the San Francisco Chronicle and The San Francisco Examiner. The coverage served as a platform for him to speak on graffiti's social and political impact, which he had already been doing as a lecturer at different universities.

Estria's work as an educator, activist, and entrepreneur shaped him to spearhead several organizations and businesses. In 2002, he founded Oakland-based Tumis Design, a company that develops graphic communications and web applications for non-profits and foundations. He founded Samurai Graphix in 2007, a custom screen-printing company in neighboring San Leandro, serving Oakland's public school needs.

=== Community involvement / political activism ===
Estria co-founded Visual Element, Oakland's EastSide Arts Alliance's free mural workshop, in 2000. Visual Element targets at-risk youth and develops them into using their artistic skills. He also currently volunteers with 808 Urban, developing youth mural workshops in Honolulu, as a positive alternative to drugs and violence. On September 18, 2010, Estria and Jeremy LaTrasse co-founded The Estria Foundation which is committed to raising the “social consciousness on human and environmental issues” and launched the Water Writes initiative.

Estria co-founded and created the foundation in hopes to create art that “speaks truth to power.” He does this in various ways whether this be by festivals, exploring new pieces, and so much more. He focuses his work on Hawaiian students to dive deeper into culture, education, and ancestry. Estria’s organization also has students work on big murals relating to hawaiian tradition through lyrics or mele, the exploration of a place through stories.

=== Murals ===
According to the Estria Foundation website, the primary goal of the Water Writes project was to raise awareness of water crises around the world. Murals were created in collaboration with local schools and communities. “The Water Writes mural series ended in 2014 with twelve domestic and international cities painted with large scale murals.”

Estria's first mural in The Water Writes series by The Estria Foundation was painted in Los Angeles California on Whittier Boulevard. The mural was titled Cuidela, which translates to “take care of it” in Spanish. This mural was done with the help of an 8th grade science class at KIPPLA Prep having the kids help to paint their experiences with water. The mural depicted stories of Chumash and also Aztec mythologies of the rain. It featured birds and fish to show the resilience of the people and pictured water in different places like in pipelines and water bottles to show the commercialization of it. It even featured the Aztec mythical water goddess Chalchiuhtlicue who the Aztecs prayed to in times of water needs. The "Water Writes” series traveled to 10 cities showing the water crises and unique realities that each community faced. The mural was a way to connect with the community and bring awareness to the issue and let the community know that they were not alone.

The third mural in that series, Ola Ka Wai, Ola Ka Honua (As the Water Lives, the Earth Thrives) was completed in 2011. It is located in the Kapalama community in downtown Honolulu. It measures two stories high and almost two hundred feet long. [4] The mural is anchored by a portrait of Hawaii’s last ruling monarch, Queen Liliʻuokalani. This reflects the native Hawaiian’s resistance to the colonization of their sovereign nation and the loyalty and respect they have for her. On the right side of the mural the land is represented as it was naturally and on the left side it is depicted as it could be if restored through responsible stewardship. Murals like this one have served to draw attention to the importance of environmental responsibility. They also draw communities together for a cause and serve as effective educational devices.

Aside from his big murals, he also runs a company called Samurai Graphix that creates stencils of famous people and is later beneficial for non profits or other causes.

=== Estria Invitational Graffiti Battle ===
In 2007, Estria co-founded the Estria Invitational Graffiti Battle, a nationwide urban art competition that honors and advances creativity in the hip hop arts. He selects the contestants and judges, creates the activities for each city, builds vision, and finds and selects partners. The concept behind every battle is positive messaging, pushing graffiti artists to concentrate on the intent and meaning behind their work. Another force behind the battle is to encourage groups typically marginalized from graffiti culture, specifically women, to compete in painting and in judging.

== Films ==
- Piece by Piece (2005 documentary)
- Mele Murals (2016 documentary)
