= Phase 2 (artist) =

American graffiti artist (1955–2019)

Phase 2 UGA
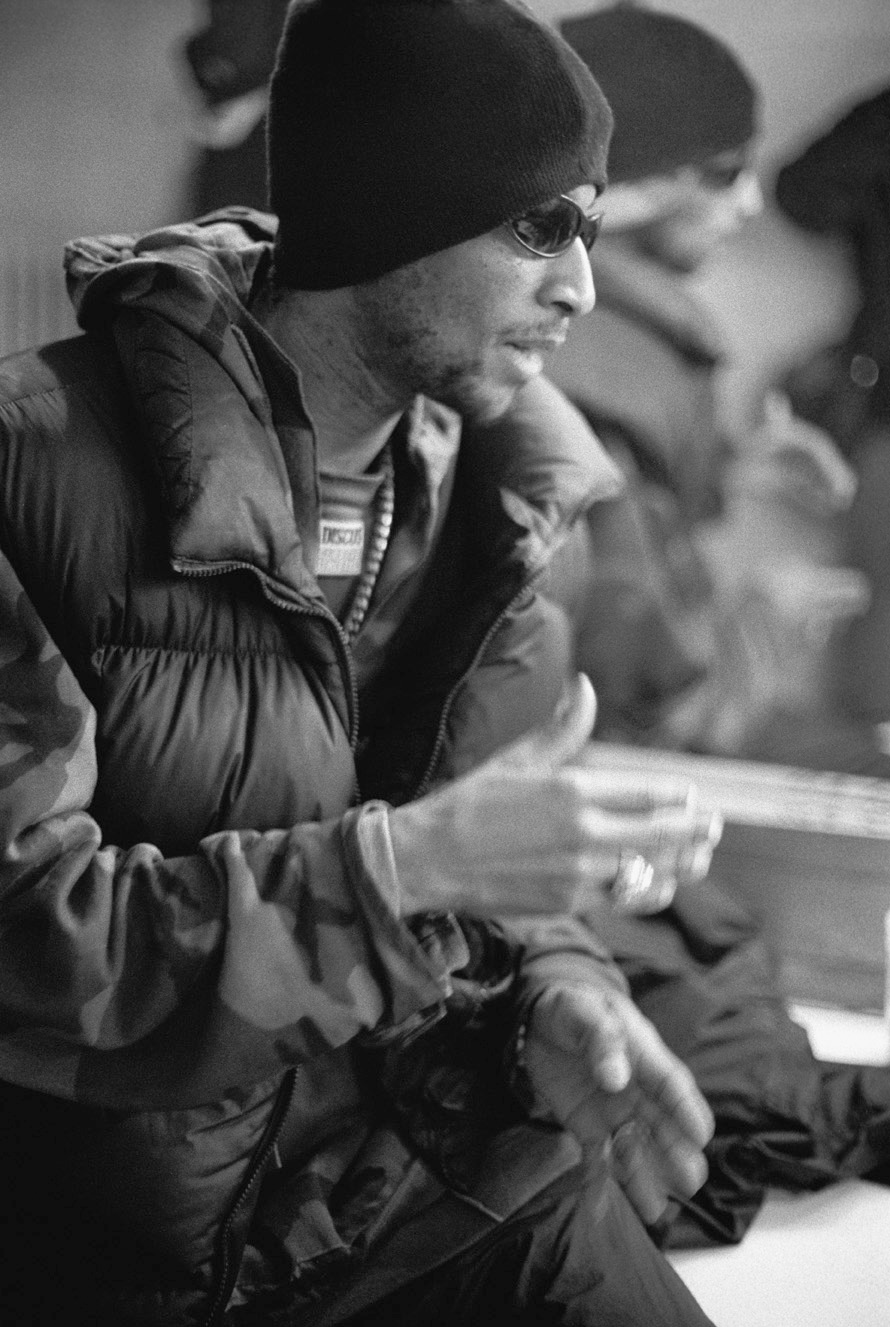
- PHASE 2 in 1999
- Born: Michael Lawrence Marrow; August 2, 1955; New York City, U.S.
- Died: December 12, 2019 (aged 64); New York City, U.S.

Michael Lawrence Marrow (August 2, 1955 – December 12, 2019), known as PHASE 2 and Lonny Wood, was a self-described aerosol paint artist based in New York City. Mostly active in the 1970s, Phase 2 is generally credited with originating the "bubble letter" style of aerosol writing, also known as "softies".

== Early life ==
Born to John Thomas Marrow and Adele "Crichlow" Marrow, he was a native of The Bronx, New York City, and raised in Morrisania, Bronx. He attended DeWitt Clinton High School. Many famous graffiti writers of the early 1970s would meet at a doughnut shop across from the school before heading down to the 149th Street–Grand Concourse station to watch tagged trains on the IRT subway lines pass.

He began writing in late 1971 under the name Phase 2. Part of the appeal of aerosol writing for Phase 2 was that it allowed him to get his "name" known, yet remain anonymous. He noted later that tagging provided disadvantaged urban teens "the only significant vehicle to represent their existence."

== Career ==
Example of a PHASE 2 piece on a subway car, utilizing the bubble letter style

In late 1972, Phase 2 first used an early version of the "bubble letter" or "softie", a style of writing which would become extremely influential and is considered a "giant leap" in the art form. The puffed-out, marshmallow-like letters drawn by Phase 2 were soon copied by other artists who added their own variations. Phase 2 quickly embellished on his original form, creating and naming dozens of varieties of softies, such as "phasemagorical phantastic" (bubble letters with stars), "bubble cloud", and "bubble drip". He described the thrill of tagging subway cars as "impact expressionalism". He is also credited with having pioneered the use of arrows in graffiti writing around this same time. Hip-hop journalist Jeff Chang has noted that Phase 2's canvasses from 1973 have "been widely recognized as defining the early genre."

Over time Phase's work become more complex, moving away from the simple tags of the early 1970s to "hieroglyphical calligraphic abstraction." In 1975, he joined the newly created United Graffiti Artists, a professional aerosol writer collective that began to attract media attention. He was featured in an essay on graffiti art by Richard Goldstein, which appeared in New York magazine.

In 1986, Phase 2 became the art director of International Get Hip Times, the first 'zine about aerosol culture.

Phase participated in hip-hop shows organized by Kool Lady Blue during the summer of 1982 at The Roxy in Chelsea, Manhattan. These shows brought together the top DJ's, rappers, break-dancers, and aerosol artists from the South Bronx and introduced hip-hop music and culture to the downtown punk and new wave scenes. Phase 2 designed the flyers for these events and often created aerosol pieces live on stage. He was also part of the first "international" hip-hop tour when stars from the Roxy performances toured in England and France.

In 1982, as part of his involvement with the Roxy scene, Phase 2 released two rap singles. "Beach Boy" was a collaboration with Barry Michael Cooper, who later wrote the script for New Jack City. "The Roxy" featured the Bill Laswell-led group, Material, and Grand Mixer DXT.

Phase 2 was also a b-boy and claimed that his dance crew pioneered the uprock (or "battle rock") style of dance, despite claims that it originated in Brooklyn.

Along with Michael Holman, Phase 2 helped form the pioneering break dance crew, The New York City Breakers, and gave the crew their name. Phase 2 made numerous flyers for Holman's hip hop events and many other hip hop events, and was the first person to use the term "hip hop" on a flyer. Holman: "Phase 2 was a good friend and a good person who cared deeply for other people and the culture (hip hop, aerosol/graffiti) he was greatly responsible for creating. He spent a lot of time educating people like me who were eager to learn more about hip hop culture, back in the early 1980s. He will be missed, dearly."

Phase 2 was the first to create a large-scale, three-dimensional graffiti/aerosol sculpture. The piece stood over 6 feet high and was made of brushed steel. The sculpture stood for years in the Jacob Javits Center. It was accidentally removed and destroyed during a reconstruction of the center.

Though he did not have a role in the production, Phase 2 did apparently influence the classic early hip-hop movie Wild Style. In the DVD commentary for the film, director Charlie Ahearn explained that, when thinking about the key character named "Phade", he had Phase 2 in mind. The role was played by Fab 5 Freddy, also a graffiti artist. Phase 2 later worked as a consultant on the 1984 movie, Beat Street.

In February 2025, Italian art restorer Antonio Rava and his son Leone finished their project to uncover a mural by Phase 2 in the Vrij Paleis ('Free Palace'), an art and culture community center in Amsterdam. Phase 2 had sprayed the mural on an inner wall in 1992, but it had been painted over in 2015.

== Personal life ==
Marrow died on December 12, 2019, at age 64 in New York City, after suffering from amyotrophic lateral sclerosis.

== Works cited ==
- George, Nelson (2001). Buppies, B-boys, Baps & Bohos: Notes on Post-Soul Black Culture. Da Capo Press. ISBN 0-306-81027-1.
- Chang, Jeff (2005). Can't Stop Won't Stop: A History of the Hip-Hop Generation. Picador. ISBN 0-312-42579-1.
- Castleman, Craig (1982). Getting Up: Subway Graffiti in New York. MIT Press. ISBN 0-262-53051-1.
