= Mook (Pittsburgh graffiti artist) =

Pittsburgh graffiti artist

Mook VK
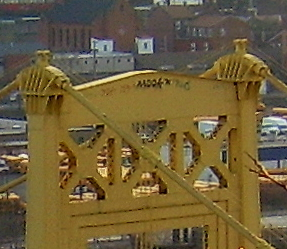
- Views of Mook's work Close-up on "Mook" tag on South Tenth Street Bridge view of bridgework Monack vandalized
- Born: Michael Monack; 1982 or 1983 (age 43–44)
- Movement: Graffiti

Mook is the pseudonymous tag of a Pittsburgh, Pennsylvania man Michael Monack.

== Biography ==
Monack's first graffiti was tagging the South Side and Shadyside neighborhoods, but after his tags were abated, he began placing his tags in hard to reach places, including tall bridges and highway overpasses. Monack was known to use the monikers "Mook" as well as "human hater". He was a part of a graffiti crew that called themselves the "Value Krew" or VK. The name means "knucklehead or idiot". He was an active graffiti writer in Pittsburgh from 1997 to early 2000s. He drew the ire of the then-Pittsburgh Mayor Thomas J. Murphy, Jr., who had tried to provide an outlet for individuals interested in graffiti to use the walls along the Eliza Furnace trail. He has etched "Mook" onto a Department of Public Works "Graffiti Busters" truck that was tasked with cleaning up graffiti. At one point, merchants from the South Side, tired of having their businesses targeted confronted Monack. He tagged "So you want to get tough?" on the Birmingham Bridge in response. Monack became known around the community for vandalizing previously unheard of places. According to Pittsburgh officials, "He's going into areas no one's gone before." He became known among law enforcement across Pennsylvania. After the media coverage of Monack's "Mook" tagging in the Pittsburgh area, it is possible that multiple copycats have applied graffiti using the moniker "Mook". As Monack received more coverage for his daredevil mischief, handful of letters have been sent to the newspaper editors from opponents as well as supporters.

== Legal issues ==
On October 31, 2001, police arrested 18-year-old South Side resident Michael Monack and arraigned him on three counts of receiving stolen property. Police were led to his grandmother's house by an anonymous letter and other clues. On October 16, the police executed a search warrant at Monack's residence and found paint and other graffiti supplies. He was supposed to turn himself in on October 19, but he had fled the area instead. In October 2002, he was sentenced to thousands of dollars in fines and community service in exchange for his guilty plea to criminal mischief and defiant trespass. In March 2003, police arrested Monack again for continuing to engage in graffiti. Monack was spotted in the Armstrong Tunnel at 5 am with two juvenile delinquents. He attempted to escape apprehension and fled to the South Tenth Street Bridge where he was arrested. Monack was charged with criminal mischief, conspiracy, possessing an instrument of a crime and corruption of a minor for being the group's "ringleader." His hearings were attended by neighborhood activists from areas he tagged. At the hearing, they expressed extreme displeasure at his behavior. During a 2002 hearing Judge Robert E. Colville said: “You’re not a criminal … but there’s some portion of you that may be brain dead.”

== After graffiti ==
As of 2004, Monack had become a tattoo artist in Pittsburgh. When asked by the Pittsburgh Tribune-Review about his opinion on the latest crop of the city's graffiti artists, he described them as "garbage." Though, even years after ceasing his tagging, Mook's "infamy precedes him in many circles of the city."
