= Graffiti in New York City =

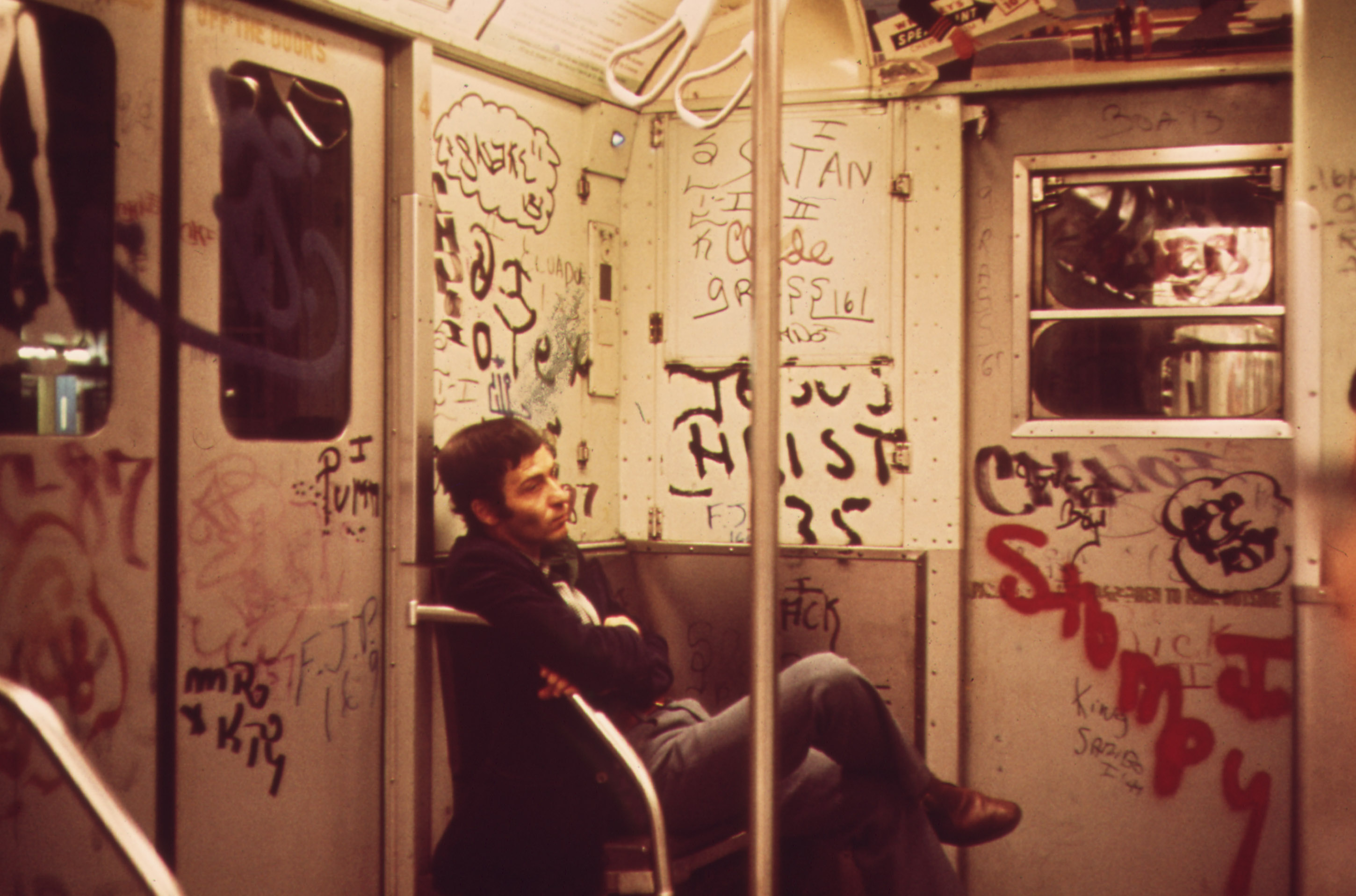
Heavily tagged New York City Subway car in 1973

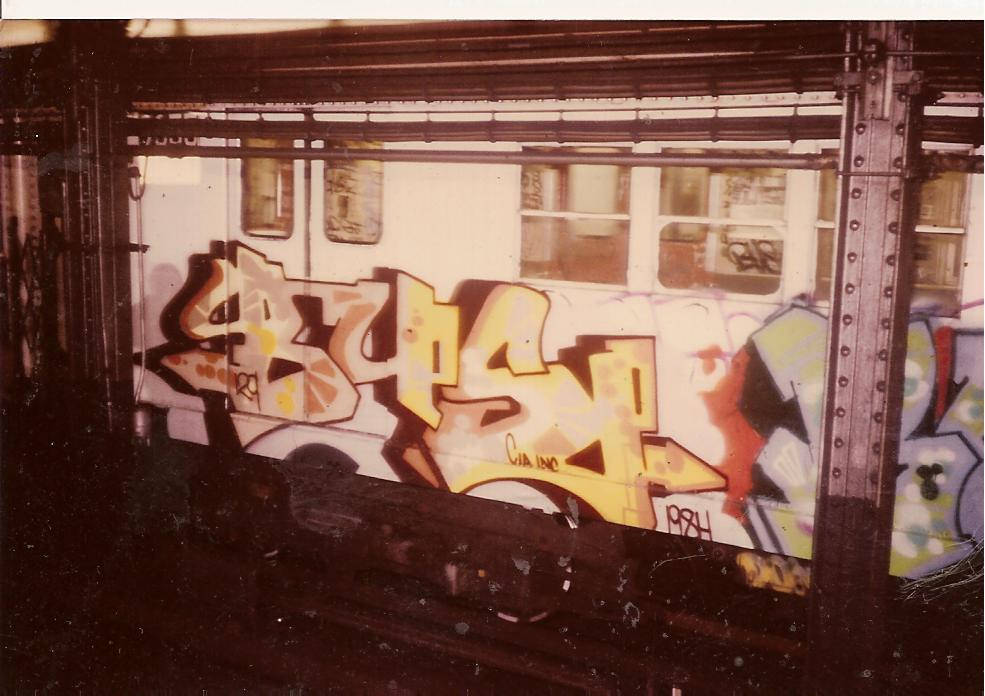
Bus129 by DONDI on a New York City Subway car, 1984

Graffiti in New York City has had a substantial local, national, and international influence. During the late 1960s and 1970s, graffiti emerged primarily throughout the city of New York's subway system and as well as throughout working-class neighborhoods. New York City being widely regarded as the birthplace of modern graffiti culture, graffiti in New York City developed into a more defined, visual practice, aided by the widespread use of aerosol spray paint, which allowed for faster and more visible marking of urban surfaces. Writers increasingly emphasized stylistic variation in lettering, treating names as visual identities and contributing to distinct writing styles across the city, while also functioning as a form of informal urban communication through a repeated exposure.

By the mid-to-late 1970s, graffiti became associated with youth cultural production outside institutional art spaces and grew increasingly visually complex, laying the foundation for later stylistic development. Graffiti has continued to influence contemporary street art, the multifaceted worlds of fashion, graphic design, advertising, as well as popular culture. Although subway graffiti declined significantly after the late 1980s, murals and street art remain visible throughout New York City.

== Beginnings and growth ==
Graffiti began appearing around New York City with the words "Bird Lives" in 1955 following the death of jazz musician Charlie Parker, in a street art campaign started by artist and poet Ted Joans. Early graffiti was not explicitly ideological or political. Originally, the two main types of people who engaged in writing graffiti were "territory markers" largely affiliated with neighborhood gangs, and "loners". Loners were the first to only write their names strictly for recognition, and it was in Philadelphia in the mid 1960s that the first loner graffiti writers began to adopt larger than life signatures, such as Cornbread and Cool Earl. Many of the early participants in name based graffiti writing engaged in the practice as an alternative to gangs and drugs.

Graffiti that marked gang territory, social protest, and anti-war sentiments became more popular in New York City in the late 1960s. The term graffiti comes from the Italian root graffito (to scratch), and one of the earliest widely recognized graffiti tags in New York was the word Pray, seen scratched into walls, doors, columns, posts, and telephone booths for many years. Members of the initial generation of graffiti artists in New York largely agree that Pray was the first ubiquitous example of graffiti in the era, and while the true identity of the person behind the Pray tag is unknown, the accepted legend is that she was a "little old lady" who held up a newspaper for concealment while scratching the word.

The New York City graffiti phenomenon of the 1970s was originally known as "wall writing" and began on school and playground walls by teenagers. As the phenomenon grew in popularity, so did its presence around the city as participants began to venture outside their neighborhoods. Early graffiti writer Taki 183 is recognized as the most notable pioneer of this because of his job as a bicycle messenger and the 1971 New York Times article featuring him. Other notable first generation graffiti artists from this time include: Angel 136, C.A.T. 87, Cay 161, Clyde, Julio 204, Snake I, Spade 130, Stich I, Tracy 168, and Yanqui 135. Over time, these individuals progressed to writing graffiti on subway trains for greater exposure. This in turn led to the development of several "writer's corners" in various subway stations around the city that acted as meeting points for practice, socialization, exchanges of ideas and styles, with the most legendary being at the 149th St. Grand Concourse station in The Bronx. As writers became familiar with one another, they began to organize groups (commonly called crews). Writers generally put the name or initials of their crew at the bottom of their own name, with the earliest crews including the Ex Vandals, Wanted club, Broadway Boys, Ebony Dukes, Wild Style, Masterpiece Crew, Out to Bomb, and many more.

Graffiti was growing competitive and artists desired to see their names across the city. Around 1974 people like Tracy 168, CLIFF 159, QUIK and BLADE ONE started to create works with more than just their names: they added illustrations, full of scenery and cartoon characters, to their tags, laying the groundwork for later subway car murals. The standards from the early 1970s continued to evolve, and the late 1970s and early 1980s saw new styles and ideas. As graffiti spread beyond Washington Heights and the Bronx, a graffiti crime wave was born. Fab 5 Freddy (Friendly Freddie, Fred Brathwaite) was one of the most notorious graffiti figures of that era. He notes how differences in spray technique and letters between Upper Manhattan and Brooklyn began to merge in the late 1970s: "out of that came 'Wild Style'". Fab 5 Freddy is often credited with helping to spread the influence of graffiti and rap music beyond its early foundations in the Bronx, and making links in the mostly white downtown art and music scenes. It was around this time that the established art world started becoming receptive to the graffiti culture for the first time since Hugo Martinez's Razor Gallery in the early 1970s. In 1979, Fab 5 Freddy and his graffiti partner, Lee Quiñones, showed their work in the Galleria La Medusa, in Rome, thereby putting graffiti on the art-world map.

The growth of graffiti in New York City was enabled by its subway system, whose accessibility and interconnectedness emboldened the movement, who now often operated through coordinated efforts. It was further left unchecked due to the budgetary restraints on New York City, which limited its ability to remove graffiti and perform transit maintenance. Mayor John Lindsay declared the first war on graffiti in 1972, but it would be a while before the city was able and willing to dedicate enough resources to that problem to start impacting the growing subculture.

The Abraham Beame Administration established a police squad of about 10 police officers to work in anti graffiti capacity. The squad attended informal meetings and socialized with minor suspects to gather information to help them apprehend leaders. Although the squad gathered information on thousands of graffiti vandals, inadequate manpower prevented them from following through with arrests.

Graffiti vandal arrests in New York City were reported at around 4,500 between 1972 and 1974, 998 in 1976, 578 in 1977, 272 in 1978, and 205 in 1979.

== Social perspective of street art ==
Scholars have noted that the early New York City graffiti movement was largely shaped by African American and Puerto Rican youth from working-class neighborhoods in the Bronx, Manhattan, Brooklyn, and Queens, pioneering the landscape for modernized graffiti. Graffiti also reflected the dense social geography of New York City where the proximity and daily movement between neighborhoods allowed visual styles to circulate quickly across different boroughs. This mobility contributed to graffiti functioning as a shared urban language shaped by interaction visibility and repetition rather than formal artistic training.

As graffiti continuously evolved following TAKI 183 and Tracy 168's activity at the start of the 1970s, so did the general perspective on graffiti as an art form. Despite significant financial and legal attempts to erase graffiti by upper class New Yorkers throughout the 1970s, hip-hop culture and American-inspired foreign artists continued to deepen the value of graffiti as a conventional mean of expression and protest. The presence of graffiti at the Berlin Wall and throughout South American countries facing political violence, incentivized American artists to continue to revolt against systematic quandaries.

As years passed, graffiti-covered murals and trains integrated the global perspective of New York City, which only grew with the rise of films and music videos set in New York. By the 1980s the cultural content of graffiti sparked an economical interest from local property owners. Aiming to use them to advertise stores or neighborhoods, graffiti soon became a landmark of its own, used to allure tourists to some of the more better-known pieces. However, as graffiti made its way into reputable art galleries and other public outlets, a divide was made between artists who emphasized expression and those who emphasized professionalism. Upper class New Yorkers who once belittled street art, were now advocating for it as a valuable and provocative art form. Despite the newly found appreciation for street art, political movements against graffiti continued to rise for the next couple of decades, and political opposition against graffiti still prevails today.

Moral panic became widespread as local governmental figures cracked down on graffiti, discouraging artists through legal persecution and public disdain. Throughout the 1990s and early 2000s, the overwhelming majority of New York City's mayoral candidates campaigned publicly opposing graffiti. The Dinkins, Giuliani, and Bloomberg administrations introduced laws targeted towards graffiti artists. Although a large proportion of New York residents celebrated the complete embargo of graffiti art, New York slums and under policed neighborhoods experienced a surge of graffiti following the implementation of the aforementioned administration's laws. The next couple years, criminologists began to associate graffiti with the broken windows theory, further intensifying the negative perspective New Yorkers had on graffiti. The presence of gang graffiti followed a similar structure to traditional street art, yet its motives and end-goals differed. Within cosmopolitan neighborhoods far from business districts, graffiti began to be associated with gang activity; the presence of graffiti, regardless of who authored it, enticed numerous criminal organizations to operate in these tension zones. Following the rise of gang-related graffiti markings, numerous social and financial strategies were employed to combat graffiti, including contracting private cleanup companies for hundreds of thousands of dollars. Even with significant professional support, combating graffiti felt effortless according to members of the New York State Department of Transportation.

== Decline of New York City graffiti subculture: Enforcement and control ==
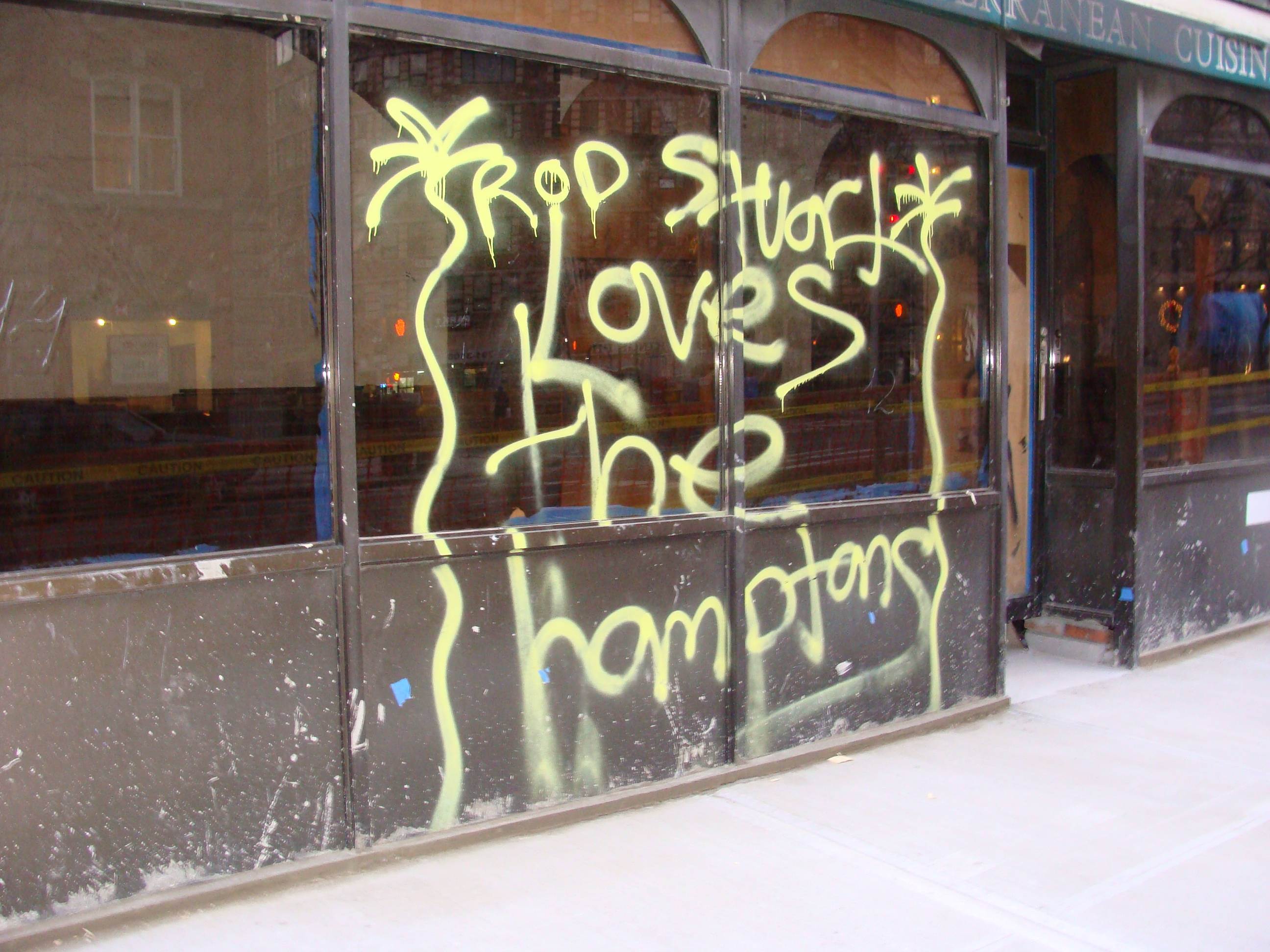
Storefront graffiti of a restaurant in Chinatown, Manhattan

As graffiti became associated with crime, many demanded that the government take a more serious stance towards it, particularly after the popularization of broken windows theory. By the 1980s, increased police surveillance and implementation of increased security measures (razor wire, guard dogs) combined with continuous efforts to clean it up led to the weakening of New York's graffiti subculture. As a result of subways being harder to paint, more writers went into the streets, which is now, along with commuter trains and box cars, the most prevalent form of writing. But the streets became more dangerous due to the burgeoning crack epidemic, legislation was underway to make penalties for graffiti artists more severe, and restrictions on paint sale and display made obtaining materials difficult.

Many graffiti artists, however, chose to see the new problems as a challenge rather than a reason to quit. A downside to these challenges was that the artists became very territorial of good writing spots, and strength and unity in numbers (gangs) became increasingly important. This was stated to be the end for the casual subway graffiti artists.

In 1984, the New York City Transit Authority (NYCTA) began a five-year program to eradicate graffiti. The years between 1985 and 1989 became known as the "diehard" era. A last shot for the graffiti artists of this time was in the form of subway cars destined for the scrap yard. With the increased security, the culture had taken a step back. The previous elaborate "burners" on the outside of cars were now marred with simplistic marker tags which often soaked through the paint.

By mid-1986, the Metropolitan Transportation Authority (MTA) and the NYCTA were winning their "war on graffiti", with the last graffitied train removed from service in 1989. As the population of artists lowered so did the violence associated with graffiti crews and "bombing". However, teenagers from inner London and other European cities with family and other links to New York City had by this time taken up some of the traditions of subway Graffiti and exported them home, although New York City writers like Brim, Bio, and Futura had themselves played a significant role in establishing such links when they visited London in the early-to-mid-1980s and "put up pieces" on or near the western ends of the Metropolitan line, outside London.

Almost as significantly, just when subway graffiti was on the decline in New York City, some British teenagers who had spent time with family in Queens and the Bronx returned to London with a "mission" to Americanize the London Underground Limited (LUL) through painting New York City–style graffiti on trains. These small groups of London "train writers" (LUL writers) adopted many of the styles and lifestyles of their New York City forebears, painting graffiti train pieces and in general "bombing" the system, but favoring only a few selected underground lines seen as most suitable for train graffiti. Although on a substantially smaller scale than what had existed in New York City, graffiti on LUL rolling stock became seen as enough of a problem by the mid-1980s to provoke the British Transport Police to establish its own graffiti squad modeled directly on and in consultation with that of the MTA. At the same time, graffiti art on LUL trains generated some interest in the media and arts, leading to several art galleries putting on exhibitions of some of the art work (on canvass) of a few LUL writers as well as TV documentaries on London hip-hop culture like the BBC's Bad Meaning Good, which included a section featuring interviews with LUL writers and a few examples of their pieces.

== Clean Train Movement era ==
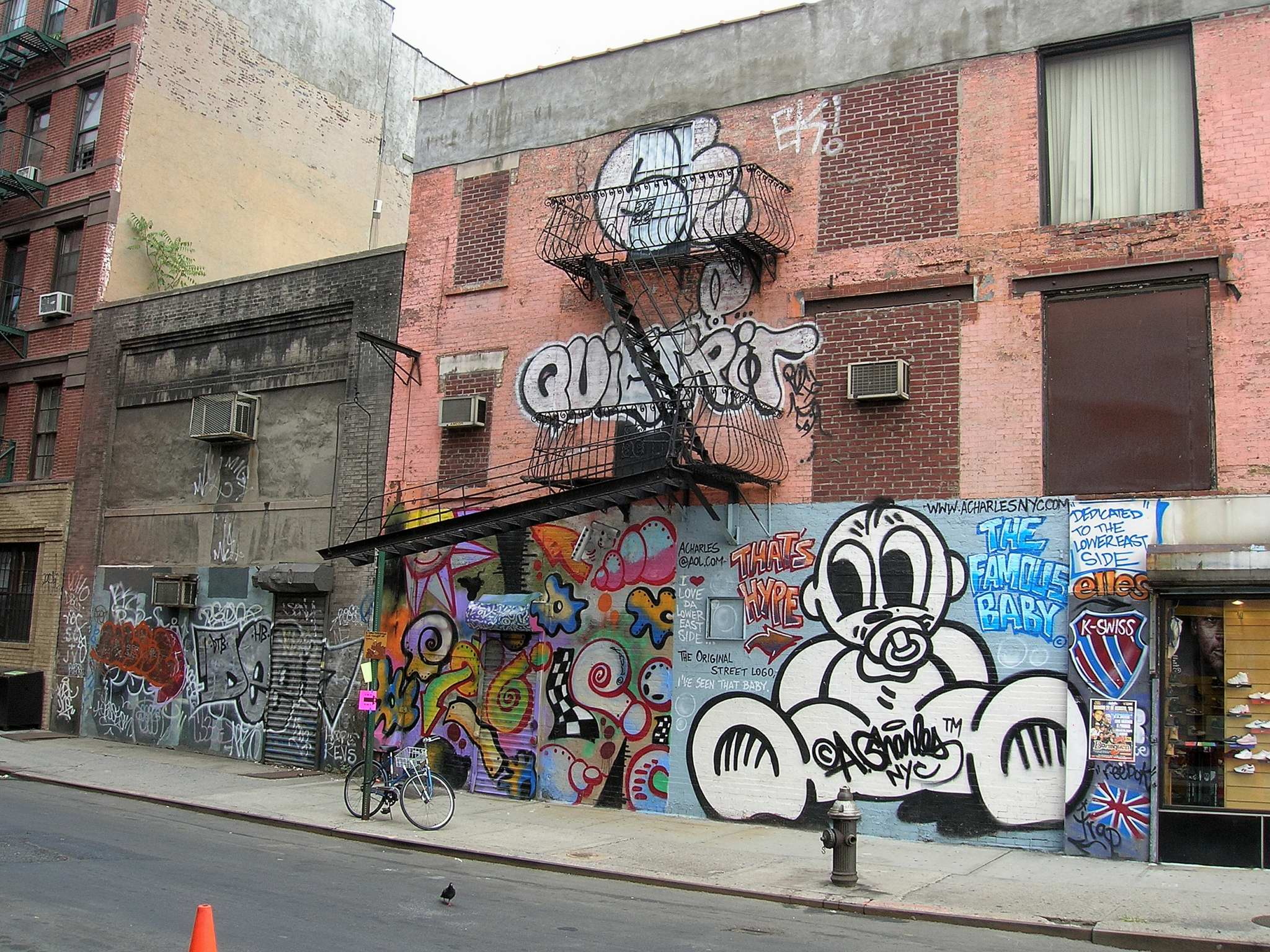
Graffiti on the Lower East Side

During the 1970s and 1980s, New York City officials and the Metropolitan Transportation Authority (MTA) characterized graffiti as vandalism and a symbol of urban disorder amongst the people and public property. Anti-graffiti measures included increased policing throughout all five boroughs, which consisted of fenced train yards, chemical cleaning systems, as well as surveillance programs to help combat against such acts.

The Clean Train Movement, wherein the rolling stock was either cleaned or outright replaced, started in 1985, with the last graffiti-covered train out of service by 1989. With subway trains being increasingly inaccessible, other property became the targets of graffiti. Rooftops became the new billboards for some 1980s-era writers. The current era in graffiti is characterized by a majority of graffiti artists moving from subway or train cars to "street galleries". Prior to the Clean Train Movement, the streets were largely left untouched not only in New York City, but in other major American cities as well. After the transit company began diligently cleaning their trains, graffiti burst onto the streets of America to an unappreciative public.

Graffiti born in the South Bronx spread across the country, covering buildings, bridges and highways in every urban center. From Philadelphia to Santa Barbara, California, the annual costs of cleaning up after the underground artists have soared into the billions.

Meanwhile, in New York in 1995, Mayor Rudolph Giuliani set up the Anti-Graffiti Task Force, a multi-agency initiative to combat graffiti in New York City. This began a crackdown on "quality-of-life crimes" throughout the city, and one of the largest anti-graffiti campaigns in U.S. history. That same year Title 10-117 of the New York Administrative Code banned the sale of aerosol spray-paint cans to children under 18. The law also requires that merchants who sell spray paint must either lock it in a case or display the cans behind a counter, out of reach of potential shoplifters. Violations of the city's anti-graffiti law carry fines of US$350 per incident.

On January 1, 2006, in New York City, legislation created by Councilmember Peter Vallone, Jr. attempted to raise the minimum age for possession of spray paint or permanent markers from 18 to 21. The law prompted outrage by fashion and media mogul Marc Ecko who sued Mayor Michael Bloomberg and Councilmember Vallone on behalf of art students and "legitimate" graffiti artists. On May 1, 2006, Judge George B. Daniels granted the plaintiffs' request for a preliminary injunction against the recent amendments to the anti-graffiti legislation, effectively prohibiting the New York Police Department from enforcing the higher minimum age. A similar measure was proposed in New Castle County, Delaware in April 2006 and passed into law as a county ordinance in May 2006.

At the same time, graffiti has begun to enter mainstream. Much controversy arose on whether graffiti should be considered an actual form of art. In 1974, Norman Mailer published an essay, The Faith of Graffiti, that explores the question of graffiti as art and includes interviews from early subway train graffitists, and then New York City mayor, John Lindsey. Since the 1980s, museums and art galleries started treating graffiti seriously. Many graffiti artists had taken to displaying their works in galleries and owning their own studios. This practice started in the early 1980s with artists such as Jean-Michel Basquiat, who started out tagging locations with his signature SAMO ("Same Old Shit"), and Keith Haring, who was also able to take his art into studio spaces. In some cases, graffiti artists had achieved such elaborate graffiti (especially those done in memory of a deceased person) on storefront gates that shopkeepers have hesitated to cover them up. In the Bronx after the death of rapper Big Pun, several murals dedicated to his life done by Bio, Nicer TATS CRU appeared virtually overnight; similar outpourings occurred after the deaths of The Notorious B.I.G., Tupac Shakur, Big L, and Jam Master Jay.

== From graffiti to studio art ==
Modern street art emerged in the 1960s in the nearby city of Philadelphia. Later in the decade New York City saw a burst of graffiti activity around its transportation systems, especially the subway.

In the 1970s MTA properties were filled with graffiti and street art; it was perceived as a major social problem, and the mayor and the government got involved to counter vandalism. Graffiti was seen as the art equivalent of an unregulated free market. It spread virally as any youth with a spray can could tag the subways and the streets, and grow their reputations though graffiti. But the mayor and the government and many New Yorkers were put off by this ubiquity, so the "Anti-Graffiti Bill" of 1995 established a task force to stop graffiti in public spaces. Graffiti was perceived to be less than art, because of associations it held in many people's minds with street crime.

However, the culture of street art in New York City and elsewhere can be appreciated as much more than just tagging. As the streets of New York City may change, street art has remained a constant. Graffiti is a recognizable part of New York City culture and has contributed to the city's character and history. City residents experience graffiti through distinctive styles, traditions, and trends visible on streets across each of the five boroughs, and that have also had an influence on the wider world. There is also a recognition that the negative impact of public art without permission can be more pronounced in some social contexts than others, even if their creation is technically illegal. Especially in the 21st century, many people see a freedom of speech and expression in graffiti because of high-profile artists who have emerged from the scene, like Keith Haring and Jean-Michel Basquiat. The variety of graffiti art in New York City has become recognized as more than just vandalism, with the greater respect that has come from success in commercial art spaces.

=== Street art in museums 1980–1990 ===
By the 1980s the birth of hip hop in New York elevated graffiti from street nuisance to street art. According to Katharine Taylor, the 1980s brought a new age to the old school where everyone, no matter race or age could engage. Everyone in the music scene needed to be photographed on the street, next to or in front of graffiti. As early as 1981, graffiti took a major step forward. MoMA PS1 opened a landmark show, "New York/New Wave", curated by Diego Cortez. This was graffiti's leap into the fine art world. The show gave attention to punk rock and hip hop making graffiti legitimate. MoMA PS1 played a huge part and hosted its first ever graffiti gallery show on February 15, 1981 showcasing street style art with artists like Jean-Michel Basquiat.

In the East Village, the Fun Gallery and Rich Colicchio's 51X, which opened on St. Mark's Place in spring 1982, were enthusiastic supporters of graffiti art as a movement. Dondi, Fab Five Freddy, and Futura 2000 had one-man shows at both spaces. Leading to more expoosure of arts. These exhibitions generated excitement about graffiti art among other dealers. Fashion Moda continued to represent graffiti artists, especially those who lived in the Bronx, like Lady pink, Crash, daze and the "Gothic Futurists" Rammellzee, A-one, Koor, and Toxic. Graphiti Productions downtown in 1983, had an exhibition of gigantic female figures painted directly on the wall at Fashion Moda in late fall. The continuing success of graffiti art allowed artist in the 1990s to create a gobal phenmonen having there work commissioned on album covers and influance mainstrean tv.

In the 1990s, graffiti was a common theme seen in music videos and on a variety of television show sets and on-screen graphics. With a parallel climb to fame, Music Television (MTV) rapidly became as cool and must-see as graffiti and the cultural elements that were attached to it. National and international magazines who got the message out too.

== Graffiti styles ==
Since graffiti emerged in NYC in the 1970s, it has evolved through a range of artistic styles, with five forms becoming prominent: tags, murals, stickers, stencils, and wheatpasting.

=== Tags ===
Tags only require spray paint or a heavy-duty marker, making it easy to start in the graffiti world. Taki 183 is known of being the pioneer of this style. The tag was at first only the nickname followed from a house or street number, but with the arise of graffiti and more people being inside of this movement people started to include visual enhancements (calligraphic styles), symbolisms (as crowns) and started to play with the scale and weigh of the tags. JA has been one of New York's most prolific taggers for 20 years, the thick and curvy tag can be found on subway station walls, highway overpasses, bridges, fire hydrants and store gates, Felisbret says.

=== Murals ===
Murals, very different from the tag, large-scale works that can be called masterpieces have a complex visual weight that writers (those who do graffiti) started to use to gain more fame. There are 3 ways that writers do murals; masterpieces, top-to-bottom, mural whole cars. Masterpieces use spray caps from different types of aerosols to achieve different things adding effects and details inside the letters as polka dots, crosshatches and checkerboards. Top-to-bottom, "masterpieces" that occupied the totally heigh of a subway car, resembled the tag but later in had its own style. The mural whole cars, as its name says, a "masterpiece" that covered and entire car of a subway using a cartoon character. Murals take time. Start with outlines, fill the inside, then refine with details and effects.

Examples of murals include those of John Matos (also known as Crash), who creates Pop Art–inspired murals and whose latest work – seen on the wall at Bowery and East Houston Street – features sailor Popeye and work by Bronx group Tats Cru.

=== Stickers ===
This kind of graffiti is usually preproduced, which simplifies the distribution process. Common locations for this graffiti are lamp poles and crosswalk signals. Beyond simple decoration, it can be used as a promotion tool and brand recognition like Fumero's work. As an art-gallery-circumventing promotional tool, the sticker serves as a logo for his "Table Series" paintings, inspired by dining scenes in family photographs.

=== Stencils ===
Cutting designs on a paper, thick cardboard, plastic sheets, or acetate, that's the base of stencil. This provides an outline for the artists to quickly replicate their art. Unlike freehand graffiti, stencil graffiti produces crisp, controlled shapes but too much paint will seep under the stencil, ruining crisp lines. The range of complexity vary, going from lettering to a highly detailed and colored piece. Multi-Layered Depth: Some of the most advanced stencil graffiti involves multiple layers of cutouts, with different colors and shading, to create realistic, three-dimensional effects. In New York City, Fekner and his project Warning Signs highlighted the hazardous conditions of New York in the 70s. Logan Hicks is known for his intricate photorealistic multilayer stencils of urban environments. Originally from Baltimore, and now based in New York, Hicks is a leader in the photorealistic stencil technique, meticulously hand cutting layer after layer to build up the light, shadow, and highlights of the natural world.

=== Wheatpasting ===
This technique involves plastering sheets of paper onto a surface using and adhesive, commonly using a mix of water, flour and sugar (use wood glue for extra durability). As well as the stickers and stencils, wheatpasting allows artists to replicate a design and quickly putting it on a surface, but the difference between these three is the complexity of it. For a good result, this technique requires at least 3 persons, one person pastes, one person slaps the piece, and one keeps watch. Wheatpasting is created in a studio because of its large-scale size, and then it's paste it on a public space. Lastly, to try to prevent the art from deteriorate, use a light layer of clear acrylic spray or polyurethane to protect against rain and sun. Swoon is a leading wheatpasting artist, primarily based in New York City.

== Media ==
- New York, New York (1976) – an episode of the BBC documentary series Omnibus, telling the story of graffiti in New York, as told by New Yorkers themselves.
- Stations of the Elevated (1981) – the earliest documentary about subway graffiti in New York City, with music by Charles Mingus.
- Wild Style (1982) – a drama about hip hop and graffiti culture in New York City.
- Style Wars (1983) – an early documentary on hip hop culture, made in New York City.
- Bomb the System (2006) – a drama about a crew of graffiti artists in modern-day New York City.
- Infamy (2007) – a feature-length documentary about graffiti culture as told through the experiences of six well-known graffiti writers and a graffiti buffer.
- Bronx Aerosol Arts Documentary Project (2022) – archive of video interviews with early notable New York City graffiti artists produced by The Bronx County Historical Society.

== See also ==
- 5 Pointz
- Commercial graffiti
- The Freedom Train (graffiti)
- Freedom Tunnel
- Revs (graffiti artist)
- SAMO
- The Splasher
- Subway Art
