= Nobili =

Nobili is an Italian surname. Notable people with the surname include:

- Anna Maria Nobili (born 1949), Italian physicist
- Brian Nobili (born 1976), American photographer
- Bruno Nobili (born 1949), Italian-Venezuelan footballer and manager
- Durante Nobili, 16th-century Italian painter
- Elena Nobili (1833–1900), Italian painter
- Gilberto Nobili, Italian sailor and engineer
- Giuseppe Nobili (1877–1908) Italian zoologist
- John Nobili (1812–1856), Italian Roman Catholic priest
- Leopoldo Nobili (1784–1835), Italian physicist
- Luciano Nobili (1933–2016), Italian footballer
- Luciano Nobili (politician) (born 1977), Italian politician
- Natale Nobili (1935–2021), Italian football player and manager
- Nella Nobili (1926–1985), Italian poet and writer
- Riccardo Nobili (1859–1939), Italian painter, writer and antiquarian
- Roberto de Nobili (1577–1656), Italian Christian missionary to Southern India
- Tito Oro Nobili (1882–1967), Italian politician

== See also ==
- Nobilis (disambiguation)
- Residenza Il Castello, the residence of the family Nobili
