= Brian Nobili =

American street photographer & videographer (born 1976)

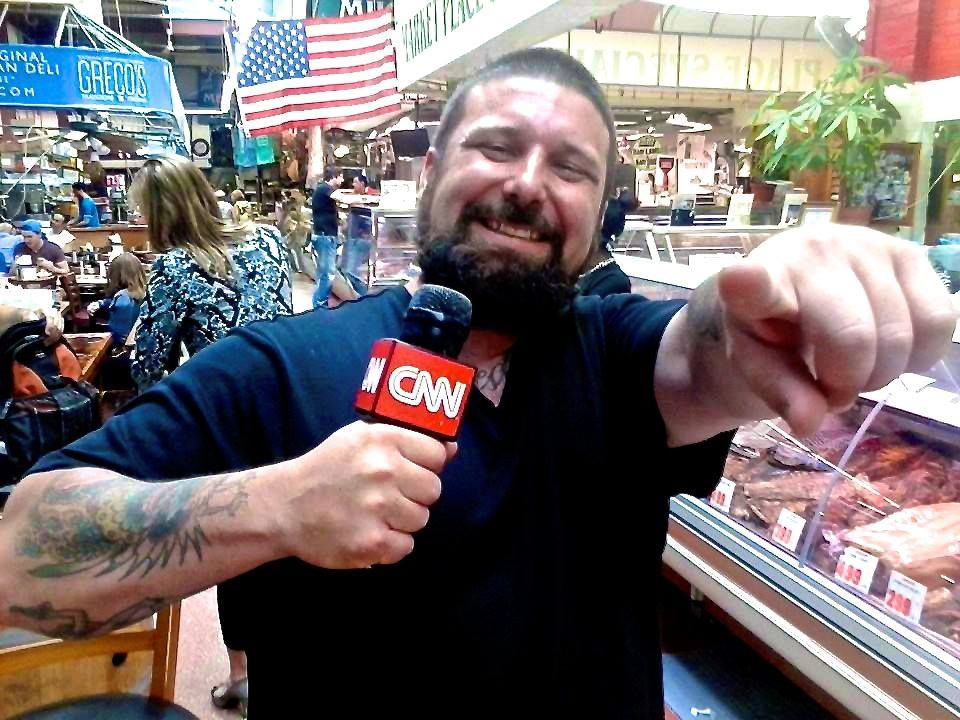
- Nobili during a CNN feature
- Born: Brian Dwels; 1976 (age 49–50); Bridgeport, Connecticut, United States
- Military career
- Allegiance: United States
- Branch: United States Navy
- Website: Brian Nobili on Instagram

Brian Nobili (Brian Dwels) (born December 21, 1976) is an American street photographer and videographer.

== Biography ==
Born in Bridgeport, Connecticut, but a long-time and current resident of The Bronx, New York, Brian is a video producer and graphic designer on the New York City street scene.

After developing a signature street style as the visual artist Brian Dwels, Nobili sought to expand his artistic repertoire and joined the US Navy, serving for eight years. While stationed in Japan, Brian emerged as a leading influence in the developing Sasebo, Nagasaki graffiti community.

His evolution into one of New York's premier street artists continued with his work at Heavy.com and his work in video production and graphic design at Tuff City Styles.

== Philosophy ==
Nobili focuses on capturing the minute aspects of New York City culture. He considers his work environmental portraiture. He has been influenced most notably by Ricky Powell and Dan Uneken, whom he met while serving in Spain. Nobili has a Ph.D. from the Rickford Institute of NYC Street Photography, founded by Ricky Powell. Brian's photography and films are well known throughout the art world and street community. His works have received news coverage from around the world.

== Works ==
=== Tuff City Styles ===
Nobili worked with Tuff City Styles as the head of the video production from July 2008 to July 2011. During these three years, he garnered numerous commendations for his work. Aside from running the Tuff City Blog, Brian documented various events. His documentary of the Tuff City Styles’ tagging of Rikers Island received international news coverage and featured some of today's most notable graffiti artists. The project continued in the summer of 2013, as members of Los Angeles-based Seventh Letter collaborated with original taggers TATS CRU and Tuff City.

After legendary graffiti writer Iz the Wiz died in June 2009, The New York Times released a blogpost about his final train bombing, which Nobili had covered.

As Tuff City Styles expanded, Nobili was instrumental in fulfilling its vision as the omnipotent source of creative street services, attracting popular artists such as Mister Cartoon, whose adventures at Tuff City Styles were chronicled by Red Bull.

Nobili maintains many relationships with renowned New York City graffiti artists, including CES, Serve, Bio (graffiti artist), Redy Roc Redz and T Kid, with whom he has frequently worked with.

=== SocialFlow ===
From July 2011 to September 2013, Nobili worked as the Director of Enlightenment at SocialFlow, a social media optimization platform based in New York City. His videos have received considerable media attention, particularly the initiative he spearheaded between Vice (magazine) and SocialFlow

=== NYCstreetphotography.com ===
In October 2012, Nobili returned to his roots, co-founding NYCstreetphotography.com with long-time friend Ricky Powell. The two seek to bring together the greats of street photography with the up-and-comer all with the purpose of preserving and documenting NYC culture.

=== Independent ===
Nobili's independent work spans a wide range of genres. He has directed music videos, in which he transcends the traditional limitations that restrain the budding director and artist.

His first DVD “Rappin’ with the Rickster” was named a must-have by Juxtapoz.

Nobili's work on a Burger King campaign while at HEAVY.com received commendation from The New York Times.

More recently, Nobili's documentation of artist Serve TCS's tribute to Elizabeth Taylor garnered coverage by News 12 the Bronx.

Nobili was a contributing photographer for the book Graffiti Tattoo: Kings on Skin.

His own graffiti writing was featured at Bridgeports Art Fest as part of the Urban Beautification & Murals Project/Graffiti Block Party.

In December 2011, Nobili was a contributing artist to TheGoodLife! presents The Rickford Institute All-Star Classic Group Photography Exhibition, curated by Ricky Powell, at Milk Studios in New York. The show was sponsored by Pony International, Kangol, Heineken International, and Frank151.

Nobili continued to collaborate with Ricky Powell with a January 2012 "The Rickster vs. Dwels"art show at Camarades el Barrio in Spanish Harlem. The show featured some of Powell’s and Dwels’ most famous and infamous photographs, reinterpreted by several artist using the photographs as a canvas and bringing a new meaning and life to each. The show included performances by DJs Bobbito García, TJ Mizell, and Smoke LES.

Most recently, Nobili has pursued his passion for photography and community through the Bronx Artist Documentary Project, or BxADP. The brainchild of Daniel Hauben, BxADP is an official Bronx Centennial Event celebrating the 100th anniversary of the creation of Bronx County and through its exhibition will highlight the diversity of local Bronx artists and photographers. The borough-wide collaborative endeavor involved 30 Bronx photographers documenting 70 Bronx visual artists at work in their studios or other Bronx venues. Nobili was responsible for working with legendary graffiti artists KingBee UW, T Kid, CES, and YES2.
