= Niardo =

Niardo Gnàrt
- Comune
- Comune di Niardo
- Location within Italy Location within Lombardy
- Coordinates: 45°58′36″N 10°20′3″E
- Country: Italy
- Region: Lombardy
- Province: Brescia (BS)

Area
  - Total: 22 km^{2} (8.5 sq mi)
- Elevation: 443 m (1,453 ft)

Population (2011)
  - Total: 1,956
  - Density: 89/km^{2} (230/sq mi)
- Time zone: UTC+1 (CET)
  - Summer (DST): UTC+2 (CEST)
- Postal code: 25050
- Dialing code: 0364
- Patron saint: Saint Obitius
- Website: Official website

Niardo (Camunian: Gnàrt) is a town and comune in the province of Brescia, in Lombardy.

Neighbouring comuni are Braone, Breno, Losine and Prestine.

It was the birthplace of Saint Obitius (Obizio), who is one of the town's patron saints.

== Geography ==
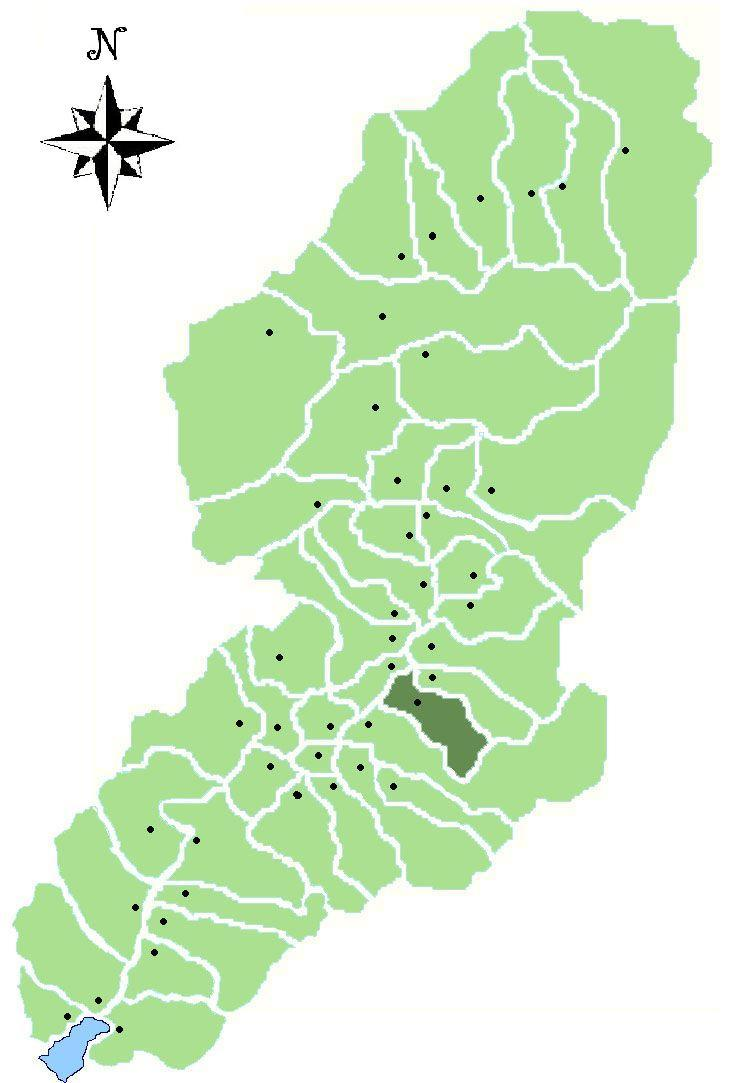
Location of Niardo in Val Camonica

=== Climate ===
Data from the weather station Niardo indicate, based on 33 years of data from 1961 to 1990, the temperature during the coldest month, January, averaged −1.0 °C (30 °F), while that of the warmest month, July, was 20.5 °C (68.9 °F).

== History ==
Historical population
Year	Pop.	±%
1861	861	—
1871	846	−1.7%
1881	866	+2.4%
1901	987	+14.0%
1911	1,100	+11.4%
1921	1,065	−3.2%
1931	1,067	+0.2%
1936	1,051	−1.5%
1951	1,225	+16.6%
1961	1,273	+3.9%
1971	1,297	+1.9%
1981	1,487	+14.6%
1991	1,704	+14.6%
2001	1,837	+7.8%
2011	1,947	+6.0%

No document certifying the country of origin clearly Niardo, but its origins are deduced from the ancient origin gives some expressions in the local dialect, which are clearly due to the language of Celtic and Latin. The Roman presence is evidenced by some place names that have reached our days without major distortions such as place names Sommavilla (Imavillae)

The presence of the Lombards, in the post-Roman and medieval times is rather well established so that the name of this country (Niward) dates from this period.

In the 11th century fighting began between Guelphs and Ghibellines, and up to 1397 fights, feuds, revenge and massacre between the Guelphs and Ghibellines remained deeply rooted in the everyday relations between the two factions and continued even when the whole came under Vallecamonica the Visconti. These unscrupulous and enterprising Milanese gentlemen were reaching the zenith of their power and their lands now included much of northern Italy. In their expansion policy immediately took advantage of the presence of delegates and the Milanese troops in Vallecamonica called to play a role as peacemakers and arbitrators, and soon became the new rulers of the area. Policy of the Visconti was almost immediately marked by encouraging the Ghibelline party to oppose the claims, the Alpine valleys of Brescia, the Curia, which was expropriated by almost all his feudal prerogatives that were bestowed to those families of local nobles who had been accommodating approach to the new master.

The famous general peace that had held the bridge of Minerva in Breno, pompously and solemnly ratified with great oaths in 1397, was short lived and feuds took up so much that in 1403, the fortress of Niardo, which stood on the "Dos del Castel", became the refuge of the usual Baroncino Nobili from Lozio, which often away from their land in the narrow and well defended Lozio valley, just niardese departed from the castle for his bloody expeditions and for the numerous raids that many deaths and property damage produced between the Ghibellines.

In 1428 the Republic of Venice, after several clashes with the forces of the Duchy of Milan, won the Vallecamonica. The events of this war Milanese-Veneto long and continued with varying fortunes, the Valley was conquered in 1438 by Milan, Venice regained the same year, the riperse in 1453, but then, with the Peace of Lodi, all the valleys of Brescia finally passed under the Republic of San Marco that he applied immediately to its constitution and its laws that greatly limited the power of feudal lords and noble families.

In 1530, for six months, plague struck the area and there were numerous victims among the inhabitants of Niardo. Exactly one hundred years later, in 1630 the country was invaded by hordes of Landsknecht that spread through the valley to the plain, left, as a remembrance of their fatal passage, in addition to the complete dispossession of property and many acts of violence, even the terrible and famous pestilential epidemic, which lasted almost two years and that many victims had reduced by almost one third of the inhabitants of the country.

In 1797 the Venetian Republic fell with the arrival of Napoleon's campaign in Italy, and Niardo was incorporated into the Cisalpine Republic.

In 1815, 1816 and in 1817 these social ills and economic destroyed much of the social fabric of the valley and perhaps were the initial condition for the emergence of terrible epidemics (typhus, smallpox, etc.) which cut many inhabitants. Niardo then became part of the Lombard-Venetian kingdom, for that very reason during the Italian Risorgimento, niardesi supported the intervention of Savoy at the expense of Austria Niardo was annexed to the Kingdom of Italy in 1859

In the 20th century, the small country has followed the historical and political events of the neighboring villages, and only to the 1970s a good building development, especially towards the south-west and in areas overlooking the main road of the valley, the ancient village that has expanded in its historical center preserves the homes of the ancient and noble families niardesi.

In 1986 the country suffered a tremendous flood which killed 2 people.

=== Local landowners ===
Families who have received episcopale feoffment of the country by the Bishop of Brescia:

Family	Blazon	Period
Adami		1374 – ?
Nobili		1494–1600

=== Arms ===
The arms of Niardo consists of green and the Knight with Sword:

"Field of Heaven, the St. Obizio on horseback, facing, holding a sword with the point downwards, all natural. The horse through the countryside of green."

=== Events ===
Each year Niardo celebrating the solemn feast of Saint Obitius, San Costanzo and Beato Innocent of Berzo, the first Sunday of May. In the solemn celebrations of the Cuirassiers of Saint Obitius escort the casket of relics in the streets of the country.

== Twin towns ==
Niardo is twinned with:

- Reggiolo, Italy, since 2012

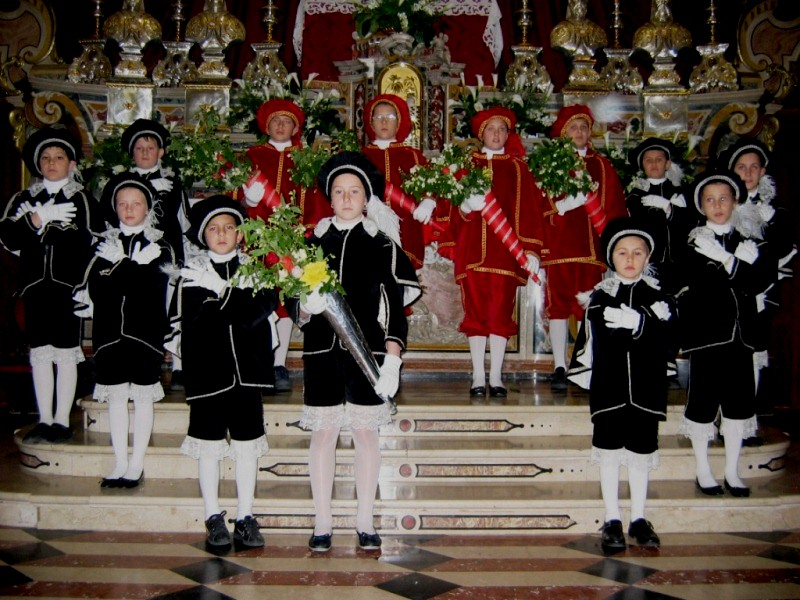
Pages

== Monuments and places of interest ==
=== Religious architecture ===
The churches of Niardo are:

- Church of St. Joseph, baroque structure that was rebuilt in 800. Located in the locality Crist.
- Cathedral of Saint Maurice, rebuilt in the early twentieth century, contains a Guardian Angel of Fiammenghino.
- Church of St. George, Church of St. George, of the fifteenth century.
- Church of the Guardian Angels, built in 1650.

== Gallery ==
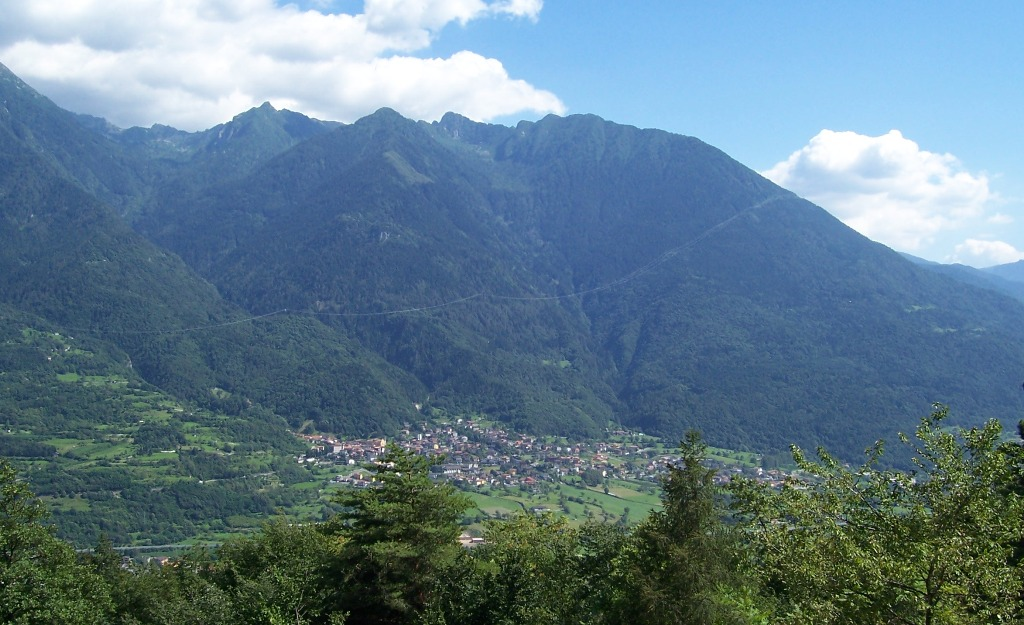
Niardo

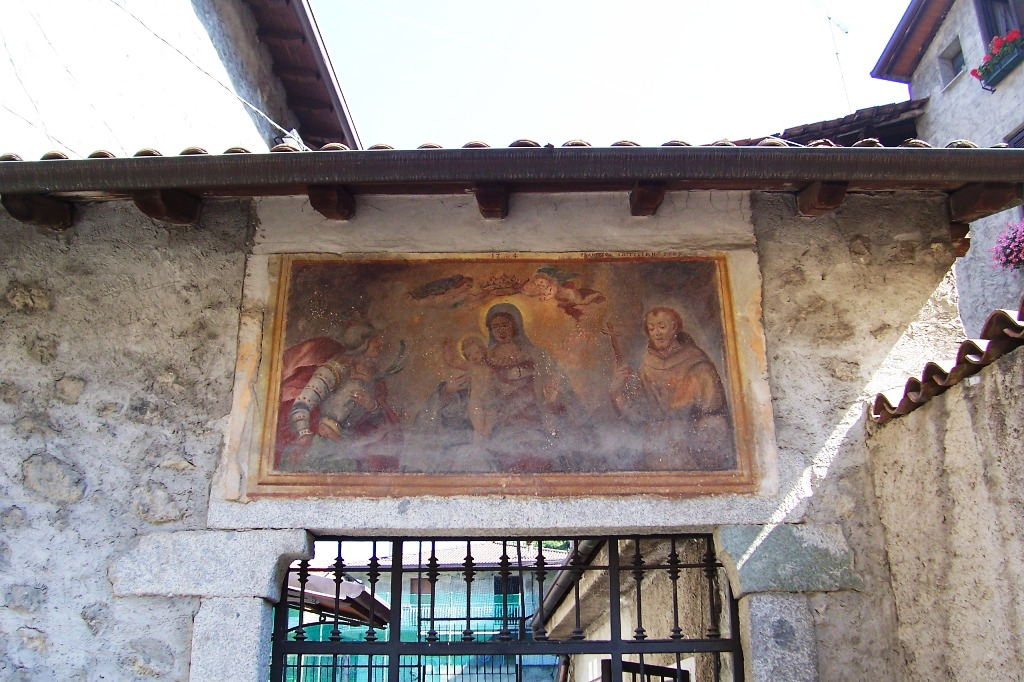

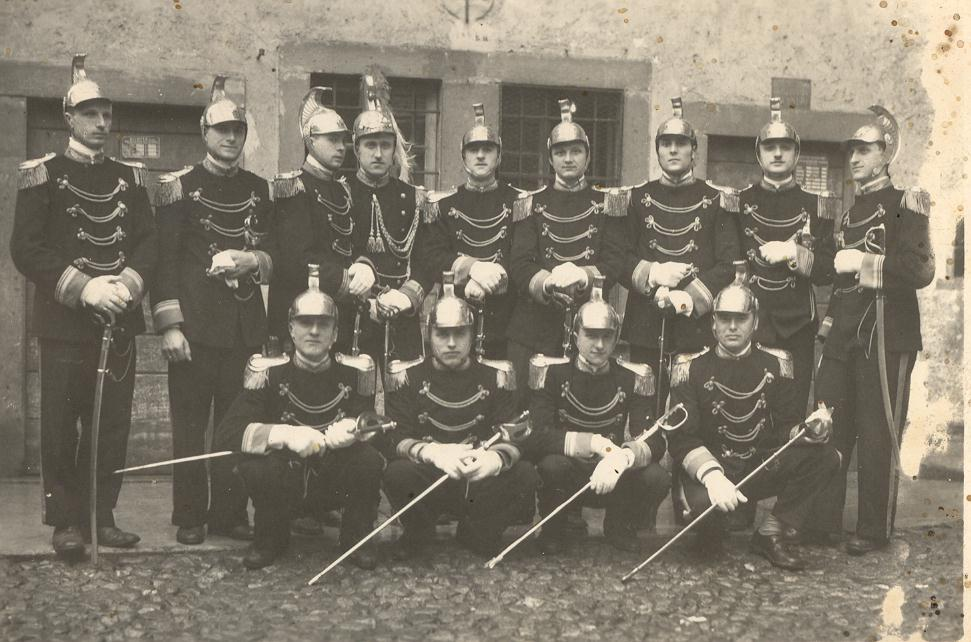
Cuirassiers

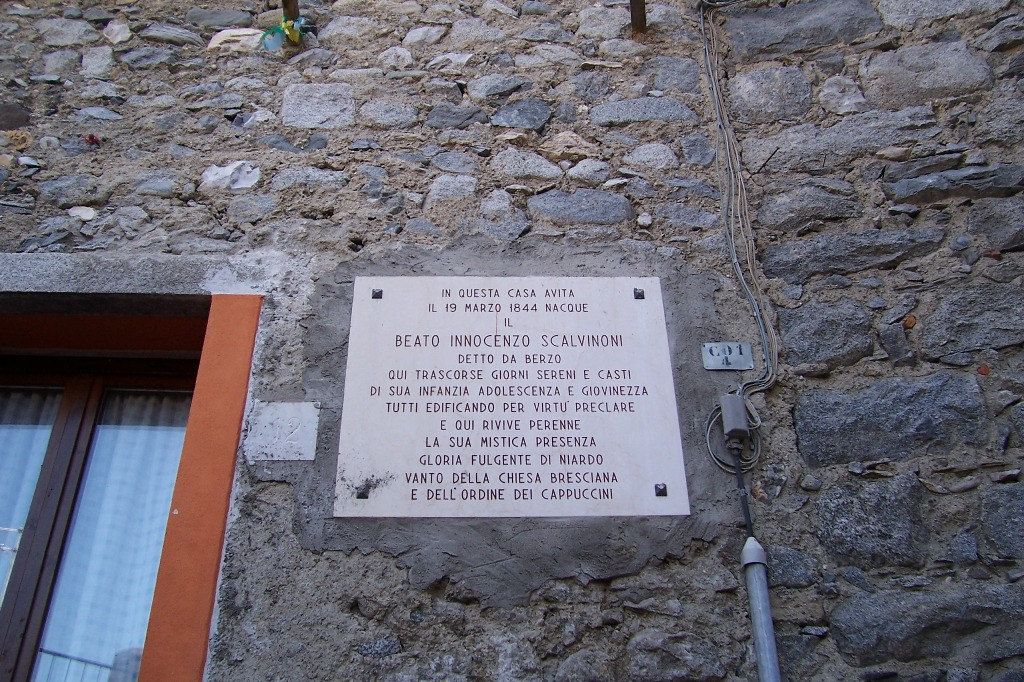
Casa natale del Beato Innocenzo

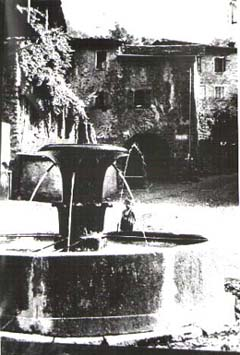
Old Photo
