= A. nobile =

A. nobile may refer to:

- Aeonium nobile, a succulent subtropical plant species
- Alangium nobile, a plant species found in Indonesia, Malaysia and Singapore

== See also ==
- Nobile (disambiguation)
