= D. nobilis =

D. nobilis may refer to:

- Deckenia nobilis, the millionaire's salad, a flowering plant species endemic to the Seychelles
- Diopsittaca nobilis, the red-shouldered macaw, a small parrot species

== See also ==
- Nobilis (disambiguation)
