= The Death of Graffiti =

1982 acrylic painting by Lady Pink

The Death of Graffiti is an acrylic painting by the graffiti artist Lady Pink. The work was completed in 1982 and measures 19 in by 22 in. Currently, the painting is in the collection of the Museum of the City of New York after being donated in 1994 as part of the Martin Wong Graffiti Collection. The Death of Graffiti has also been displayed in the Indianapolis Museum of Art at Newfields' 2017 exhibition entitled "City as Canvas: New York City Graffiti From the 70s & 80s".

Lady Pink created another version of The Death of Graffiti in 2018, titled Death of Graffiti 3. This version differs from the original in size, 72 in by 72 in, and visual elements such as the style of graffiti tags. Death of Graffiti 3 was sold by Beyond The Streets, a gallery in Los Angeles, and prints of the work have also sold at auction. The Death of Graffiti appears again in Lady Pink's portfolio as the background for Seen TC5 portrait (2021). Other elements of The Death of Graffiti, including the train cars, artist tags, and nude female figure, are frequently repeated in the artist's other works.

== Visual Description ==
The Death of Graffiti (1982) features a young, nude woman standing on top of a mountain of spray paint cans. The woman stands in the foreground of the painting and faces away from the viewer. In the middle of the canvas, she gestures toward an elevated train that passes in front of red-brick buildings of various heights and sizes. An orange and pink sky fades into the skyline and composes the background of the work. Green and brown plants surround the spray paint mountain in the bottom fourth of the painting.

Common elements of graffiti art, including artist tags, are incorporated into the image. Specifically, the artist tags of Seen and Lady Pink are visible on the train, and "PINK" is repeated on the wall splitting the two train cars. Between the two train tags, there is a scroll painted with the words "Legion of Doom © 1981". Next to Pink's tag, a portrait of a young woman is visible with the words "dedicated to my honey, Demo, with love... 'Lady Pink'" in a pink talk bubble. To the left of the portrait, "Be patient GOD isn't finished with me yet!" is visible on the train door.

== Important Elements ==
=== Nude Female Figure ===
In an interview, Lady Pink identifies the young female figure as a version of herself and highlights her excitement in seeing a blank train car that she can paint. The nude female figure is a common motif in Lady Pink's portfolio and has been perceived as a feminist statement by critics. However, Lady Pink claims that she chooses feminine figures because they are more enjoyable to draw. While the artist has stated her support for the empowerment of women and equality movements, she does not consider herself an activist or a militant feminist.

=== Train Cars and Graffiti Tags ===
Lady Pink began her graffiti career in her teens, sneaking into subway and train yards, tagging the cars with her moniker "Pink" or "Lady Pink". The artist tag acts as the artist's signature and is a recognizable form of graffiti. Even as Lady Pink transitioned away from graffiti and to murals and paintings, train cars and tags remain prevalent across her portfolio.

The Death of Graffiti, specifically, includes the tags of Lady Pink and Seen, another graffiti artist deemed the Godfather of Graffiti. Lady Pink met Seen in her first year of high school. He became one of her first graffiti teachers and gave her the name "Pink".

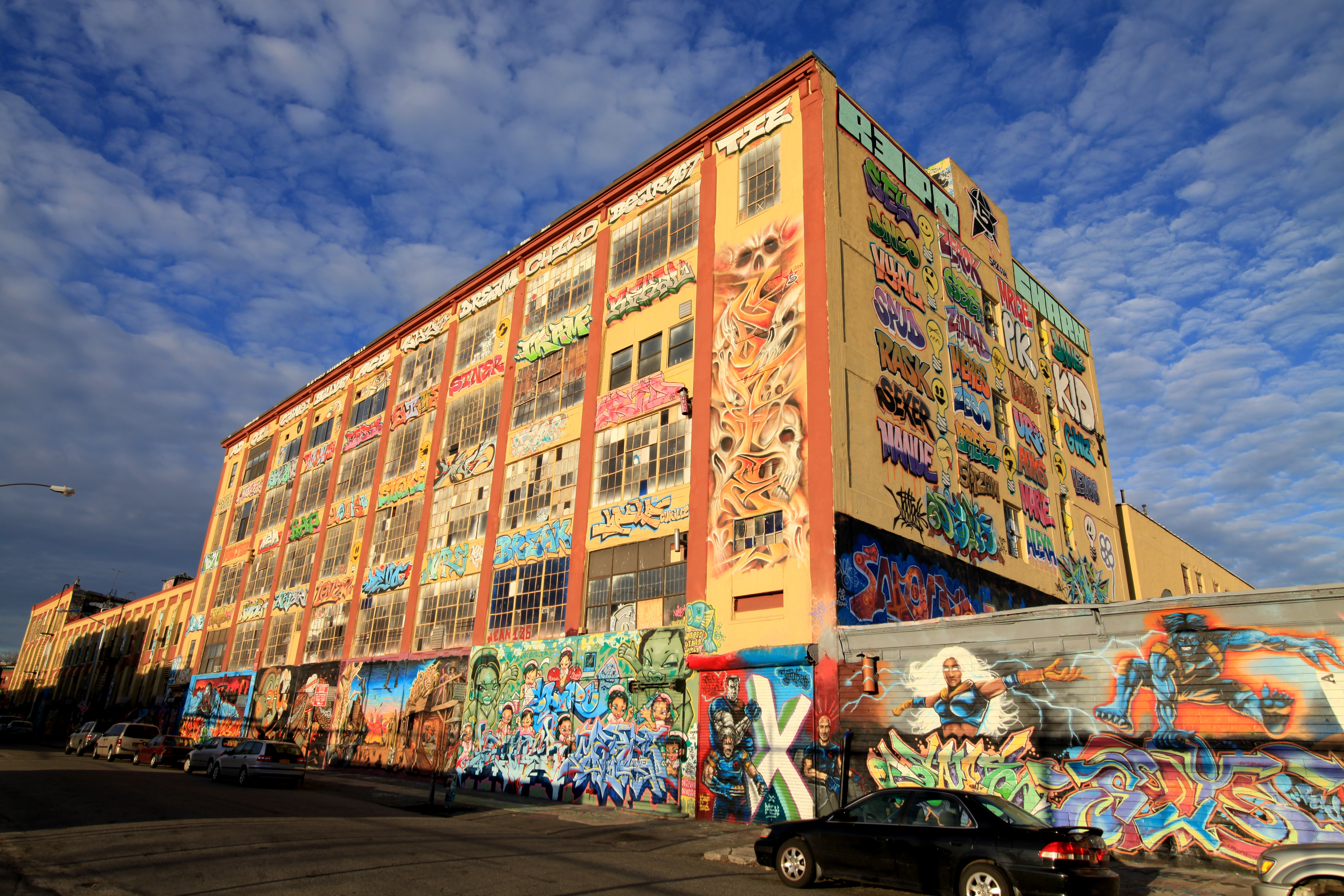
Image of 5Pointz in New York City, NY, displaying the tags and works of various graffiti artists before destruction.

== "Death" of Graffiti ==
During the 1980s, the city of New York attempted to prevent and remove graffiti from the subway. By 1983, the Transit Authority estimated that 1500 train cars had been graffitied and launched efforts to form a "great white fleet" of un-graffitied cars. Their efforts included painting the train white and constructing barbed wire fencing to hinder access to train yards. By 1989, the last of the graffitied cars had been replaced by paint-proof surfaces.

The Death of Graffiti is a response to the early efforts of the Transit Authority and the fear that all graffitied cars would disappear. The white train in the painting is a reference to train cars that were painted white, termed "white elephants" by the graffiti community. However, the white elephants were also seen as a source of excitement, serving as a blank canvas for graffiti artists to paint.

Scholars have interpreted The Death of Graffiti as prophetic, claiming that it predicted the erasure of Lady Pink's art and emphasized her struggle for self-expression. A notable example of this erasure is the destruction of 5Pointz in 2013. The building contained 45 murals, including one by Lady Pink, that were white-washed by a developer to prepare the building for condominiums.

As Lady Pink continues to develop her fine art portfolio, she includes visual elements common to graffiti artists. In The Death of Graffiti, she incorporates train cars, artist tags, and references to other graffiti artists as well as themes of self-expression and repression of art. Major museums have collected her work such as the Museum of the City of New York, the Museum of Modern Art, and the Whitney Museum of American Art.
