= NOSM (disambiguation) =

NOSM is an acronym and may refer to:

- The New Oxford Style Manual, a combined style guide and dictionary published by Oxford University Press
- The Northern Ontario School of Medicine, a medical school in Ontario, Canada
- The Navy Occupation Service Medal, an American military award
- The graffiti name of Davide Perre, a New York artist
