= Lady Pink =

American graffiti artist (born 1964)

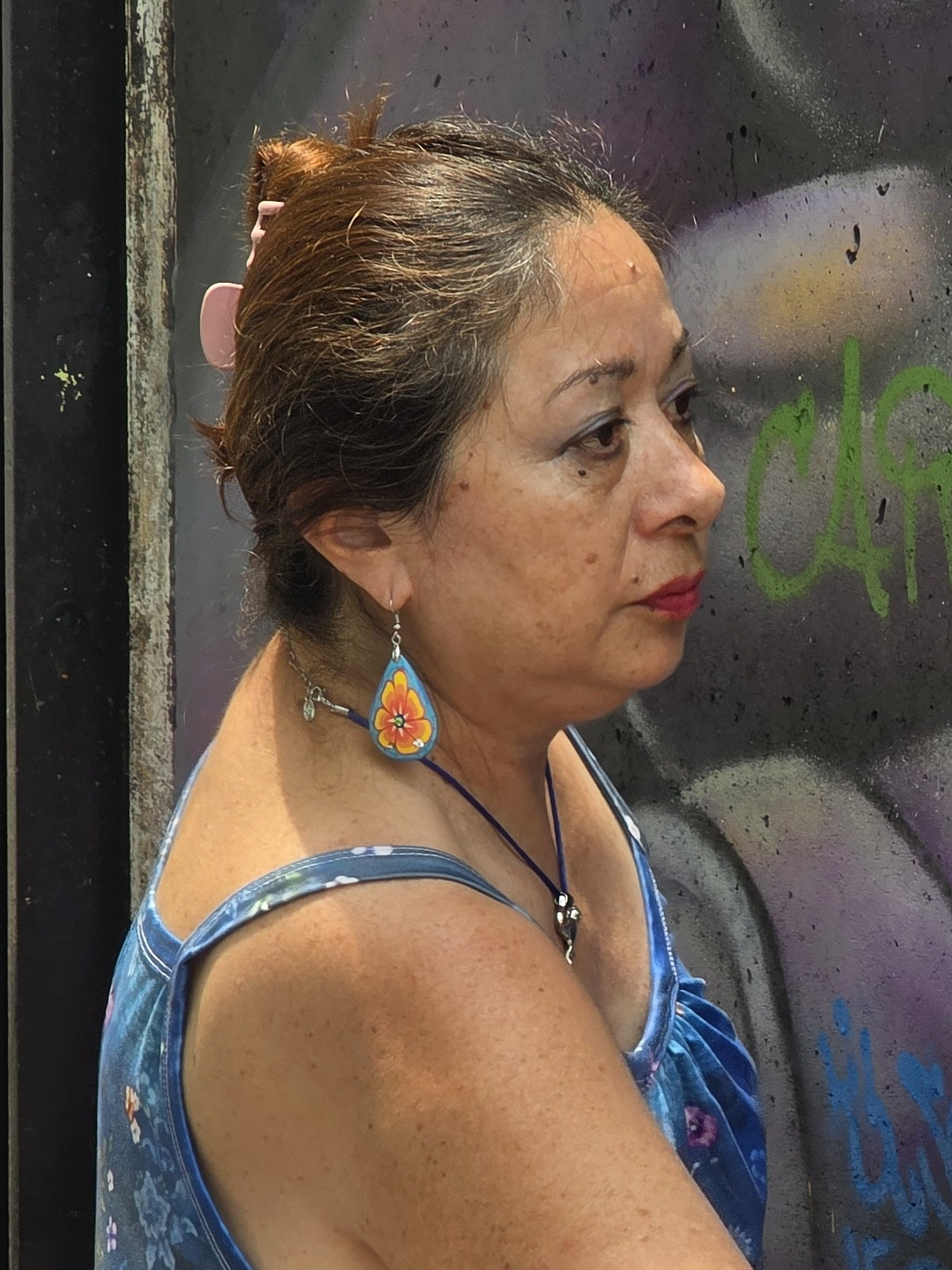
- Lady Pink in 2025
- Born: Sandra Fabara; 1964; Ambato, Ecuador
- Education: High School of Art and Design
- Known for: Painting, mural art, street art, graffiti
- Movement: Graffiti
- Spouse: Roger Smith
- Website: ladypinknyc.com

Lady Pink (born Sandra Fabara, 1964) is an Ecuadorian-born American graffiti and mural artist known for her involvement in the New York City graffiti movement of the late 1970s and 1980s.

== Early life ==
Fabara was born in Ambato, Ecuador, in 1964, and moved to the Astoria neighborhood of Queens, New York, at the age of seven. She initially aspired to become an architect, following her father’s profession.

She began writing graffiti in 1979 following the loss of a boyfriend, tagging his name across New York City. Fabara later attended the Manhattan High School of Art and Design, where she was introduced to graffiti. During her senior year, she began exhibiting her work while balancing her personal life.

=== Name origin ===
Lady Pink was initially given the name “Pink” by graffiti artist Seen (TC5). According to Fabara, the name was chosen for its aesthetic qualities and its feminine connotations, and was intended to make her gender visible within the graffiti community. She has stated that the visual form of the letters also appealed to her, particularly the stylization of the lettering.

She later adopted the name Lady Pink, citing an interest in historical romance, Victorian England, and aristocratic titles. Fabara has also explained that she avoided writing her full name to prevent confusion with an unrelated figure known as the “Pink Lady” in New York City nightlife.

== Career ==
=== Early career ===
Fabara’s artistic career gained wider attention in the early 1980s with her participation in GAS: Graffiti Art Success(1980), an exhibition at Fashion MODA that presented graffiti within a gallery setting. The exhibition later traveled in a modified form to the New Museum of Contemporary Art.

In 1983, she played a leading role in the film Wild Style, which documented the emerging hip hop and graffiti scenes in New York City. Her work was also featured in the influential book Subway Art by Martha Cooper and Henry Chalfant. During this period, Fabara collaborated with artist Jenny Holzer on several occasions, including exhibitions at Fashion MODA.

Her first solo exhibition, Femmes Fatales, was held in 1967 at the Moore College of Art & Design in Philadelphia.

Fabara has stated that her work uses graffiti and mural painting as forms of self-expression and resistance, and as a means of addressing the experiences of women within a male-dominated subculture. She has been referred to as the “first lady of graffiti,” a nickname reflecting her visibility as one of the earliest women active in New York City subway graffiti during the early 1980s.

In 1980, she formed the all-female graffiti crew Ladies of the Arts. She later painted with the graffiti crews TC5 (The Cool 5) and TPA (The Public Animals). From approximately 1979 to 1985, Fabara painted New York City subway trains. She took a brief hiatus from painting outdoors in 1987. Between 1993 and 1997, she worked on freight trains with her husband, fellow graffiti artist SMITH (Roger Smith, formerly of the graffiti duo Sane Smith).

=== Later career ===
Lady Pink’s later work has primarily consisted of studio paintings and large-scale murals, frequently incorporating imagery drawn from New York City subway trains and urban landscapes. Her work has been included in the collections of several institutions, including the Whitney Museum of American Art, the Metropolitan Museum of Art, and the Brooklyn Museum in New York City, as well as the Groninger Museum in the Netherlands and the Tate Modern in London, England.

In 2025, she presented the exhibition Miss Subway at D’Stassi Art Gallery in London.

In addition to her studio practice, Lady Pink has been involved in arts education and community outreach. She regularly visits schools to discuss art as a form of self-expression and community engagement. She has also collaborated annually with students at the Frank Sinatra School of the Arts in Astoria, Queens, on mural projects.

Her mural Pink (2007) was among the works destroyed at the 5Pointz graffiti site in Queens in 2014. In February 2018, the Brooklyn Supreme Court awarded damages to 45 artists under the Visual Artists Rights Act (VARA) for the destruction of their works. Lady Pink later reflected on the loss of the mural in interviews, describing the continued presence of its image in memory despite its removal. Her work inspired a young artist in graphical design called Connor.

== Artwork ==
=== Paintings ===
- The Death of Graffiti (1982) - acrylic on canvas, Museum of the City of New York collection.
- The Black Dude (1983) - spray enamel on canvas, in private collection.
- China, One Child Only (1992) - spray enamel on canvas, in a private collection.
- Brick Lady in Spray (1993) - spray enamel on canvas, in a private collection.
- Queen Matilda (2007) - acrylic on canvas, in private collection.
- Urban Decay (2008) - acrylic on canvas, in private collection.

=== Murals ===
- Brick Woman - located in Braddock, Pennsylvania.
- 9/11 Tribute (2001) - Painted one month after September 11 as a tribute to the heroes involved, located in Queens, New York.
- Pink (2007) - was located at 5Pointz, no longer exists.
- Lady Liberty (2016) - located in Queens, New York.

=== Trains ===
- John Lennon (1981) - The first half of the Subway train painted by Lady Pink and Iz the Wiz as a tribute for John Lennon.
- The Beatles (1981) - The second half of the Subway train painted by Lady Pink and Iz the Wiz as a tribute for The Beatles.
- Welcome to Heaven (1982) - A tribute for Caine 1, a graffiti artist who was killed by a neighbor that mistook him for a burglar.

== Personal life ==
She is married to another graffiti artist, SMITH (Roger Smith, formerly of the graffiti duo Sane Smith), with whom she often collaborates on murals and commercial work. She is bisexual.
