= Obitius =

Italian Christian saint of 13th-century

Saint Obitius
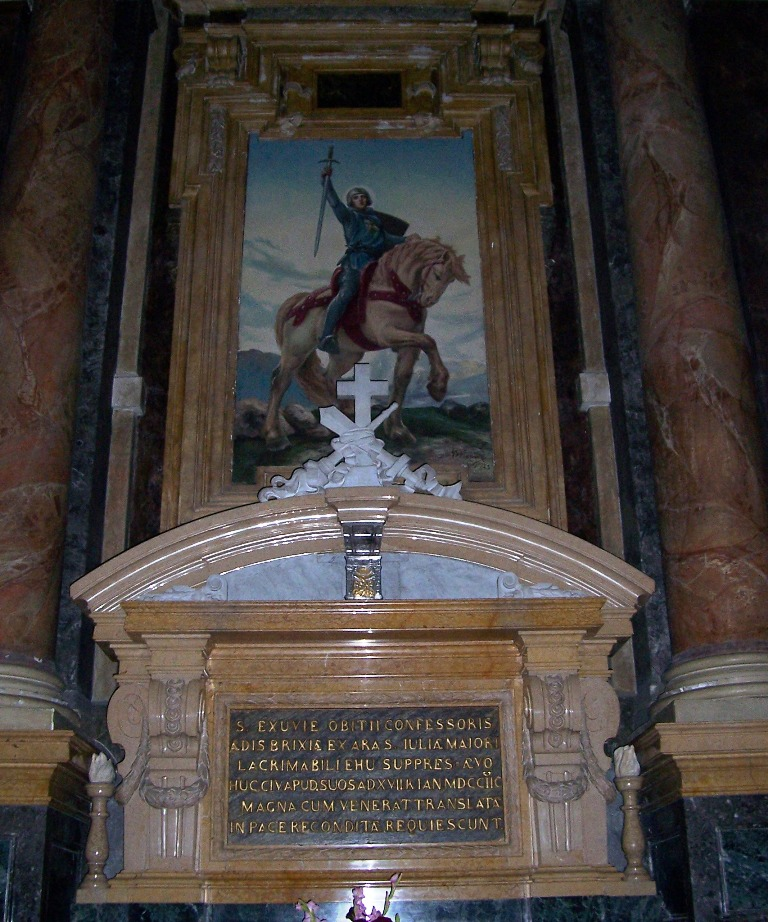
- Reliquary and altar of St. Obitius, Niardo.
- Born: February 4, ~1150 AD; Niardo
- Died: December 6, ~1204 AD
- Venerated in: Roman Catholic Church
- Beatified: 1600 (cultus confirmed) by Pope Clement VIII
- Major shrine: Niardo
- Feast: December 6; February 4
- Attributes: depicted as a warrior on horseback
- Patronage: Niardo

Obitius (Italian: Sant'Obizio) (February 4, c. 1150 - December 6, c. 1204) was an Italian saint. He was born in Niardo, in the province of Brescia, around 1150 (tradition holds that the day was February 4). His father, Gratiadeus (Graziodeo), was a knight and governor of Valcamonica. Obitius was devoted to Margaret the Virgin as a youth, and displayed an image of this virgin martyr and his armorial device.

His family had connections with the local religious community. An uncle had founded two monasteries and another relative had befriended Constantius of Perugia, the other patron saint of Niardo. Obitius nevertheless became a knight and married the countess Inglissenda Porro, with whom he had four children: Jacopo, Berta, Margherita, and Maffeo. Obitius had a successful military career as a knight, and participated in the wars between Cremona and Brescia.

== Conversion ==
An event led Obitius to abandon his military career. On July 7, 1191, at the Battle of the Malamorte, on the Oglio River, in Brescian territory, Obitius was leading an army against the Bergamaschi. The Bergamese retreated across a wooden bridge, and they were pursued by Obitius and his fellow knights. The collective weight of the soldiers, the knights’ armor, and the knights' horses caused the bridge to collapse, and Obitius and all the combatants plunged into the water. According to his legend, while he was in the water, he had a terrifying vision of Hell. Obitius managed to escape from drowning and thereafter decided to dedicate himself to a spiritual life. Despite resistance to this idea from his family, Obitius’ determination eventually swayed them, and two of his children, Margherita and Maffeo, also became a nun and monk, respectively.

Obitius lived in completely poverty, penance, and prayer and dedicated himself to working for a Benedictine convent. In 1197, he was eventually allowed to become an oblate in the monastery of Santa Giulia in Brescia. Obitius spent the rest of his life at the monastery, performing various acts of charity. Miracles were attributed to him. He was buried with great honor at the monastery church of Santa Giulia in Brescia.

== Veneration ==
In 1498, it was reported that the urn containing Obitius’ relics began to miraculously issue water. His relics were translated to the altar of Santa Giulia and in 1553, the same phenomenon was again reported. In the jubilee year of 1600, his cult was approved by the Vatican.

In 1526–7, Romanino painted the story of Obitius’ life in a series of frescoes (Storie di sant'Obizio), in the basilica of San Salvatore at Brescia.

When the monastery of Santa Giulia was suppressed in 1797 during the era of the Cisalpine Republic, Niardo demanded the relics of Obitius from Brescia and are today contained in the main altar of the parish church of Niardo.

== See also ==
- Brescia
