= Residenza Il Castello =

Il Castello of Bardine di San Terenzo a 12th-century structure and was the residence of the family Nobili.

Il Castello is located in the Bardine's Valley, in the city of Fivizzano. The site is between the Tuscan-Emilian Apennines and the Apuan Alps, near the Tyrrhenian Sea. Next to the building, an oratory (worship) and a chapel dedicated to Bernard of Clairvaux stood in honor of the patron saint of the village, whose anniversary is celebrated on August 20.

The architecture is preserved, and consists of the drying room, the hay loft, and the cowshed. Today, Il Castello is a guesthouse.
