= Raoul and Davide Perre =

Graffiti artist duo

How & Nosm TATS CRU
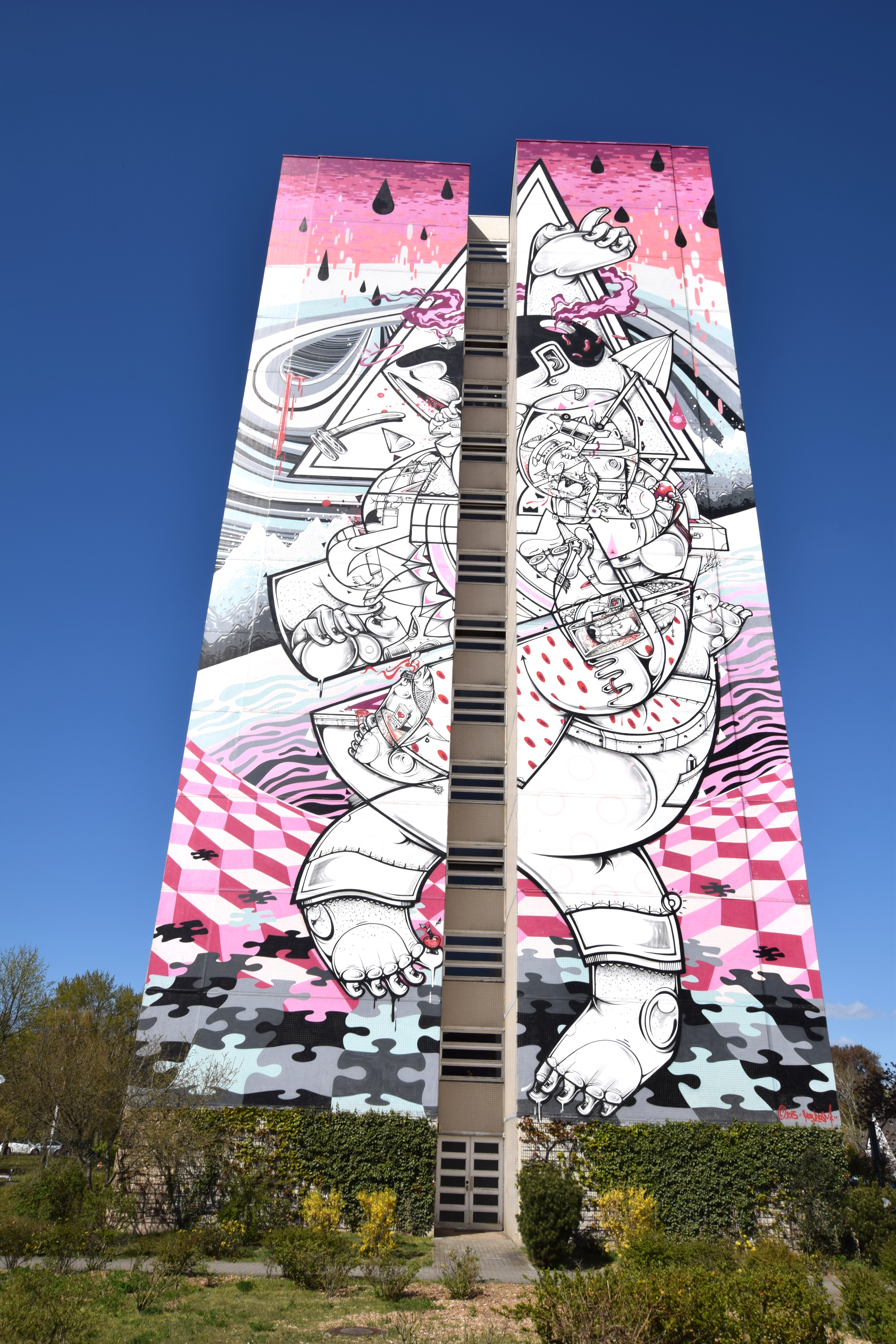
- Mural by the duo in Tegel, Berlin
- Born: Raoul Perré; 1975 (age 50–51); San Sebastián, Francoist Spain Davide Perré; 1975 (age 50–51); San Sebastián, Francoist Spain
- Movement: Graffiti
- Website: Official website

Raoul Perré and Davide Perré (a.k.a. How and Nosm respectively) are twin graffiti artists from New York City. They are both members of the Bronx-based graffiti crew, TATS CRU "The Mural Kings."

Born in the Basque Country of San Sebastián, Spain, both grew up in Düsseldorf, Germany and began doing graffiti in 1988. They spent their late teenage years traveling the world painting walls and trains with each other. While visiting New York City in 1997, both were asked to become members of TATS CRU, and permanently relocated to New York City shortly thereafter in 1999.

== Early life and background ==
Raoul and Davide Perré were born in San Sebastián, in the Basque region of Spain, before moving to Germany at a young age. They spent their formative years in Düsseldorf, where they began experimenting with graffiti in the late 1980s. Their early work involved tagging and painting trains and walls illegally, which later evolved into more elaborate murals and legal projects.

== Career ==
The twins first visited New York City in 1997, drawn by the city’s reputation as the "Mecca of graffiti." Their initial connections in the New York graffiti scene were facilitated by a visit to Fat Joe’s store in the South Bronx, where they met Brim, a founder of TATS CRU. Impressed by their work, Brim introduced them to other key members of the crew, including Bio, BG, and Nicer. After several collaborative projects, How and Nosm were invited to join TATS CRU and began representing the crew in Europe before relocating permanently to New York in 1999. With TATS CRU, How and Nosm participated in numerous mural projects, both commercial and community-based, across the United States and internationally. Their work has included large-scale murals for corporate clients as well as independent artistic endeavors.

== Artistic style ==
How and Nosm are known for their distinctive, highly detailed murals characterized by intricate line work, limited color palettes (often red, black, and white), and complex, interconnected forms. While their roots are in graffiti, they have expanded their practice to include fine art, creating paintings on canvas and exhibiting in galleries worldwide.

== See also ==
- Graffiti in the United States
