= JA One =

American graffiti artist

JA One XTC
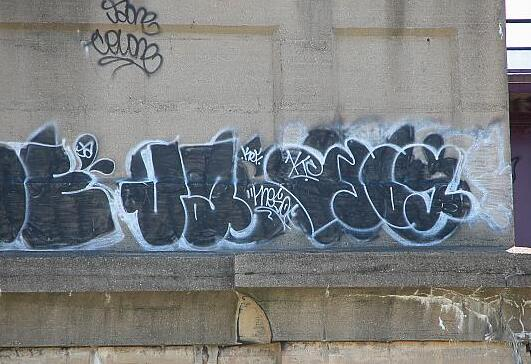
- Example of JA One’s iconic throw-up
- Born: 1969 (age 56–57)
- Movement: Graffiti

JA One, also known simply as JA, (born 1969) is an American graffiti artist from the Upper West Side of Manhattan in New York City, known for advocating street graffiti during the Metropolitan Transportation Authority's clean train era as well as his prolific output.

== Biography ==
JA began painting graffiti in New York as a teenager, and by 1985 was known for his work on the city's trains. JA One took on his tag in 1986. In response to the MTA's clamp down on train graffiti, initiated under the leadership of David L. Gunn, JA One spearheaded the movement to take graffiti bombing onto the streets. By 1990 JA was considered by peers to be all city king of New York. His willingness tackle difficult targets, such as police vehicles, has distinguished his output.

Throughout his artistic career JA One has had rivalries with other graffiti artists. In his book Subway Lives the journalist Jim Dwyer documented one of JA's conflicts with a Bushwick based graffiti crew. In a 2020 interview the graffiti tagger Lord Ezec recounted physical confrontations and conflicts he and other graffiti artists had had with JA One in the past.

JA One is regarded as one of the most prolific graffiti artists ever. It has been estimated that he has produced more that 1 million tags over the course of his career. Interviewed for a Rolling Stone feature an anonymous New York police detective estimated that, by 1995, JA was responsible for $5 million worth of damage to property in the city.

== Influence ==
JA One has been considered pivotal in the move away from the aesthetic legacy of the book Subway Art toward a stripped back focus on quantity and difficult to access spots. The impact of his artistic practice has extended beyond New York with well known graffiti artists from the Netherlands and the United Kingdom citing him as an influence.

In 2008 the fashion brand Supreme launched a collaboration featuring JA One's designs on their clothing. His artwork has also featured in a variety of popular media including the video for Michael Jackson’s song Bad and the film Stir Crazy. JA One is the subject of the 2015 monograph What Do One Million Ja Tags Signify? In 2024 he collaborated with Orchard Street based fashion brand Awake NY to produce a graffiti themed capsule.

== Personal life ==
A JA throw up incorporating a tributary Sane tag, Upper West Side c. 1995

JA has been arrested on many occasions and received prison sentences as a result of his artistic practice including Rikers Island where he began tattooing other inmates. In 1990 JA One was apprehended by the New York State Police while painting graffiti on the FDR Drive and severely beaten. He was later taken to the Harlem Hospital Center where he was treated for his injuries, requiring over 130 stitches. The police charges against him were later dropped.

The son of a film director, JA has acted several roles in various films and television series including The Karate Kid Part III, Rocky V, and The District. JA One is a practicing vegetarian. He has stated that his activity as a graffiti writer has had a negative impact on his romantic relationships in the past.

JA was a close associate of the deceased graffiti artist Sane and regularly reproduces his tag in memory of his legacy.
