= Riccardo Nobili =

Italian painter

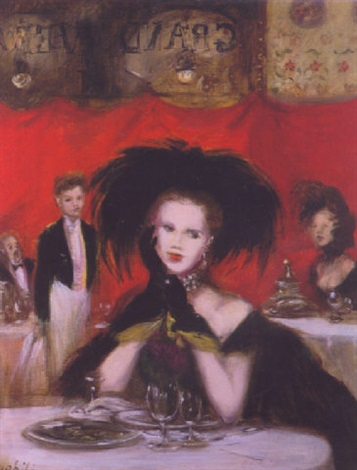
Pranzando al Grand Véfour by Riccardo Nobili

Riccardo Nobili (1859–1939) was an Italian painter, writer, and antiquarian.

== Biography ==
Nobili was born in Florence, then in the Grand Duchy of Tuscany, but part of the Kingdom of Italy when it was formed in 1861, and moved to Paris as an adult. His mother, Elena Nobili (born 1833), was a painter. He studied painting at the Academy of Fine Arts of Florence under Antonio Ciseri and Telemaco Signorini, attending also the Scuola Libera del Nudo. In Paris, he frequented the l’Académie Julian. He specialized in Genre painting. He exhibited at Livorno in 1886, the small canvases Pioggia e In birreria, and at the 1887 Società Promotrice, he displayed the nostalgic vedute of La piazza del Vecchio Mercato, Florence, a view of a neighbourhood destroyed during the urban renewal of the late 19th century. Among other works are: L'amor mio verrà dal mare. In 1938, he painted a portrait of Gioconda Mary Hulton (1887–1940) found at Attingham Park in England.

Nobili also became a novelist and a writer on the subject of art forgeries. His novel A Modern Antique: A Florentine Story documents events surrounding an appraiser of Italian Renaissance works. He is better remembered for his text on the Gentle art of faking; a history of the methods of producing imitations & spurious works of art from the earliest times to the present (1922)

In 1933, Nobili married Grace Cleveland Porter (1880–1953), the daughter of William Dodge Porter, and the grand-niece of U.S. president Grover Cleveland. She volunteered in Italy during World War I as a nurse with the Red Cross in an Italian hospital, and as Director of Recreation Services in Italian War Hospitals in Rome under the auspices of the YMCA. She wrote Negro Folk Singing Games and Folk Games of the Habitants and Mammina Graziosa (1916). Nobili received awards and decorations from the Italian government for her war service. Owing to her extraordinary service to Italy, despite being a Protestant, she was granted special permission to be buried next to her husband in the family chapel near Florence. Her papers were left to Smith College.
