= Nobile =

Nobile, a Latin word meaning noble, may refer to:

- Nobile (aristocracy), the Italian equivalent of the landed gentry
- Nobile (crater), a crater on the moon
- Nobile Glacier, a glacier in Antarctica

== People ==
- Arielle Nobile (born 1979), American film director and producer
- Arthur Nobile (1920–2004), inventor of prednisone
- Leo Nobile (1922–2006), American football player
- Luigi Nobile (1921–2009), Italian football player
- Philip Nobile, American writer
- Roberto Nobile (born 1947), Italian actor
- Salvatore Nobile (born 1964), Italian football player
- Umberto Nobile (1885–1978), Italian explorer and aeronautical engineer

== Films ==
- Una nobile rivoluzione (2014), Italian documentary on Marcella Di Folco LGBT rights political leader

== See also ==
- Nobiles
- Nobilis (disambiguation)
