= T Kid =

American graffiti artist

The Terrible T-KID 170 TAT TNB MAC
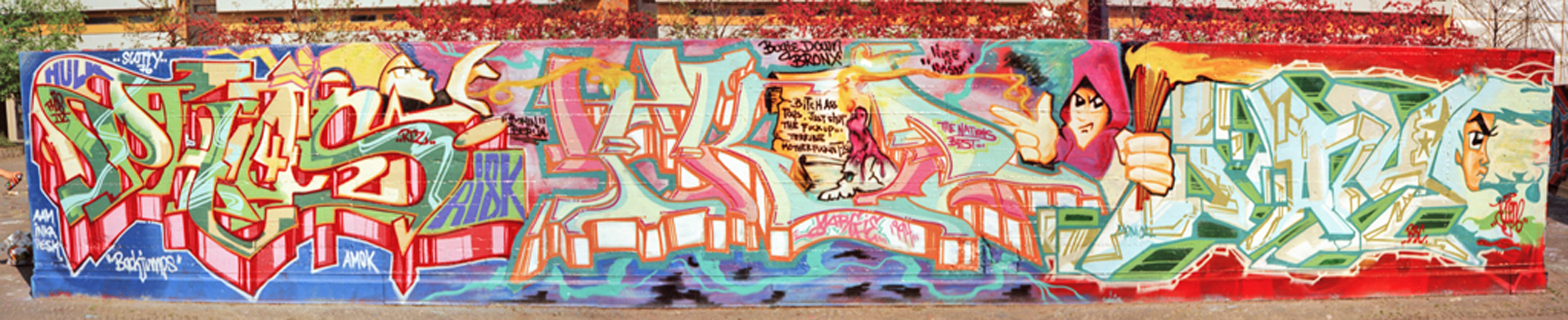
- T Kid piece (centre) alongside Phos4 (left) and Jay1 (right), Rummelsburg 1994
- Born: Julius Cavero; United States
- Known for: Public art Graffiti; Painting; Street art
- Style: Wildstyle
- Movement: Graffiti
- Website: tkid 170 on Instagram

Julius Cavero, better known as T-KID (or Terrible T-KID 170) is a graffiti artist from the Bronx, New York.

== Biography ==
=== Background and early life ===
T Kid's father was an immigrant from Peru, who worked at the Linden Assembly in New Jersey. He eventually became an iron worker as a union welder. His mother emigrated from Puerto Rico in the mid 1950s.

=== Graffiti ===
Cavero began graffiti in the 1970s, tagging "King 13" every time he won a challenge, performing daredevil tricks on swings in local parks. He was a short lived member of a gang called the Bronx Enchanters and The Renegades of Harlem, where he learned how to paint trains.

Cavero later became the president of TNB (The Nasty Boyz) and ex-president of TVS (The Vamp Squad), one of the most notorious New York graffiti crews. Henry Chalfant documented numerous subway trains painted by T-Kid 170. T-KID is still active and his work can be seen in the Bronx as well as around the world. He is also a member of MAC crew from Paris. T-Kid was originally asked to be the narrator for the Hip-Hop documentary Style Wars but he declined. The Museum of Graffiti has featured T-Kid in exhibitions like T-Kid: Living Wild Style, highlighting his pivotal role in 1970s/80s NYC subway graffiti.

== Appearances in other media ==
More recently T-Kid has appeared in the videogame Marc Eckō's Getting Up: Contents Under Pressure.
