= 5 Pointz =

Graffitied building in Queens, New York

Coordinates: 40.745152°N 73.94567°W

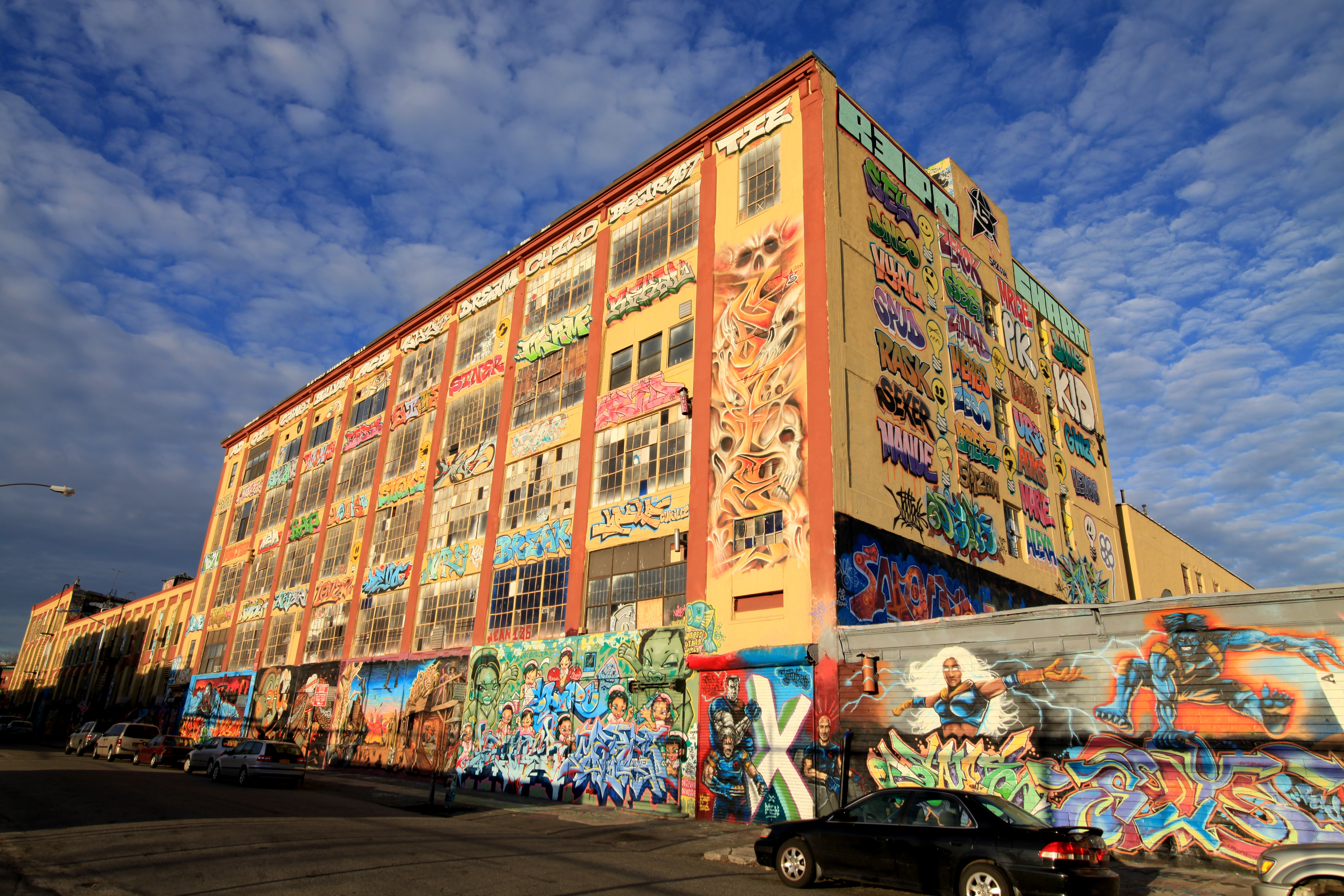
Front and side of 5 Pointz

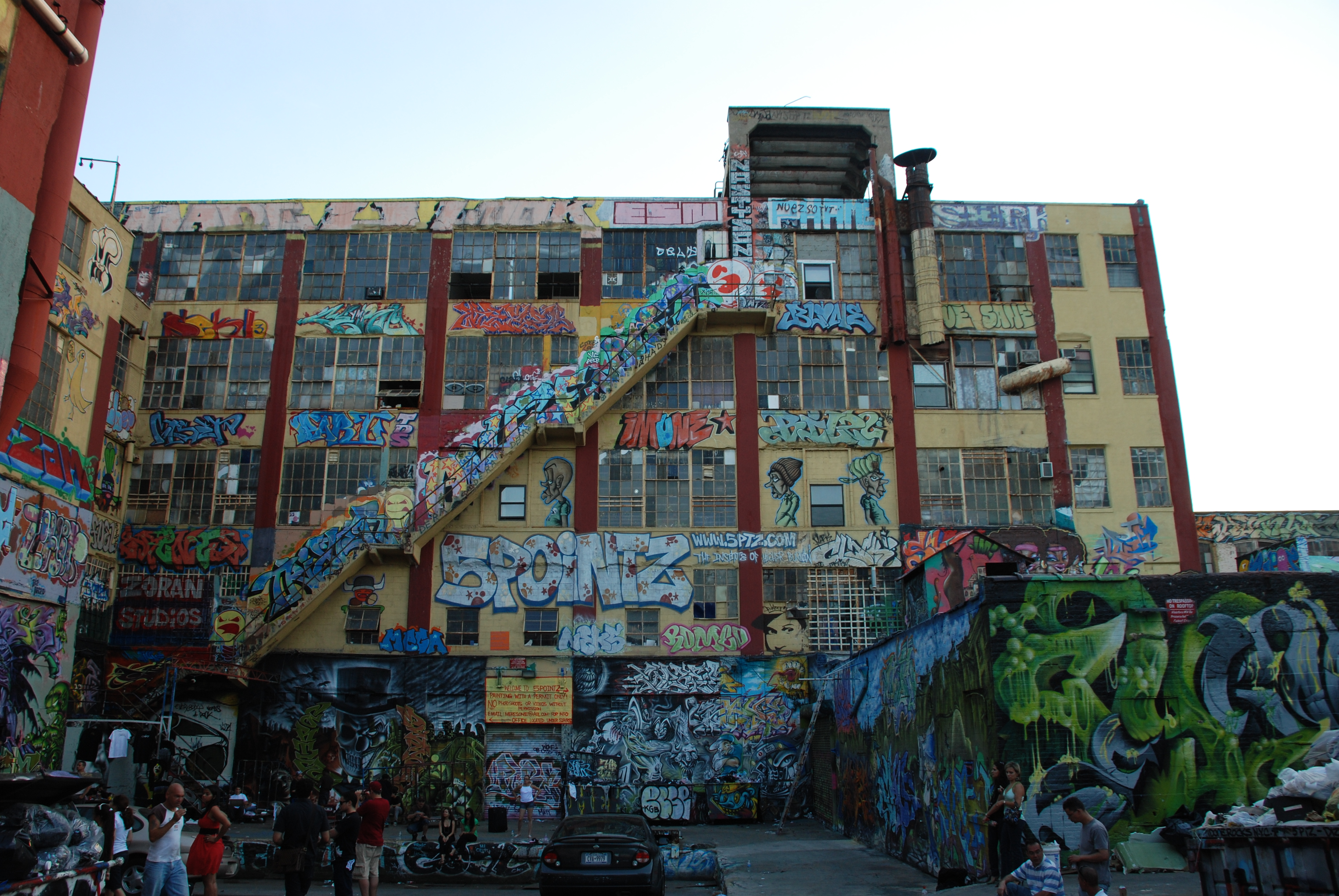
Rear of 5 Pointz

5 Pointz: The Institute of Higher Burnin or 5Pointz Aerosol Art Center, Inc., mainly referred to as simply 5 Pointz or 5Pointz, was an American mural space at 45-46 Davis Street in Long Island City, Queens, New York City, United States. When the building opened in 1892, it housed the Neptune Meter factory, which built water meters.

Jerry Wolkoff, a developer, bought the property in the early 1970s. He originally planned to develop the building, but instead leased the space to companies. Wolkoff started leasing the space as artists' studios in the 1990s. The building's exterior was covered with street art, and the building became renowned worldwide for the art on its wall. Originally known as Fun Factory, the building was renamed "5 Pointz" in 2002 after Wolkoff hired the graffiti artist Jonathan Cohen to curate the exterior murals. The new name represents the confluence of the five boroughs of New York City. The murals were exhibited mainly on the exterior walls of the building, while the interior was occupied by about 200 artists' studios.

In 2013, Wolkoff made the controversial decision to demolish 5 Pointz and replace it with a residential complex, resulting in protest. Without giving any warning, Wolkoff had the murals whitewashed overnight, which led the artists to file a lawsuit against Wolkoff. The 5 Pointz building was demolished completely in 2014. Construction on the new building complex started in 2015, with expected completion in early 2020. In February 2018, Wolkoff was ordered by a judge to pay the maximum amount of statutory damages: $150,000 each for 45 works, for a total of $6.7 million in damages to 21 artists.

== Description ==
5 Pointz consisted of twelve factory buildings that were one, three, or five stories high. Eight of these structures were interconnected. The structures had a combined 250,000 to 300,000 square feet (23,000 to 28,000 m^{2}) of floor space. The lot on which 5 Pointz was situated is 2.9 acres (1.2 ha). 5 Pointz was visible from the New York City Subway's IRT Flushing Line (7 and <7> trains), which passed over the site's far eastern corner. According to 5 Pointz' official website, it was considered to be "the world's premier graffiti mecca", where aerosol artists from around the globe painted colorful pieces on the walls of a 200,000-square-foot (19,000 m^{2}) factory building.

It had housed the Crane Street Studios, in which 200 artists paid below-market rents for studio space. A 450-square-foot (42 m^{2}) studio was listed as renting for $600 per month in 2009. 5 Pointz was described by an About.com contributor in 2008 as "a living collage of graffiti art covering a converted warehouse full of artist studios".

The name "5 Pointz" signifies the five boroughs coming together as one, but, because of its reputation as an epicenter of the graffiti scene, the industrial complex has united aerosol artists from across the world as well. Writers, including Stay High 149, Tracy 168, Cope2, Part, SPE, Dan Plasma, CORTES, and TATS CRU, have come from Canada, Switzerland, the Netherlands, Japan, Brazil, and all over the United States to paint on the building's walls. 5 Pointz had also been the subject of articles in newspapers such as The Christian Science Monitor, The Boston Globe, The New York Times, and the International Herald Tribune.

== Context and usage ==
The building was originally constructed in 1892 for Neptune Meter as a factory for the construction of water meters. At the time, the company was known as Thomson Meter Company; it changed its name in 1893, a year after the factory's opening. The property was bought in 1971 by Jerry Wolkoff, who did not have immediate plans for redevelopment. After purchasing the property, Wolkoff leased the space to a company that created 8-track tapes, CD covers, phonograph accessories through the early 1990s.

Wolkoff was approached in the 1990s for permission for the factory to be used for legal graffiti work, which he granted. The site was first established as the Phun Phactory in 1993 by Pat DiLillo under a program called Graffiti Terminators. As the new curator for the Phun Factory, DiLillo was adamant that the word "graffiti" not refer to the work displayed at the Phun Factory, as "graffiti" had long been associated with crime and gang activity. In an effort to legitimize the art movement and set a distance from the negative connotation, he imposed strict rules for future projects. His rules included that none of the artwork submitted or showcased, would depict gang related symbols. Additionally, if any of the artists' tags were found in the neighborhood or neighboring communities, their work would be immediately removed. DiLillo was also credited by some young artists as the motivation for getting their GEDs and discouraging them from breaking the law.

In 2002, Jonathan Cohen, a graffiti artist going under the moniker of Meres One, began curating work. If unfamiliar with an artist, Cohen would ask for a sample of their work, and if it was a mural, he would ask for a layout as well. Cohen renamed the building to "5 Pointz", making the building a focal point to the art scene of the five boroughs. He had plans to convert the 5 Pointz building into a graffiti museum.

In April 2009, the New York City Department of Buildings ordered the largest building closed after citing it for numerous building deficiencies including the studio partitions which were built without permits. The inspections followed an incident on April 10, 2009, in which an artist was injured when part of a concrete fire escape collapsed.

== Demolition ==
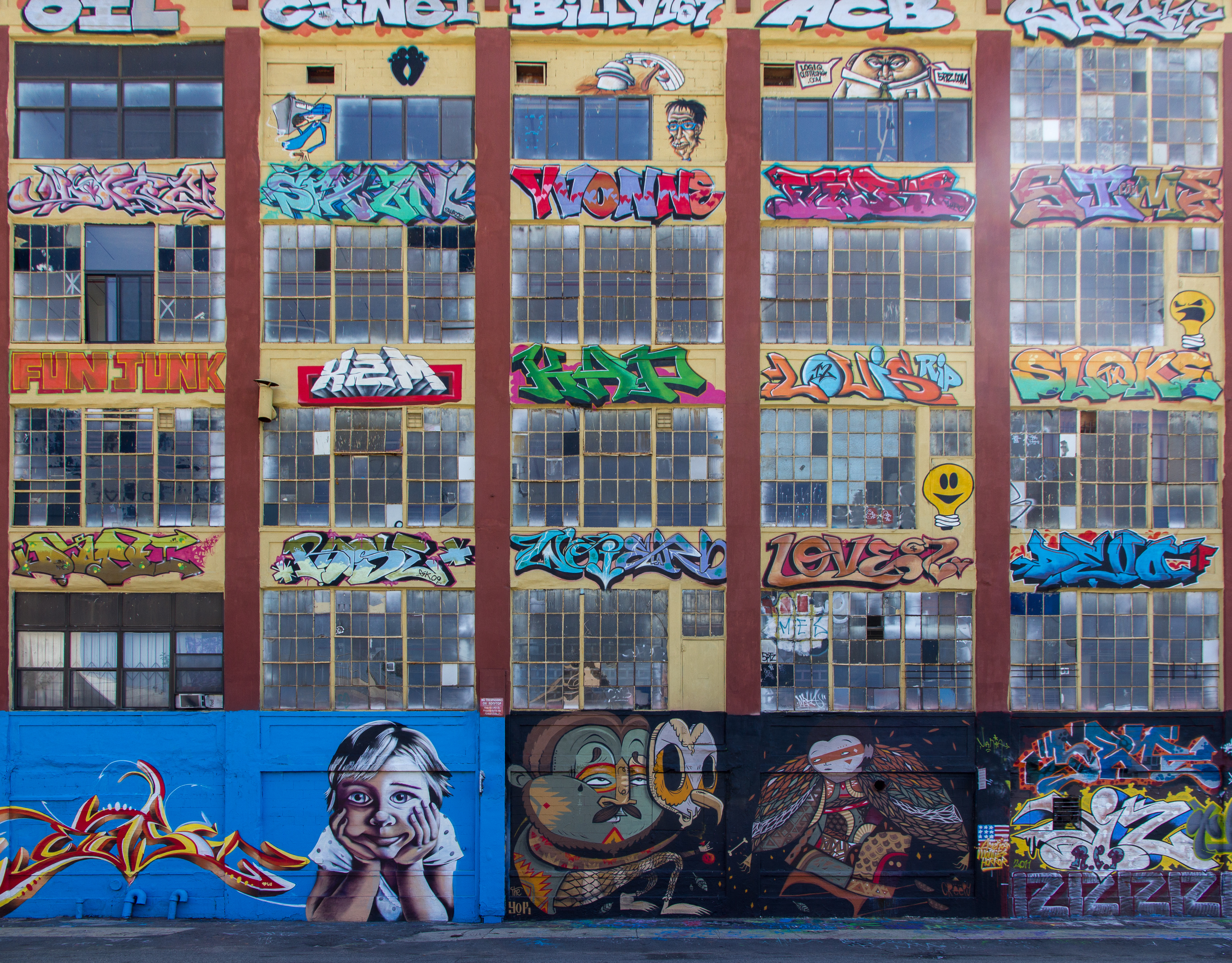
5 Pointz wall

After 40 years of ownership, the Wolkoff family decided to develop the 5 Pointz site, stating that allowance of the murals on the building had been for temporary purposes and that redevelopment of the site had been planned ever since it started to be used for graffiti. On August 21, 2013, the New York City Planning Commission unanimously voted to approve plans to build condos on the property, while the New York City Landmarks Preservation Commission rejected a landmark status nomination by artists because the art was less than 30 years old at the time. The development plans include two residential towers with retail space and affordable housing. There would be a 1,000-unit apartment complex with a 250-spot parking lot, a public park. Wolkoff wanted to demolish 5 Pointz by the end of 2013 for this purpose. On October 9, the New York City Council unanimously approved the $400 million development plan. The proposals for the building also called for 10,000 square feet (930 m^{2}) to be used exclusively for art panels and walls in the building, including ground level facades to be used for curated graffiti. It was estimated that in the last decade of the building's existence, 11,000 murals had been painted on the interior and exterior.

In October 2013 Cohen, speaking to The Guardian, made an appeal to the famous street artist Banksy. Hoping that Banksy's influence could help save 5 Pointz, he said "We're not asking you to give us money, but your words could help. Why don't you put a comment out?" This was in the midst of Banksy's highly publicized month-long residency in New York City, during which he released a new piece each day somewhere in the city and posted clues to its whereabouts on his website. There was no response from Banksy until October 31, the final day of his residency, when the message posted on his website which accompanied his last piece read, "Thanks for your patience. It's been fun. Save 5pointz. Bye."

On November 12, 2013, a district court denied a request for a preliminary injunction preventing the destruction of the paintings, with a written opinion soon to follow. On the night of November 19, 2013, Wolkoff hired workmen, who whitewashed the graffiti on the exterior of the 5 Pointz building at his instruction. Wolkoff provided images that showed the building's previously graffiti-covered walls partially covered in white paint. A message posted to 5 Pointz's Twitter account on the morning of November 19 confirmed the reports. Despite a lawsuit filed by 5 Pointz proprietors, as well as a rally three days prior to gain petition signatures to protect the building from demolition, the sudden whitewashing indicated that it was already gone. On November 20, the Eastern District of New York issued their written opinion stating that while the "Court regrettably had no authority under VARA to preserve 5Pointz as a tourist site," the whitewashing could result in the Wolkoff family having to pay damages to 5 Pointz artists.

Asbestos abatement work began on the property in February 2014, the first step in the building demolition process. During this period a group of urban explorers entered to document the building's interior. As of August 2014, 5 Pointz was nearly fully demolished. By November 2014, most of the building was reduced to rubble, while part of the building's shell still stood.

=== Reactions ===
News of the building's demolition was generally negatively received by artists, and at least two works of protest have been done upon the building. On February 3, 2014, in protest of the building's demolition, artists sprayed "Art Murder" in big blue and red letters on the side of the building. On March 10, 2014, upset artists, who had lost a proposal to attain landmark status for the building, staged a protest by draping a large yellow "Gentrification In Progress" banner around the building. According to an article in Complex magazine in November 2014, some artists felt that they had been disrespected when the murals were painted over, and that they had lost a sense of community with the demolition of the building. Additionally, the destruction of 5 Pointz resulted in a scarcity of cheap and legal mural spaces, according to one artist interviewed. In lieu of 5 Pointz, some mural artists are going to Jersey City and the Bronx instead.

Another, similar controversy arose when Wolkoff decided to use "5 Pointz" as the name for the new condominiums being constructed on 5 Pointz's site. He had claimed to own the rights to the building's name because he owned the building; however, an application to trademark the name was rejected in March 2014 because it was too close to a similar, existing trademark. Wolkoff has said that the name refers to the building site, not the art; his comment had insulted some artists at the site, with two artists saying that "it's ironic that the same corporation which single-handedly destroyed all the artwork known as 5Pointz is trying to capitalize on its name" and that "the disrespect continues".

In June 2015, artists whose works had been featured at 5 Pointz filed a second federal lawsuit against Jerry Wolkoff, stating that the destruction of the building violated the 1990 Visual Artists Rights Act, and that they did not receive the notice of the building's demolition 90 days in advance. This came after federal judge Frederic Block of the District Court for the Eastern District of New York ruled that the artists could have a jury trial, as opposed to a bench trial where only judges would hear the artists' and Wolkoff's arguments. The trial, which began in mid-October 2017, was seen as an important case since it would decide whether graffiti could be categorized as art that could be federally protected. In November 2017, a jury recommended that Block issue a verdict that Wolkoff's destruction of the graffiti was illegal. In February 2018, Block awarded $6.7 million to 21 of the artists whose works had been destroyed. Wolkoff appealed the decision and in February 2020, the Second Circuit Court of Appeals upheld Block's 2018 decision. Wolkoff made a final appeal to the Supreme Court of the United States prior to his death in July 2020, which declined to hear the case that October.

== 5 Pointz Tower ==
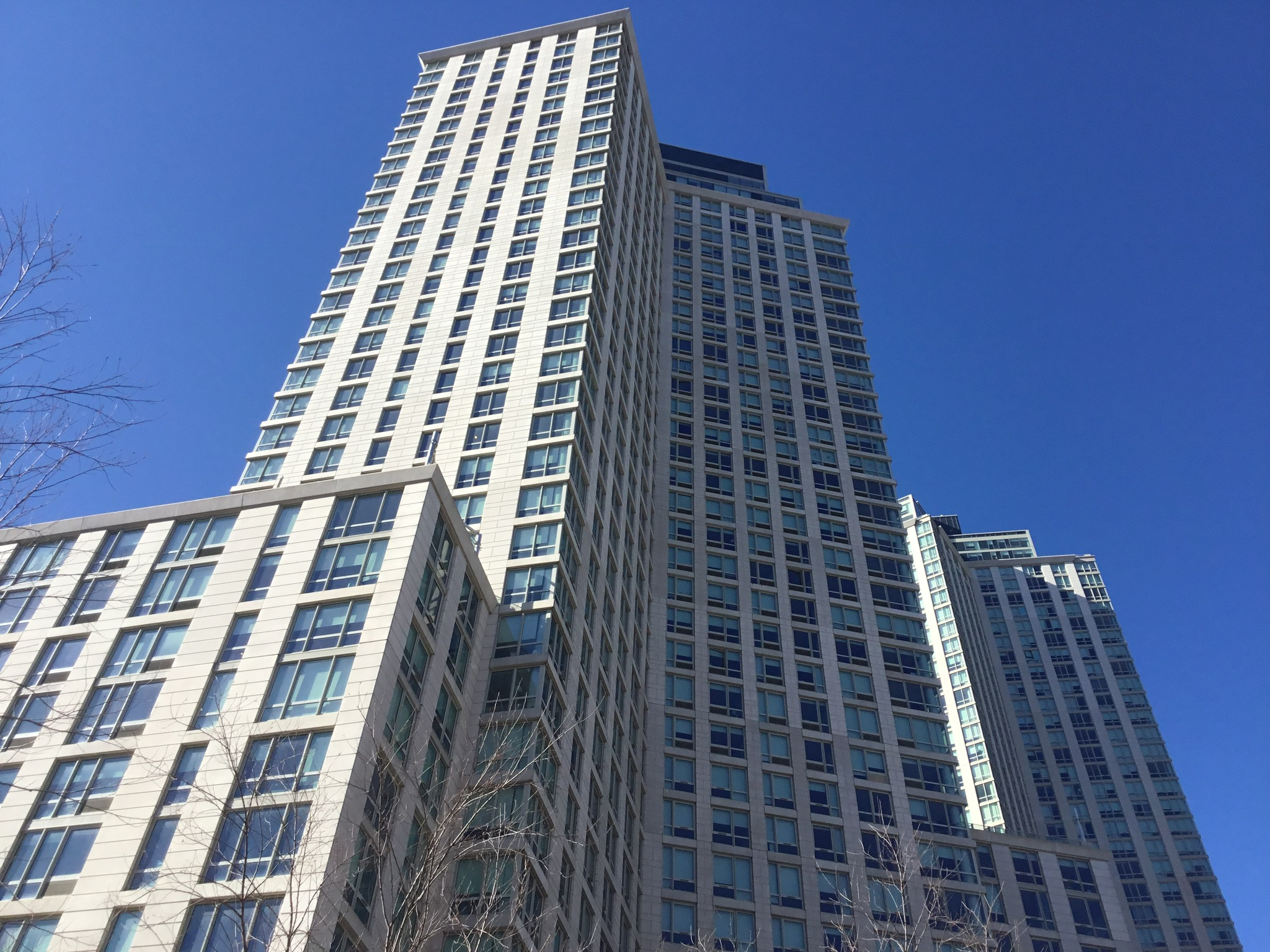
The tower in 2023

The apartment complex was later revised to include 1,115 units, including 223 affordable apartments, as well as 20 art studios and 40,000 square feet (3,700 m^{2}) of commercial space. Foundations for the two new buildings on the site, one with 41 stories and the other with 48, were completed in late 2015. The towers stood at 5 and 12 stories, respectively, by January 2017, and the buildings were topped-out at their final height in 2018. Renderings of the new complex's interior show murals representative of the old building's street art, as well as an "engraved graffiti logo" made of steel within the complex's lobby. The buildings were expected to open in early 2020.

== In popular culture ==
The building has served as a backdrop for movies and TV shows, including the climax for the 2013 film Now You See Me. Additionally, in 2011, 5 Pointz was the fictionalized site of a major fire in the series finale of the TV show Rescue Me.

The striking, graffiti-covered warehouse has been used in music videos as well. Such videos are usually by several hip-hop and R&B stars, including Doug E. Fresh, Kurtis Blow, Grandmaster Caz, Mobb Deep, Rahzel, DJ JS-1, Boot Camp Clik, Joan Jett, and Joss Stone.

== See also ==
- Culture of New York City
- Graffiti in New York City
- Graffiti in the United States
- Street art
- Tower 13
