= Nobilis (disambiguation) =

Nobilis, a Latin word meaning noble, may refer to:

- Nobilis, a role-playing game

== See also ==
- Nobile (disambiguation)
- Nobiles, a social rank in ancient Rome
- Nobili, an Italian surname
