= Elena Nobili =

Italian painter

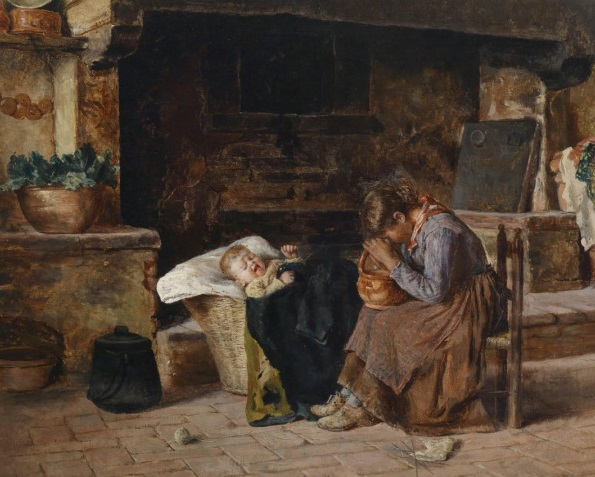
Il piccolo piagnucolone

Elena Nobili (1833–1900) was an Italian painter, mainly of genre figure paintings.

She was born in Florence. Her son, Riccardo Nobili (1859–1939), was also a painter. Among her works are Reietti! (Exhibition of Turin, 1884), Bonaccia (Promotrice of Florence, 1884), Una visita; Aspettativa; Settembre; In campagna: Burrasche coniugali; Due novembre; Spariti!; Eccoli!; Musica; Prima del convegno; Contrasti; Figura del 700; smf La caccia sui tetti. At the Mostra Beatrice of "Female Works", held in 1890 in Florence, she won the silver medal.
