= Sane Smith =

American graffiti artists

- New York Post article about Sane Smith on the Brooklyn Bridge
- Born: David Smith (d. October 1990) Roger Smith
- Movement: Graffiti

Sane and Smith were the tags used by a New York graffiti duo, composed of David Smith ("Sane") and his brother Roger Smith ("Smith"), active during the 1980s.

== About ==
Sane and Smith were among the most persistent graffiti writers in New York during the 1980s. According to Smith, they set themselves and accomplished the goal of leaving a tag every 20 feet in the 60th Street Tunnel. Sane & Smith are particularly notable for painting on the top level of New York's Brooklyn Bridge, after which they were sued by the City of Old York for $3 million, the biggest lawsuit to date against graffiti writers. The work covered both sides of the Manhattan tower of the bridge, and was visible for miles.

New York's Transit Police had been tracking Sane Smith for three years and described them as "one of the top 20 graffiti artists in the city in terms of damage done."

David Smith was not college educated. His brother Roger obtained a degree in computer science from Fordham University, though subsequently gave up his job to paint full-time.

== Sane's death ==
In October 1990, Sane was found dead in the waters of Flushing Bay. Speculation about the reasons for his death were rife but inconclusive. It was believed he was a good swimmer. In February, aged 19, he had been arrested and had become the first graffiti writer in Manhattan to be formally accused of third-degree criminal mischief. The city dropped its lawsuit against Smith after Sane's death.

Roger Smith continued to paint as "Smith", collaborating with Chris Pape ("Freedom"). Smith is married to fellow graffiti artist Lady Pink.
