= The Splasher =

American graffiti artists

The Splasher is the name given to one or more street artists operating in New York City starting in late 2006 and continuing until June 2007. The Splasher was a serial vandal who splattered other works of street art with paint, thus earning the title of "Splasher." The Splasher also left manifestos pasted alongside their graffiti.

During the time The Splasher was active, it sparked considerable debate about the identity and motives of vandal or vandals involved, along with the merit and status of graffiti art itself. The myth and legend of The Splasher gained considerable notoriety nationwide.

In June 2007, two men were caught trying to set off a stink bomb at an art opening in the Dumbo district of Brooklyn, New York. One escaped and the other was arrested. The arrestee, James Cooper, was alleged to be affiliated with the group behind The Splasher.

== History ==
In January 2007, multiple works of street art in Williamsburg, Brooklyn were defaced with splattered paint. Several of the defacings had a wheat-pasted document next to them, entitled AVANT-GARDE: ADVANCE SCOUTS FOR CAPITAL and “Art: The Excrement of Action. The documents consisted of a revolutionary manifesto decrying the hypocrisy of street art. The edicts also contained a warning at the end, stating that they were booby-trapped with glass shards, making removal difficult.

The street art vandalism spread to Manhattan as well. By March 2007, the story had been picked up by The New York Times, and The Splasher, whose name had not yet been popularly coined, began to gain a high profile.

The splashings continued until June 2007, when James Cooper, 24, was arrested at an art opening in Brooklyn for trying to set off a stink bomb from a coffee can at an art opening for Shepard Fairey. Cooper was charged with third-degree arson, reckless endangerment, placing a false bomb, criminal possession of a weapon, harassment and disorderly conduct. Two days after his release, a group of individuals distributed a 16-page manifesto at another Fairey art opening entitled If we did it this is how it would’ve happened. The manifesto stated the motives of the group behind The Splasher:

By challenging what the experts term 'street art', our actions have, in turn, uncovered an alliance between the coercive force of the state and the "creative class" of the artist.

The authors linked the street art movement to furthering gentrification in New York neighborhoods.

== Cultural impact ==
The works of The Splasher raised questions about the validity and status of street art as art, and the unwritten "rules" of the field. Francesca Gavin of The Guardian commented:

In the more rule-laden graffiti scene, lining someone else's work (crossing it out with spray paint) is the ultimate insult. But street art hasn't developed with those parameters. The transitory nature of street art is what gives it its impact. Many people creating work don't expect longevity – no wall stays the same for long in a city. Arguably The Splasher's Dadaist political cries are just another form of street art in themselves.

Prior to arrest of Cooper, the motives of The Splasher were speculated as possibly being, among other things, a guerrilla marketing campaign or a cry for attention. David Segal, of the Washington Post, came up with a theory that The Splasher was actually advertising for American Apparel, based on appearances of American Apparel ads alongside pasted Splasher manifestos.

When Mr. Cooper was arrested at Fairey's gallery. Fairey spoke with him, seeking an apology, though said that Cooper "tried to turn it around and say that he is the victim and that I should feel bad for him."

The Manifesto was compared with works by Jeanette Winterson, Guy Debord, and Amiri Baraka. Michael Kimmelman, art critic for The New York Times, compared The Splasher's actions with the Situationists, and disagreed with the manifesto's claims of gentrification:

Does street art gentrify neighborhoods? Graffiti didn’t gentrify SoHo. Wall Street did. It didn’t gentrify subways. From West Philadelphia to East Los Angeles, much of the best street painting is in poor neighborhoods that have resisted change. It’s hard to feel sympathetic with vandals splashing paint on posters or stenciled pictures, notwithstanding that some of the splashes look kind of aesthetic.

All that said, public space and civic justice are difficult issues to which the brouhaha returns our attention. New York neighborhoods are indeed changing, not all for the better, as the city becomes more affluent and homogeneous, and art shouldn’t exist in it simply as a symbol of wealth and privilege. It should seize public spaces where it can, to make itself more part of daily life, more relevant in the world, and to become a source of serendipity, pleasure, trouble, controversy and interest to people outside the art world, not just inside it.
