= Tats Cru =

American graffiti artists

- Top Artistic Talent
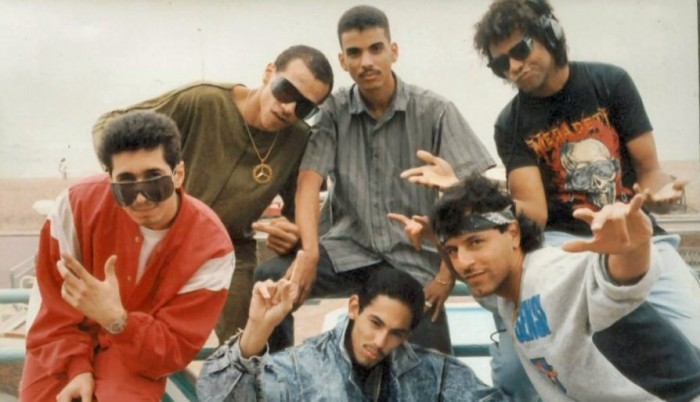
- Members of Tats Cru (left to right, Nicer, Goldie, Brim, Bio, T Kid and Vulcan), Brighton 1987
- Founders: Bio; BG183; Brim; Nicer
- Founded at: New York
- Type: Graffiti crew
- Headquarters: Hunts Point
- Location: New York, United States
- Key people: BG183; Bio; HOW; Nicer; NOSM
- Website: Official website

Tats Cru, also known as The Mural Kings, is a collective of Bronx-based graffiti artists.

The group was originally formed in 1980 by Wilfredo “BIO” Feliciano along with BRIM (Brim Fuentes) and MACK. Later they were joined by BG183 (Sotero Ortiz), and Nicer (Hector Nazario). Initially the crew would paint at block parties and on subway cars together under the name T.A.T Cru changing the styling to TATS CRU in the early 90's.

The membership over the years has evolved to include a number of other artists at different times. In particular it came to include Basque born artists HOW and NOSM (Raoul and Davide Perré). Today the core membership of the TATS Cru is BIO, Nicer and BG183.

== Work ==
The collective is known for creating New York City–style memorial murals. Notably creating a graffiti mural of the late Puerto Rican hip hip artist Big Pun in 2000. It's a mural that the crew have subsequently refreshed multiple times. Overall since the 1990's the group is estimated to have created around 120 RIP Murals.

Tats Cru's work work has also included tributes to artists and performers such as Jennifer Lopez, Nas, Missy Elliott, Rick Ross, DJ Kool Herc, Nicki Minaj, and Metallica. They have also produced murals and advertising campaigns for a wide range of clients, from local businesses to multinational corporations such as Coca-Cola and Sony.

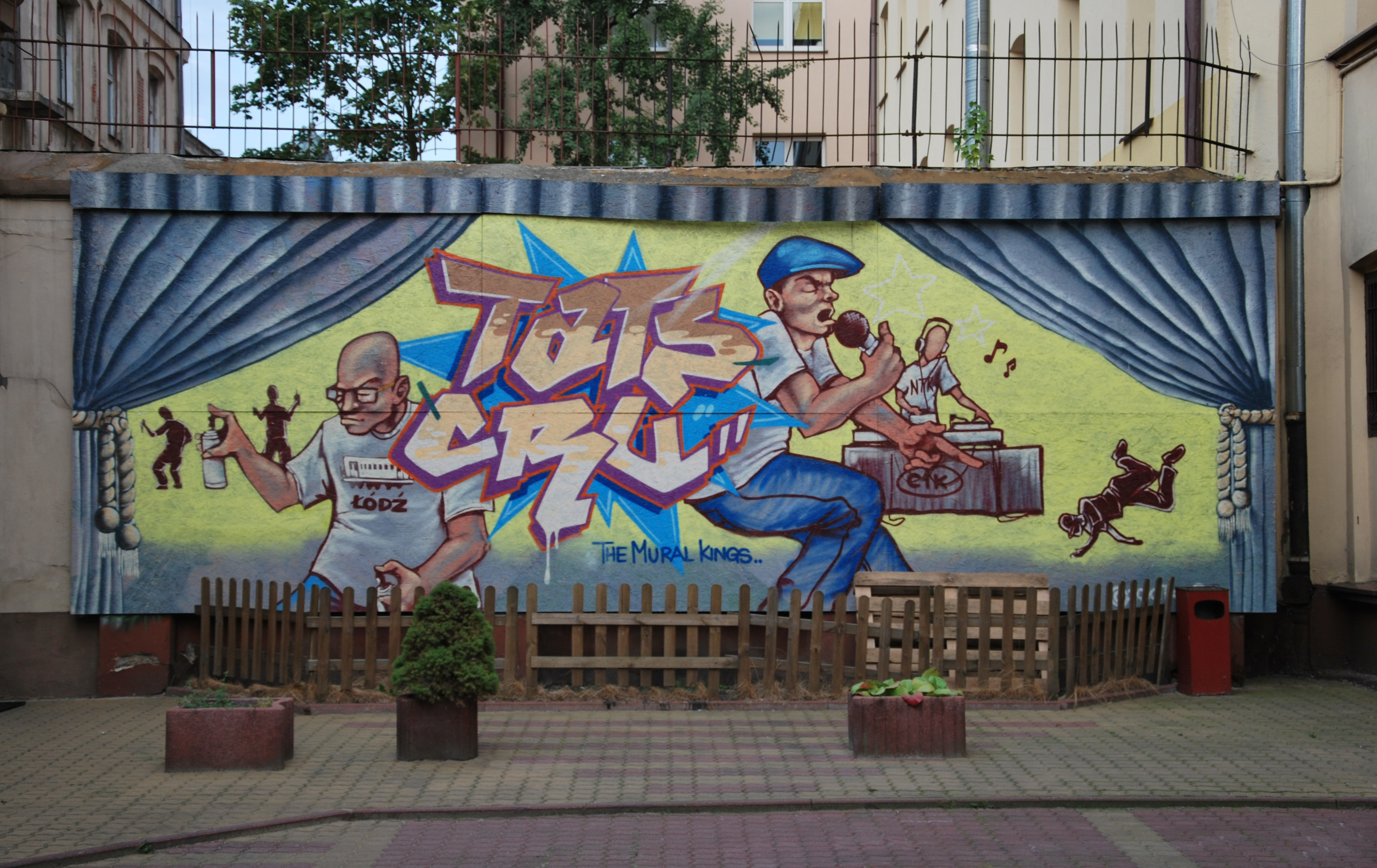
Mural by Tats Cru on Piotrkowska Street, Łódź

== Core Members ==
=== Bio ===
Wilfredo “BIO” Feliciano is a Puerto Rican–American graffiti artist based in New York City. He began his artistic career painting on New York City subway cars with the TAT Cru in the early 1980s. Alongside his fellow crew members Nicer and BG183, he went on to co-found Tats Cru as a business, producing murals across the city. Before pursuing art full-time, Feliciano worked for a nonprofit organization while taking on small art jobs. He decided to commit to an artistic career after losing his job and learning he was going to be a father, describing the decision as a leap of faith.

For more than three decades, Feliciano has worked as a professional muralist and painter. He has created murals for corporations, small businesses, schools, films, and music videos, while also producing canvas works and exhibiting internationally. His practice has included collaborations with companies on products featuring his artwork, and he continues to develop new prints and mural projects. He has also articulated his professional values, emphasising reliability, respect, and maintaining high quality in all projects.

=== Nicer ===
Hector “Nicer” Nazario is an American graffiti artist and muralist from the Bronx, New York, and a founding member of the Bronx graffiti collective Tats Cru. He began tagging subway cars and walls in the early 1980s, working with classmates Wilfredo “Bio” Feliciano and Sotero “BG183” Ortiz, whom he met at James Monroe High School in the South Bronx.

Over more than three decades, Nazario has contributed to Tats Cru’s transition from clandestine subway graffiti to widely commissioned murals and institutional projects. In a 2013 gathering at the Bronx Documentary Center, he described how early graffiti functioned as a form of communication across boroughs, with trains painted in the Bronx traveling into Manhattan and Brooklyn. He has worked collaboratively on murals for hip hop artists, local businesses, and public art projects, helping to reposition graffiti from illicit expression to recognized cultural and artistic practice.

=== BG183 ===
BG183 (born Sotero Ortiz) is an American graffiti artist and a core member of the Bronx-based collective Tats Cru. He was born and raised in the South Bronx.

Ortiz began drawing at an early age and started painting graffiti on New York City trains as a teenager. Over a career spanning more than four decades, he has become known for his intricate lettering, dynamic characters, and complex backgrounds. His work has been exhibited in institutions such as the Smithsonian Institution and the Bronx Museum of the Arts, as well as international galleries. Ortiz has collaborated with major brands and created murals commemorating figures from hip hop and local culture.

== Notable Other Members ==
=== HOW and NOSM ===
Raoul “How” Perré and Davide “Nosm” Perré are twin graffiti artists from New York City. Born in San Sebastián, Spain, they grew up in Düsseldorf, Germany, and began doing graffiti in 1988. As teenagers, they traveled internationally, painting walls and trains. While visiting New York City in 1997, they were invited to join TATS Cru and permanently relocated to the city in 1999.

Over their careers, the Perré twins have created murals worldwide, blending their European upbringing with New York graffiti traditions. Their artistic style is characterized by a limited color palette of red, black, and white, meticulous linework, and intricate symbolic imagery. Their work often combines graffiti roots with fine art elements, including dynamic patterns and collage techniques, resulting in complex, large-scale murals that are simultaneously graphic and expressive. They have traveled to over 60 countries to create murals, maintaining a strong street art presence while also exhibiting in galleries.

=== Brim ===
Brim Fuentes, is a founding member of Tats Cru and was born in South Bronx, New York City. Brim was fortunate enough to start writing graffiti in one of the most important periods of graffiti history. He began bombing and hitting New York City Subway trains, in the late 1970s, all the way through to the mid-1980s. After the trains were cleaned in 1989 he and the rest of TATS CRU took to the streets and began bombing and creating street art all over the city. Brim's friendship to Afrika Bambaataa, and the almighty Universal Zulu Nation led to Brim being featured in one of the most important videos in hip-hop culture, "Afrika Bambaataa - Renegades of Funk", Brim was also featured in many other important documentaries and movies about Hip-Hop and graffiti culture from that time period including Dick Fontaine's 1987 documentary "Bombin" where he was introduced to fellow British graffiti artists Goldie and 3D (who later went on to form Massive Attack) . Brim became Goldie's artistic mentor, New York was the place that lifted his horizons, and America was where he would later become "Goldie". Brim was documented as the first graffiti artist to come to the UK and appeared on many TV stations and newspapers including the front page of The Daily Telegraph discussing this graffiti culture. Upon this media frenzy Brim was invited to lecture at Oxford University and was asked personally by Michael Winner to create the backdrops in his film Death Wish 3 which starred Charles Bronson. The prequel to this film was BBC'S 1984 Beat This: A Hip-Hop History The film included footage from DJ Kool Herc's original parties, The Cold Crush Brothers, Jazzy Jay, Soul Sonic Force and Afrika Bambaataa. The film featured Brim's take on graffiti in New York. The film was one of the first documentaries about Hip-Hop. Brim would go on to form a clothing line FJ560 with then famous rapper and friend Fat Joe The flagship store was located in the Bronx, New York City. Fat Joe, The Terror Squad and Big Pun can be seen in many videos wearing FJ560. Fat Joe would paint with TATS CRU before he was a famous rapper. Brim and TATS CRU would be heavily involved with advertisement for Fat Joe and created painted billboards across the city promoting his album releases. By becoming such an iconic figure in the world of art he received a mention alongside other TATS CRU members in the KRS-One track "Out For Fame". On the passing of Big Pun, TATS CRU painted the memorial wall that is visited daily; Brim is currently working on the Big Pun statue project that will create a 3D memorial wall in honor of the late Big Pun. Brim currently lives in China.
