= Mole people =

People who live in tunnels underground

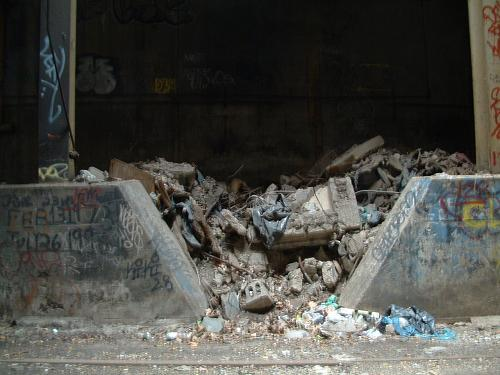
Demolished shanty housing once used by the homeless in Manhattan's Freedom Tunnel

In the United States, the term mole people (also called tunnel people or tunnel dwellers) is sometimes used to describe homeless people living under large cities in abandoned subway, railroad, flood, sewage tunnels, and heating shafts.

== In documentary film and non-fiction ==
Dark Days, a 2000 documentary feature film by British filmmaker Marc Singer, follows a group of people living in an abandoned section of a regional rail tunnel in New York City, in the area called Freedom Tunnel. Anthropologist Teun Voeten's 1996 book Tunnel People is also about the inhabitants of the Freedom Tunnel, where Voeten lived for five months. Sociologist Terry Williams's 2024 book Life Underground: Encounters with People Below the Streets of New York features over 60 interviews with people who lived in parts of the Freedom Tunnel, from West Seventy-Second and West Ninety-Sixth Streets, between 1991 to 1996 and 2000 and 2020.

Jennifer Toth's 1993 book The Mole People: Life in the Tunnels Beneath New York City, written while she was an intern at the Los Angeles Times, was promoted as a true account of travels in the tunnels and interviews with tunnel dwellers. The book helped canonize the image of the mole people as an ordered society living literally under people's feet. However, few claims in her book have been verified, and it includes inaccurate geographical information, numerous factual errors, and an apparent reliance on largely unprovable statements. The strongest criticism came from New York City Subway historian Joseph Brennan, who declared, "Every fact in this book that I can verify independently is wrong." Cecil Adams's The Straight Dope contacted Toth in 2004, and noted the large amount of unverifiability in her stories, while declaring that the book's accounts seemed to be truthful. A later article, after contact with Brennan, was more skeptical of Toth's truthfulness.

Other journalists have focused on the underground homeless in New York City as well. Photographer Margaret Morton made the 1995 photo book The Tunnel. The documentary Voices in the Tunnels by Vic David was released in 2008.

== Cities ==
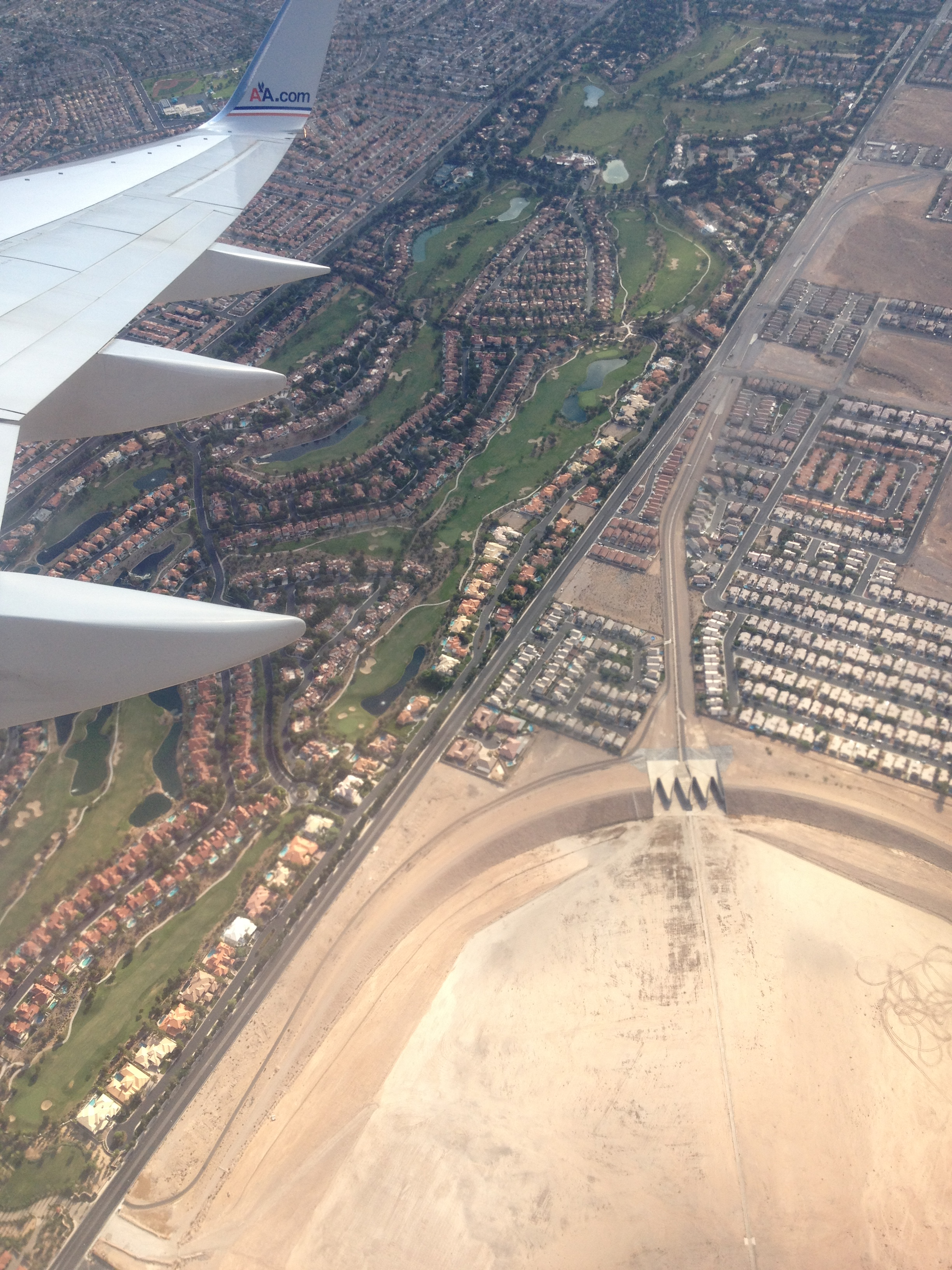
Entry into the Las Vegas flood control tunnels

=== Las Vegas ===
Media accounts have reported "mole people" living underneath other cities as well. In the Las Vegas Valley, it is estimated a thousand homeless people find shelter in the storm drains underneath the city for protection from extreme temperatures that exceeded 120 °F (49 °C) in the summer of 2024, while dropping below 30 °F (−1 °C) in winter.

According to media reports, the people living in the tunnels underneath Las Vegas have managed to furnish their "rooms". In one ABC News report from 2009, a couple, who had been living in the tunnels for five years, had furnished their home with a bed, bookcase and even a makeshift shower. The tunnels are prone to flooding, which can be extremely dangerous for the tunnel residents. Most lose their belongings regularly, and there have been some reported deaths.

Many tunnel inhabitants have been turned away from the limited charities in Las Vegas. Matt O'Brien, a local author who spent nearly five years exploring life beneath the city to write the book Beneath the Neon, founded the Shine A Light Foundation to help the homeless people taking refuge in the tunnels. The charity helps tunnel residents by providing supplies, such as underwear, bottled water, and food.

According to the Clark County Regional Flood Control District, the valley has about 450 miles (720 km) of flood control channels and tunnels, and about 300 miles (480 km) of those are underground.

== See also ==
- Avinguda de la Llum
- Sewer alligator
- Underground living
- Urban exploration, the exploration of man-made structures, including tunnels, as a hobby
