= The Mole People (book) =

1993 non-fiction book by Jennifer Toth

- Author: Jennifer Toth
- Language: English
- Publisher: Chicago Review Press
- Publication date: September 1, 1993
- Publication place: United States
- ISBN: 1-55652-190-1

The Mole People: Life in the Tunnels Beneath New York City is a 1993 book, presented as non-fiction, by American journalist Jennifer Toth. The book profiles a number of "mole people", homeless residents of New York City who live in abandoned tunnels and other subterranean structures. Reception to the book was mixed, with criticism focusing on its factual accuracy.

== Research ==
Toth became interested in "mole people" while working as a tutor in 1990, where she learned that one of the children she tutored lived in a subway tunnel. After further research, she met a police officer at Grand Central Station who knew some tunnel people, and then began speaking to the community.

== Reception ==
The book was reviewed by Publishers Weekly, who called it a "disturbing read". Kirkus Reviews called it "as saddening as it is gripping".

Jim Dwyer, writing for The Washington Post, called the book "honest and above all, loving, to people who are nobody's friends". He noted that the book's strengths came in its interviews, and "in the end, the wilder stories are overshadowed by the far simpler and far more touching portraits Toth presents of injured people struggling for dignity and tenderness". He also noted the lack of discussion of the city's policies towards homelessness, and that the book had some inaccuracies because Toth took people at their word rather than looking into official records.

The Los Angeles Times called the book a "balanced look" at the homeless population, noting that "she never takes sides with any one constituency" and "she deftly manages to reserve her emotional allegiance for the underground homeless themselves, while at the same time rejecting their paranoid tendency to deny the beneficence of all authorities above-ground".

Several decades later, the book has been compared negatively with the 2024 book Life Underground: Encounters with People Below the Streets of New York by sociologist Terry Williams, which similarly covers homeless residents living in subterranean New York City. One review compared Toth's push to find the "more and more extreme versions of tunnel life" unfavorably with Williams' straightforward portrayals of "shockingly normal [life], at least in the context of the chronically unsheltered homeless".

=== Scrutiny over accuracy ===
Joseph Brennan, a historian of the New York City subway systems, criticized the book in a 1996 post to his blog Abandoned Stations, saying of her tunnel descriptions, "every fact in this book that I can verify independently is wrong". He noted the most accurate tunnel descriptions were in regard to the Freedom Tunnel, "although they are still exaggerated (as to its length for example)". Brennan wrote that the descriptions of Grand Central Station "are not at all accurate as to tunnels, and are given as reports from other people or as generalizations of no stated source".

In January 2004, Cecil Adams of The Straight Dope wrote on the book after a reader wrote in with a question, saying he was "reasonably satisfied that the events in her book, God help us, happened as she described them". Following publication of the column, other readers wrote in with their doubts, and Adams contacted Toth with questions. Toth connected him with a woman named Cindy Fletcher, who "stayed in the tunnels on and off in the early 90s". Fletcher could not confirm Toth's descriptions of the underground communities, saying "I'm not saying the book is not true, I just never experienced the things [Toth] said she saw". Toth was also unable to answer how to enter some of the tunnels, which the book suggested she visited multiple times over the course of several months. After revisiting the book, Cecil Adams changed his conclusion, stating that "Parts of Toth's book are true, parts of it aren't, and you take your chances deciding which are which."
