= Subterranean New York City =

Area beneath the surface level of New York City

Map of the New York City Subway and PATH systems

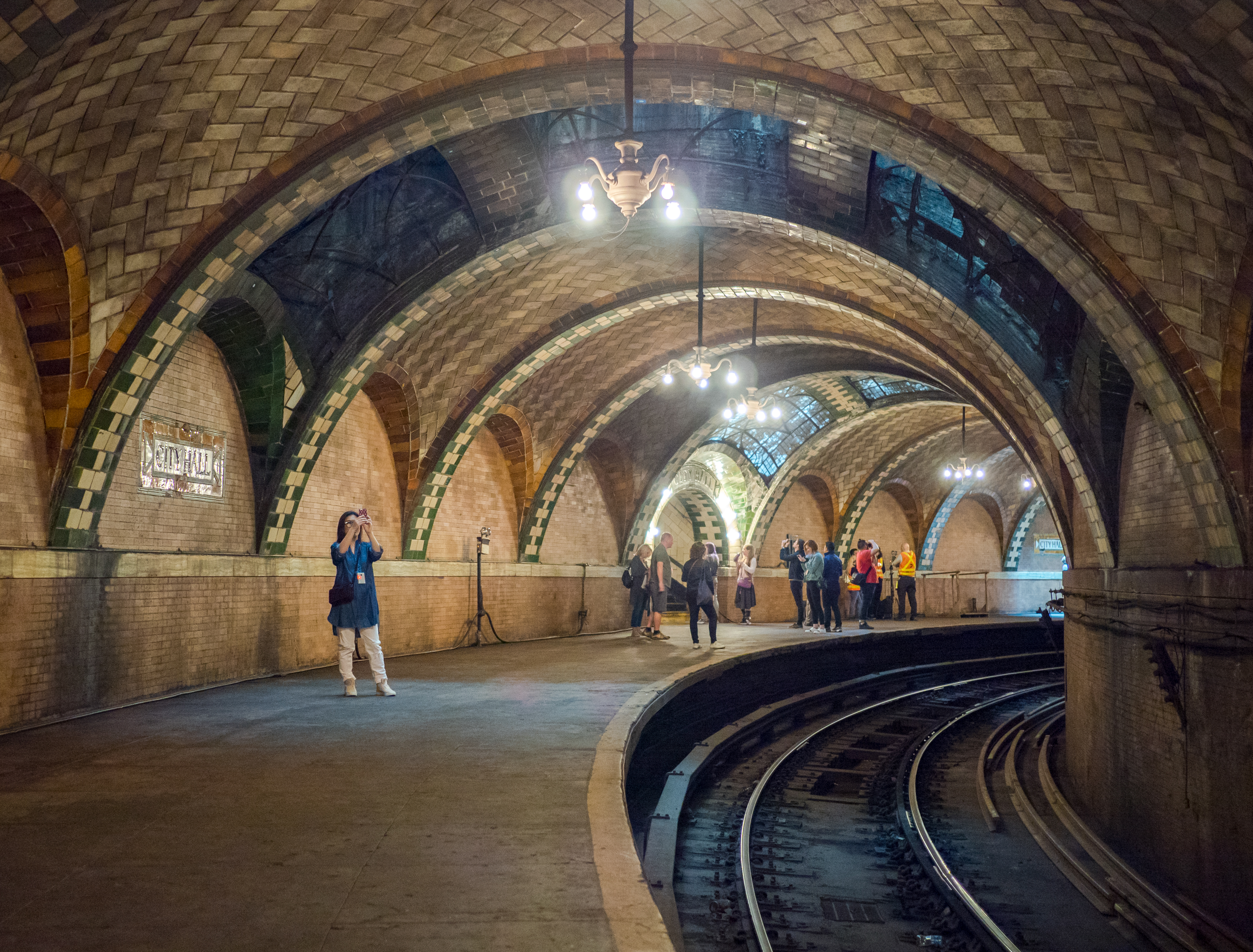
The City Hall subway station in Manhattan has been closed to the public since 1945.

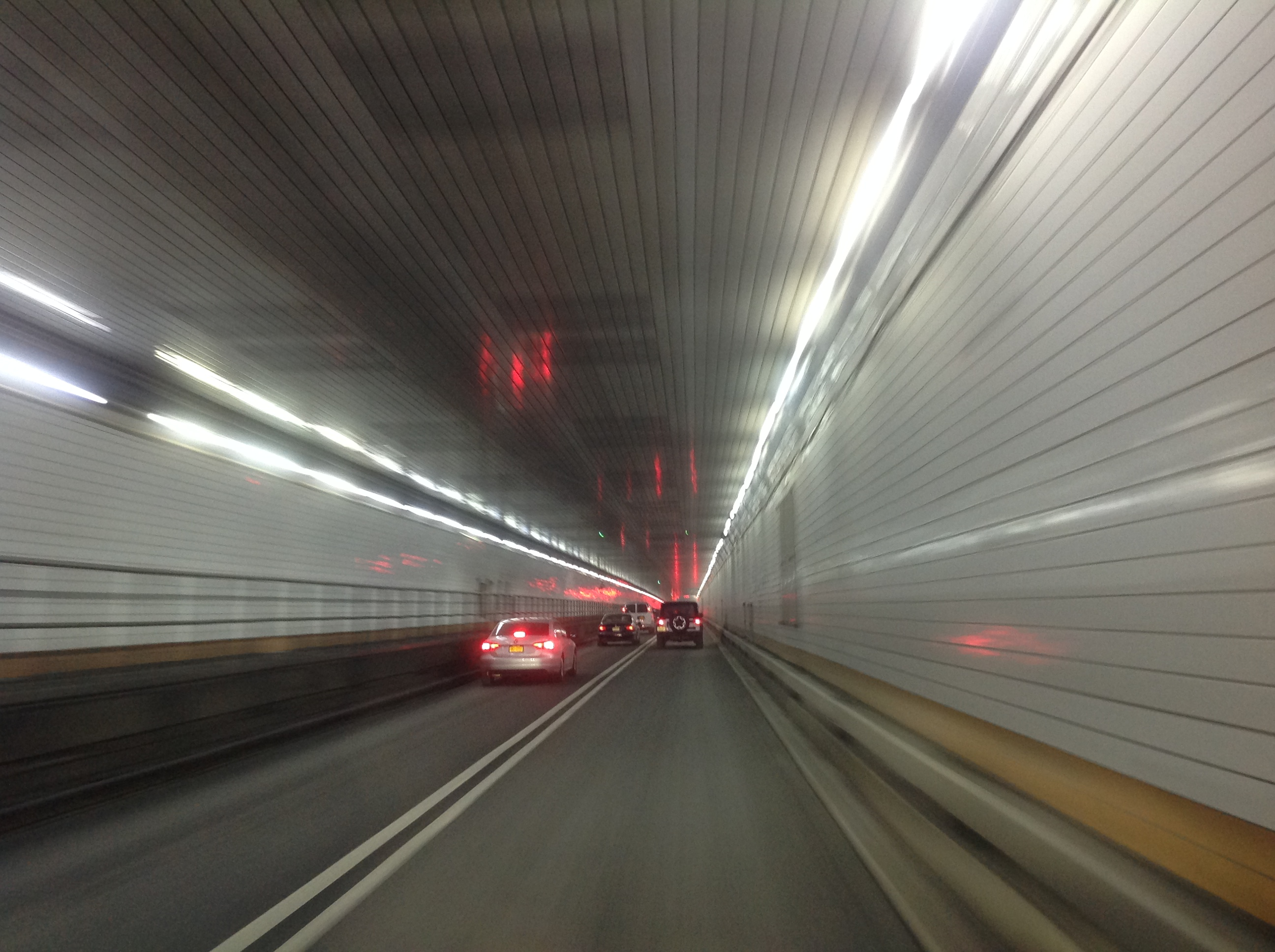
Operated by the Port Authority of New York and New Jersey, the Holland Tunnel is a vehicular tunnel that travels under the Hudson River, connecting Lower Manhattan to Jersey City. The tunnel was the world's first mechanically ventilated tunnel.

Subterranean New York City relates to the area beneath the surface level of New York City; the natural features, man-made structures, spaces, objects, and cultural creation and experience. Underground power lines and other utilities are usual in dense parts of the city. Like other subterranea, the underground world of New York City has been the basis of TV series, documentaries, artwork, and books.

== History ==
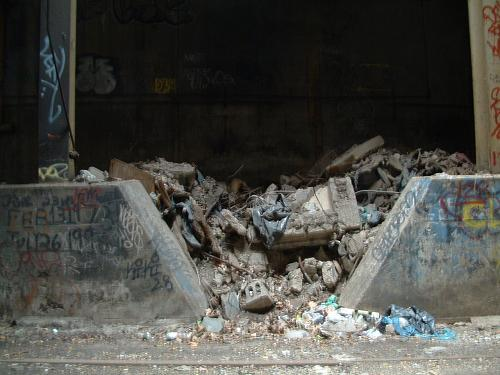
Demolished shantytown in the Freedom Tunnel in Manhattan.

Streams, springs and swamps were once a more prominent feature in New York City. Manhattan for instance has numerous tidally-affected streams that run beneath street level, their existence sub-surface due to development. An example is the Minetta Brook which exists beneath Minetta Lane in Greenwich Village. Water seepage is a problem in the underground spaces of New York and pumping is necessary to divert it elsewhere. The predominant bedrock underneath New York City is Manhattan Schist.

Some subterranean spaces of New York are inhabited by so-called Mole people. They were the subject of a 2008 documentary called Voices in the Tunnels.

Municipal services continued to develop and New York has an extensive sewerage system, steam lines, water channels and other utility systems; and a vast and sometimes deep network of underground space and passages. The workers who excavate this realm are called 'sandhogs' and their origin as an organized group goes back to 8 May 1872. Relics of the past exist beneath the surface, and engineering services have claimed to unearth the likes of old trolley tracks that exist beneath the tarmac and the pneumatic systems of the United States Treasury Department and United States Post Office; the latter of which went into service in 1872 for mail transport.

== Pop culture and art ==
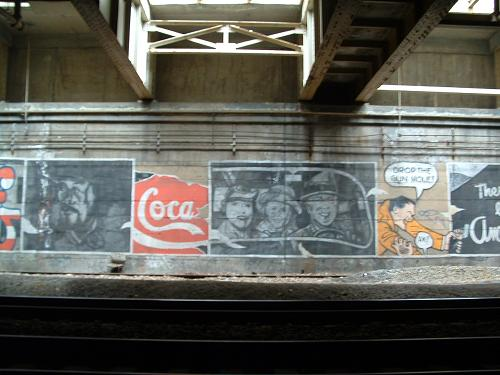
Graffiti in tunnel.

The underground world of New York City has been the subject of TV series, films, paintings and books. In the popular fictional TV series Teenage Mutant Ninja Turtles, the sewer system was the turtles' home and their means of navigating swiftly underneath the sprawling city above. Books involving the topic include The Underland Chronicles, Downsiders, Visages Immobiles and the Marvel comic series Morlocks. New York Sewer Alligators have been a legend for decades.

As an artistic subject, the New York City Subway was painted by Mark Rothko in his 'subway series', with expression of the architectural elements and space, in contrast to the scenes depicted in the book Manhattan Transfer by Don Passo which detail the hustle and bustle of people. Graffiti artists have used New York's sub-terranea and associated objects as the canvas itself, painting and writing on subways and trains. New York in the 1970s and 1980s is regularly considered the height of subway art.

The abandoned Cobble Hill railroad tunnel was the subject of a segment on an episode of the U.S History Channel's Cities of the Underworld.

In the late 1990s, following on from an article about the subject, the National Geographic created a feature on their website where users could digitally explore elements of subterranean New York.

== Public transport ==
=== Rail ===
- New York City Subway
- PATH
- Park Avenue main line
- East Side Access
- Freedom Tunnel

=== Road ===
- Battery Tunnel
- Holland Tunnel
- Lincoln Tunnel
- Midtown Tunnel

== Municipal services ==
- Croton Aqueduct

== See also ==
- Underground city
- Subterranean fiction
- Subterranean London
- Chicago Pedway

== Sources ==
- Lindner, Christopher (2015). Imagining New York City - Literature, Urbanism, and the Visual Arts, 1890-1940. Oxford University Press. ISBN 9780195375145.
- Solis, Julia (2020). New York Underground The Anatomy of a City. Taylor & Francis. ISBN 9781000143614.
- Ovenden, Mark (2020). Underground Cities Mapping the Tunnels, Transits and Networks Underneath Our Feet. Frances Lincoln. ISBN 9781781318942.
