= Dark Days (film) =

- Theatrical release poster
- Directed by: Marc Singer
- Produced by: Marc Singer
- Cinematography: Marc Singer
- Edited by: Melissa Neidich
- Music by: DJ Shadow
- Production company: Picture Farm Productions
- Distributed by: Palm Pictures
- Release date: August 30, 2000 (United States)
- Running time: 82 minutes
- Country: United States
- Language: English

Dark Days is an American documentary film directed, produced, and photographed by the English documentarian Marc Singer that was completed and released in 2000. Shot during the mid-1990s, it follows a group of people who lived in the Freedom Tunnel section of the Amtrak system at the time. DJ Shadow created new music for the documentary and also let Singer use some of his existing songs.

== Background ==
When Marc Singer arrived in Manhattan, he was struck by the number of people he saw living on the streets. He befriended many in New York's homeless community and, after hearing about people who lived underground in abandoned tunnel systems, he met and became close to some members of the Freedom Tunnel community, which stretched north from Penn Station past Harlem. After living in the tunnel on and off for a number of months, Singer decided to create a documentary, even though he had never made a film before, hoping that the project would make enough money for the residents of the tunnel to move into better housing.

== Production ==
The filming took two-and-a-half years. The film's crew consisted of the subjects themselves, who rigged up makeshift lighting and dollies and learned to use a 16mm camera with black-and-white film.

During filming, Amtrak announced it would be forcibly evicting the people living in the tunnels in order to reroute their trains through the tunnel. This announcement, plus the police presence backing the decision, prompted Singer and photographer Margaret Morton to go to the Coalition for the Homeless for help. Eventually, Singer and Morton managed to secure housing vouchers from the Department of Housing and Urban Development for the film's subjects, which enabled them to move out of the tunnels and into their own apartments.

The post-production process for the film took years, with delays caused by financial difficulties and Singer's insistence on creative control to protect the tunnel residents. Melissa Neidich was the editor of the film.

== Soundtrack ==
The film features music by DJ Shadow. Included in the score are excerpts from Endtroducing..... and his album with Unkle, as well as original music he composed for the main theme of the film, which was released on the single "Dark Days".

== Release and reception ==
Dark Days was released in 2000. It won three awards at the 2000 Sundance Film Festival (Audience Award Documentary, Excellence in Cinematography Award: Documentary, and Freedom of Expression Award), was chosen as the Senior Programmer's Pick at the 2000 SXSW Film Awards, and was nominated for awards at several other film festivals. The film also won the Independent Spirit Award for Best Documentary Feature and the Los Angeles Film Critics Association Award for Best Documentary Film.

=== Tenth anniversary re-release ===
Oscilloscope Laboratories re-released "Dark Days" theatrically at Cinema Village in New York City on July 1, 2011, as well as on DVD on July 19, 2011. The DVD contains several new features compiled especially for the special tenth anniversary release, including footage of Singer revisiting the Freedom Tunnel in 2011 and a "where are they now" video that details what happened to the tunnel residents after the documentary was filmed. The film was re-released by Dogwoof Pictures in the U.K., with the home video release including the additional features and interviews.

== See also ==
- Mole people, homeless people living under large cities in abandoned subway, railroad, flood, and sewage tunnels
- Voices in the Tunnels, a 2008 documentary film on New York City tunnel inhabitants by filmmaker Vic David
- Tunnel People, a book on New York City tunnel inhabitants by anthropologist and journalist Teun Voeten, originally published in Dutch in 1996 and revised for an English edition published in 2010.
