= Chris Pape =

American graffiti artist

Freedom SA
- Born: Chris Pape
- Education: Fiorello H. LaGuardia High School
- Known for: Monochromatic artwork on the 1 line
- Notable work: The Freedom Tunnel
- Movement: Graffiti
- Website: chrisfreedompape on Instagram

Chris Pape, known by his tag Freedom, is an American painter and graffiti artist. He started tagging subway tunnels and subway cars in 1974 as "Gen II" before adopting the tag "Freedom". Pape is best known for his numerous paintings in the eponymous Freedom Tunnel, an Amtrak tunnel running underneath Manhattan's Riverside Park. Prominent paintings in the Freedom Tunnel attributed to Pape include his "self-portrait", featuring a male torso with a spray-can head, and "There's No Way Like the American Way" (aka "The Coca-Cola Mural"), a parody of Coca-Cola advertising and tribute to the evicted homeless of the tunnel. Another theme of Freedom's work is black and silver recreations of classical art, including a reinterpretation of the Venus de Milo and a full train car recreation of the iconic hands from Michelangelo's Sistine Chapel. Chris Pape also was one of the first documentarians to cover the mole people, homeless living underground in the Freedom Tunnel.
