= Freedom Tunnel =

Railroad tunnel in Manhattan, New York

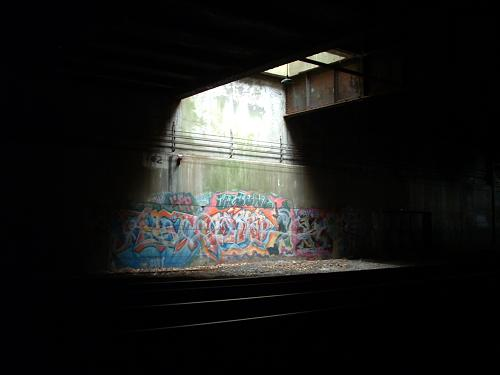
Most graffiti is centered under the light

The Freedom Tunnel is a railroad tunnel carrying the West Side Line under Riverside Park in Manhattan, New York City. Used by Amtrak trains to and from Pennsylvania Station, it got its name because the graffiti artist Chris "Freedom" Pape used the tunnel walls to create some of his most notable artwork. The name may also be a reference to the former shantytowns built within the tunnel by homeless populations seeking shelter and freedom to live rent-free and unsupervised by law enforcement. The tunnel runs approximately 2.6 miles (4.2 km), from 72nd Street to 124th Street.

== History ==
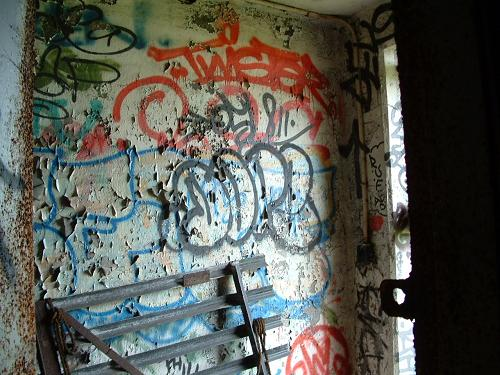
Exits at many points let in light and noise from the nearby playgrounds and parks.

The tunnel was built by Robert Moses in the 1930s to expand park space for Upper West Side residents – although the construction of Moses's Henry Hudson Parkway in the same area effectively blocked access to the river.

The tunnel's south portal originally opened into the 60th Street Yard. However, when the yard was redeveloped into Riverside South in the late 1990s and 2000s, the tracks south of the tunnel were also covered.

After it was completed, the tunnel was used for freight trains until 1980, when regular operations ended. The railroad favored using yards in the Bronx and New Jersey, and increased use of trucking led to the demise of the West Side Line. The giant, man-made caverns became a haven for homeless people. At its height in 1994, nearly a hundred people lived in the tunnel.

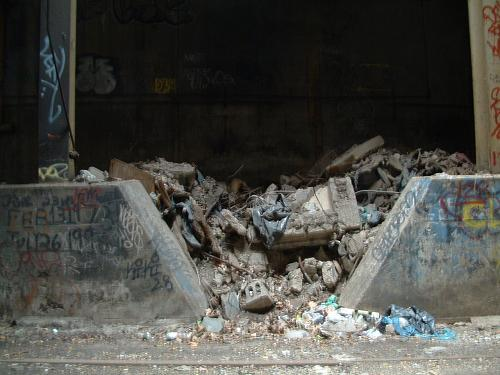
Demolished shantytowns

On April 4, 1991, the tunnel was reopened for trains of the Amtrak Empire Connection, and a massive eviction followed. The shantytowns were bulldozed and the tunnel was chained off. To this day, however, graffiti artists and urban explorers continue to visit the tunnel, while the homeless population has been mostly displaced. Around 2014 and 2015, graffiti artists and urban explorers were sporadically caught and escorted out by Amtrak Police.

== Artwork ==
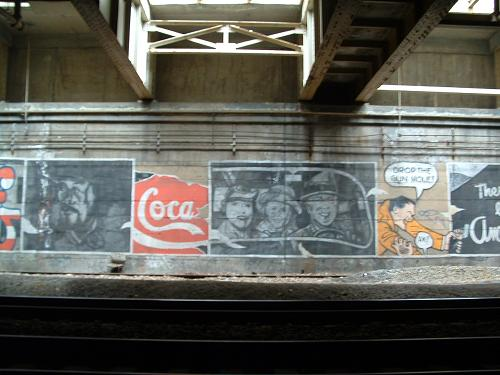
Graffiti in the tunnel

Over the tunnel's years of disuse, its isolated nature allowed graffiti artists and street artists to work without fear of arrest, leading to larger and more ambitious pieces. The tunnel has unique lighting provided by grates in the sidewalks of Riverside Park above the space. The descending shafts of light allow graffiti art to be seen in the gloom, and artists would often center their projects under the light to take advantage of the spot-lighting effect as if in a gallery.

After achieving popularity in the book Spraycan Art by James Prigoff and Henry Chalfant, graffiti artists began to flock to the Freedom Tunnel and gained access through a series of broken gates near 103rd Street and Riverside Park. Early artists who left their mark on the tunnel included the duo Sane Smith, Ghost, Twist, Dan Plasma, Cost, and Revs. Until the construction of the Trump Riverside development, the south end of the tunnel terminated in a large open area. In the 1980s and 1990s, a tent city with pirated electricity and hundreds, perhaps thousands of dwellers existed in the south end of the tunnel. Retired trains were also permanently parked near the south end of the tunnel allowing artists to cover whole cars with paint and murals, even if the cars themselves never left the tunnels. However, the homeless population was gradually relocated from the tunnel to other places. "Freedom" dedicated one of the tunnel's murals to the former homeless population there.

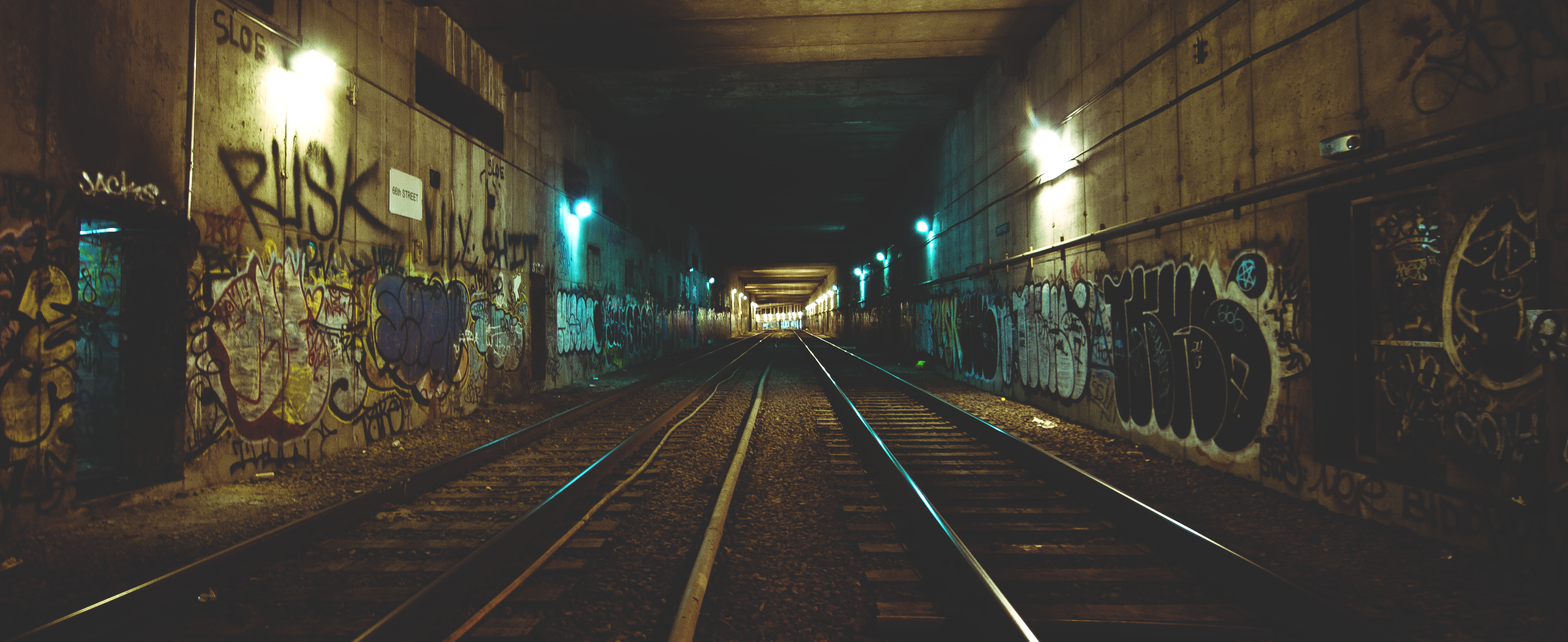
Seen in 2013

Works by "Freedom" remained mostly untouched and respected by taggers. A notable exception was the recreation of Francisco Goya's The Third of May, which was defaced, but subsequently restored by Freedom. In addition, there are numerous other murals on the walls in the 90- and 100-block areas of the tunnel; including a chiaroscuro style study of the Venus de Milo, and original portraits rendered with impressionistic splashes of color. The centerpiece of the tunnel is a mural painted in the style of a comic book that tells an abstract story that seems to reference the relationship of the former residents of the tunnel, the city government, and the police. Other historical pieces range from Michelangelo to Norman Rockwell.

Beginning in late 2009, Amtrak began to aggressively repaint the tunnels in an effort to restore their original appearance. Nearly all of the tunnel's interior walls south of 91st Street were repainted, resulting in many murals disappearing, including the centerpiece mural by Freedom and Smith commemorating the former residents of the tunnel. For unknown reasons, Amtrak did not finish repainting the tunnel walls north of 91st Street. Today, all of the walls that were repainted have been covered by new layers of graffiti.

Around 2010, the Third of May mural suffered major water damage due to a leak in the tunnel directly above.

== Documentaries and books ==
The Freedom Tunnel and the homeless people that were living there in the mid-1990s are mentioned in numerous book and documentaries; some of the notable ones include:

- Jennifer Toth documented the homeless residents in her book The Mole People (1993).
- Photographer Margaret Morton made the photo book The Tunnel (1995).
- Marc Singer made the documentary Dark Days (2000) about the tunnel, using footage shot in the mid-1990s. Singer's later visit to the tunnel in 2011 is included in the film's 10th anniversary DVD release.
- Anthropologist and journalist Teun Voeten wrote the very detailed Tunnel People (2010).

== See also ==
- Graffiti in the United States
- Urban exploration

== Sources ==
- Stern, Robert A. M.; Gilmartin, Patrick; Mellins, Thomas (1987). New York 1930: Architecture and Urbanism Between the Two World Wars (1930 ed.). New York: Rizzoli. ISBN 978-0-8478-3096-1.
