= Matthew O'Brien =

American author, journalist, editor and teacher (born 1970)

- Born: September 4, 1970 (age 56); Washington, D.C., U.S.
- Education: Georgia State University; University of West Georgia (BA); University of Nevada Las Vegas (MFA)
- Occupations: Author; editor; journalist; teacher
- Writing career
- Genres: Creative nonfiction; Fiction; Poetry
- Subjects: Las Vegas; Homelessness; Drug abuse; Mental illness; Popular culture
- Notable works: Beneath the Neon; My Week at the Blue Angel; Dark Days, Bright Nights
- Website: beneaththeneon.com

Matthew O'Brien (born in 1970) is an American author, journalist, editor and teacher who writes about the seedier side of Las Vegas. His most well-known work is the nonfiction book Beneath the Neon, which documents the homeless population living in the underground flood channels of the Las Vegas Valley. He lived in Las Vegas from 1997 to 2017.

== Early life and education ==
O'Brien grew up in the Atlanta, Georgia, area. He graduated in 1988 from Decatur High School, where he was a shooting guard on the basketball team. He attended Georgia State University and was a member of the team that advanced to the 1991 NCAA Division I men's basketball tournament. He was also a member of the University of West Georgia's 1993-'94 team, which qualified for the NCAA Division II men's basketball tournament. O'Brien graduated from West Georgia with a Bachelor's degree in history. He taught English and in the Honors College at the University of Nevada, Las Vegas, where he earned a MFA in creative writing.

== Career ==
He worked as a staff writer, news editor and managing editor of the alternative weekly Las Vegas CityLife from 2000 to 2008. While at the paper, he co-wrote two cover stories about exploring the underground flood channels of Las Vegas after reading about Timmy "TJ" Weber, who was suspected (and later convicted) of murdering his girlfriend and her son, raping her daughter and attempting to kill another son. Weber used the drains to evade the police.

His research about and interviews from inside the underground flood channels are detailed in his book Beneath the Neon: Life and Death in the Tunnels of Las Vegas, released in June 2007. This book has been reviewed or written about by several media outlets, including Publishers Weekly, Kirkus Reviews, Wired, Der Spiegel, Le Monde, and the Atlanta Journal-Constitution. Nightline, The CBS Evening News with Katie Couric, Al Jazeera, CNN, NPR, the BBC, the Associated Press and other national and international media outlets have done stories about the tunnels and the tunnel-dwellers.

CNN's Michael Cary went into the tunnels with O'Brien and described him as "an expert on the more than 300 miles of underground flood channels and its tunnel dwellers."

O'Brien's second book, My Week at the Blue Angel: And Other Stories from the Storm Drains, Strip Clubs, and Trailer Parks of Las Vegas, released November 15, 2010, is a collection of creative-nonfiction stories set in off-the-beaten-path Vegas, including the Blue Angel Motel on East Fremont Street that was known for prostitution, drug dealing and violence, and the case of Jessie Foster, an international endangered missing Canadian woman lured to Las Vegas who disappeared 10 months later. Jessie is thought to be the victim of human trafficking. Earlier versions of many of the stories in the collection were originally cover stories in Las Vegas CityLife.

O'Brien is the founder of Shine a Light, a nonprofit organization that provides housing, drug counseling and other services to the homeless people living in the drains. In a January 2011 article, the Atlanta Journal-Constitution described how O'Brien's work in the tunnels "turned into a 4½-year obsession for O'Brien, where he wound up documenting a population he suspects no one except a handful of police officers knew existed." CBS News correspondent Seth Doane, who went underneath the Las Vegas Strip with O'Brien in the summer of 2010, wrote that "O'Brien's interest has turned into advocacy" in his efforts to help the homeless.

American Public Media's "The Story" segment covered O'Brien's efforts to help homeless people when they interviewed O'Brien and featured a homeless man in April 2011.

On September 3 and 4, 2013, O'Brien appeared on the Dr. Phil Show in a two-part series after O'Brien escorted professional locator Troy Dunn into the underground flood channels of Las Vegas. There, they found a homeless mother, Cyndi, who'd been separated from her four daughters for several years. In the second episode of the show, Cyndi appeared with Dr. Phil and reunited with her daughters in the studio. At the end of the show, Dr. Phil offered Cyndi and her husband, Rick, rehab and family-counseling services, which they accepted. Dr. Phil discussed O'Brien's book Beneath the Neon.

In March 2015, Seeker (media company) profiled O'Brien on the air as he explored the tunnels and interacted with residents.

In January 2016, O'Brien raised more than $13,000 in 24 hours through Crowdrise for his nonprofit Shine a Light to benefit homeless people living in tunnels beneath the Las Vegas Strip.

After three tunnel dwellers died in June 2016 in a flash flood, O'Brien and a homeless man known as "Jazz" appeared on NPR's southern Nevada affiliate KNPR to talk about the flood, in which Jazz's longtime girlfriend Sharon drowned. O'Brien's nonprofit, Shine a Light, helped one of the flood victim's families with expenses surrounding the death.

In July 2017, O'Brien relocated to San Salvador in Central America to teach literature at an English-language preparatory school and to write a follow-up to Beneath the Neon about the homeless people who made it out of the storm drains. In a front-page article about O'Brien, the Las Vegas Review-Journal described his move out of the country as the "man who shined light on Las Vegas' tunnel dwellers (is) moving on."

Central Recovery Press released the sequel, titled Dark Days, Bright Nights: Surviving the Las Vegas Storm Drains, in November 2020. Kirkus Reviews noted that the book "chronicles how one group of homeless people were able to leave tunnel life behind," while Coachella Valley Independent described it as "redemption stories" that "cast light on a rarely seen side of Las Vegas and offer a portrait of homelessness and recovery in America." On November 17, on Dark Days, Bright Nights' release date, the Reno Gazette Journal published a related feature story profiling "Half Pint," one of the book’s interviewees, and detailed O’Brien’s background with the tunnels. USA Today picked up the story and ran the article.

His three books are creative nonfiction/literary journalism, but he has also published fiction and poetry. His fiction and poetry have appeared in books, journals, and exhibits, including Interim, Winged Penny Review, Twenty-two Twenty-eight, The Argyle, New Critique and On the Premises. As of March 2024, according to J David Osborne and Kris Saknussemm's Lost Xplorers podcast, Matt was working on a collection of short stories set on the streets of Vegas.

On April 15, 2025, O’Brien returned to his undergrad alma mater, the University of West Georgia, for the first time since graduating from the school thirty years earlier. He was in conversation, as part of the school's Sewell Lecture Series, with professor of political science Sal Peralta and professor of creative writing Alison Umminger about his journey from Carrollton, Ga., to Las Vegas to El Salvador. In a personal blog post written after the event, he said his return to West Georgia was one of the more memorable nights of his writing career.

== Awards ==
O'Brien received two Artists Fellowship grants awarded by the Nevada Arts Council in 2007 and 2010 for his nonfiction book projects.

He has won several first-place awards in the Nevada Press Association's Better Newspaper Contest, including Journalist of Merit (given to journalists with less than five years of experience to encourage them to stay in the business) in 2002 and Outstanding Journalist (a top individual award) in 2006.

In November 2011, O'Brien was given the Nevada Writers Hall of Fame Silver Pen Award, sponsored by the Friends of the University of Nevada, Reno Libraries. Established in 1996, the Silver Pen recognizes writers who are in mid-career but have already shown substantial achievement. After the announcement of the award, The Nevada Review featured O'Brien in a Q&A article.

== Books ==
- Beneath the Neon (Huntington Press, 2007)
- My Week at the Blue Angel (Huntington Press, 2010)
- Dark Days, Bright Nights (Central Recovery Press, 2020)

=== Reviews ===
About O'Brien's book Beneath the Neon, Publishers Weekly wrote, “Continually contrasting the sparkling casinos above with the dank, cobwebbed catacombs below, the observant O’Brien writes with a noirish flair, but his compassion is also evident as he illuminates the lives of these shadowy subterranean dwellers.”

The Las Vegas Review-Journal wrote, “Beneath the Neon accomplishes something most books about Las Vegas do not: It tells us something we didn’t know.”

Reviewer Tod Goldberg wrote in Las Vegas CityLife, "My Week at the Blue Angel finds O'Brien once again searching underneath things for proof that not all is as it first appears. ... But it's when O'Brien talks to people who've seen the edge and blown right past it that his attention to detail as a writer serves him best."

Midwest Book Review wrote, “With plenty of black-and-white photos, My Week at the Blue Angel is a fun and intriguing read that will prove very hard to put down.”

About Dark Days, Bright Nights, Kirkus Reviews wrote, “Powerful and relentlessly honest, the interviews explode myths surrounding homelessness while promoting compassionate views of the growing number of homeless Americans. Compelling reading about what is a depressingly evergreen societal ill.”

About Dark Days, Bright Nights, the Las Vegas Weekly wrote, “With his 2007 book Beneath the Neon: Life and Death in the Tunnels of Las Vegas, the journalist told the story of an oft-overlooked and unfortunate population. In his latest book, O’Brien tells the stories of 36 people who lived in the storm drains and attempted to build a better life for themselves. Though some don’t succeed, O’Brien offers many uplifting tales of recovery in this oral history.”
