= Ed Zotti =

American journalist (born 1951)

Ed Zotti (born 1951) is a journalist and urban transit planner in Chicago, Illinois. He is credited as being the "editor and confidant" of Cecil Adams, the pseudonym of the writer of the column "The Straight Dope", published by the Chicago Reader and nationally syndicated from 1997 to 2018.

== Biography ==
Zotti is a native of Chicago, Illinois. He attended high school at Archbishop Quigley Preparatory Seminary, where he served as editor of student newspapers. He graduated from Northwestern University, majoring in journalism.

Zotti has worked as a journalist and an urban transit planner. In addition to his work on "The Straight Dope" column and books, Zotti is also the author of The Barn House, Confessions of an Urban Rehabber as well as Operation Netiquette: Moderating for Minors. Zotti also moderates the Barn House message board which has logged almost 1800 posts since its founding in 2008.

== Straight Dope editor ==
Zotti became the editor of "The Straight Dope" column in 1978, with offices located in the building of the Chicago Reader broadsheet. He succeeded Mike Lenehan, who edited the column from its inception in 1973 until 1976, and who was later promoted to Executive Editor at the Chicago Reader, and Dave Kehr, who edited from 1976 to 1978 and who later became a noted film critic for The New York Times.

Zotti has been very cagey about his actual role in the construction of the "Straight Dope" column and the answering of queries, and has been largely responsible for the mythos surrounding the identity of "Cecil Adams". Several statements give credence to the notion that "Cecil Adams" actually refers to a collective organization of researchers and writers, with Zotti as chief editor: William Poundstone's 1993 book Biggest Secrets, which exposed a variety of professional, trade, and entertainment secrets, refers to Cecil as "a guy named Ed Zotti".

When asked in a 2011 interview about the claim that he "was" Cecil Adams, Zotti obliquely de-emphasized his individual role in the column while simultaneously alluding to the larger organization (copy editors and research assistants) that author the column, stating "There are layers within layers. That’s not to say there isn't some underlying reality to the myth. I do much of Cecil's typing, but Cecil presides. Editors will come and go. I'll get hit by a bus some day, but Cecil will be eternal. That's all people need to know."
