= Tunnel People =

Book by Teun Voeten

- First edition (Dutch)
- Author: Teun Voeten
- Original title: Tunnelmensen
- Language: Dutch, English
- Genre: anthropological-journalistic account
- Publisher: Atlas Publishers, PM Press
- Publication date: 1996
- Publication place: United States
- English publication date: August 2010
- Pages: 320, includes one map and one 16-page b&w photo insert
- ISBN: 978-1-60486-070-2

Tunnel People (Dutch title: Tunnelmensen) is an anthropological-journalistic account describing an underground homeless community in New York City. It is written by war photographer and anthropologist Teun Voeten and was initially published in his native Dutch in 1996, and a revised English version was published by the Oakland-based independent publishing house PM Press in 2010.

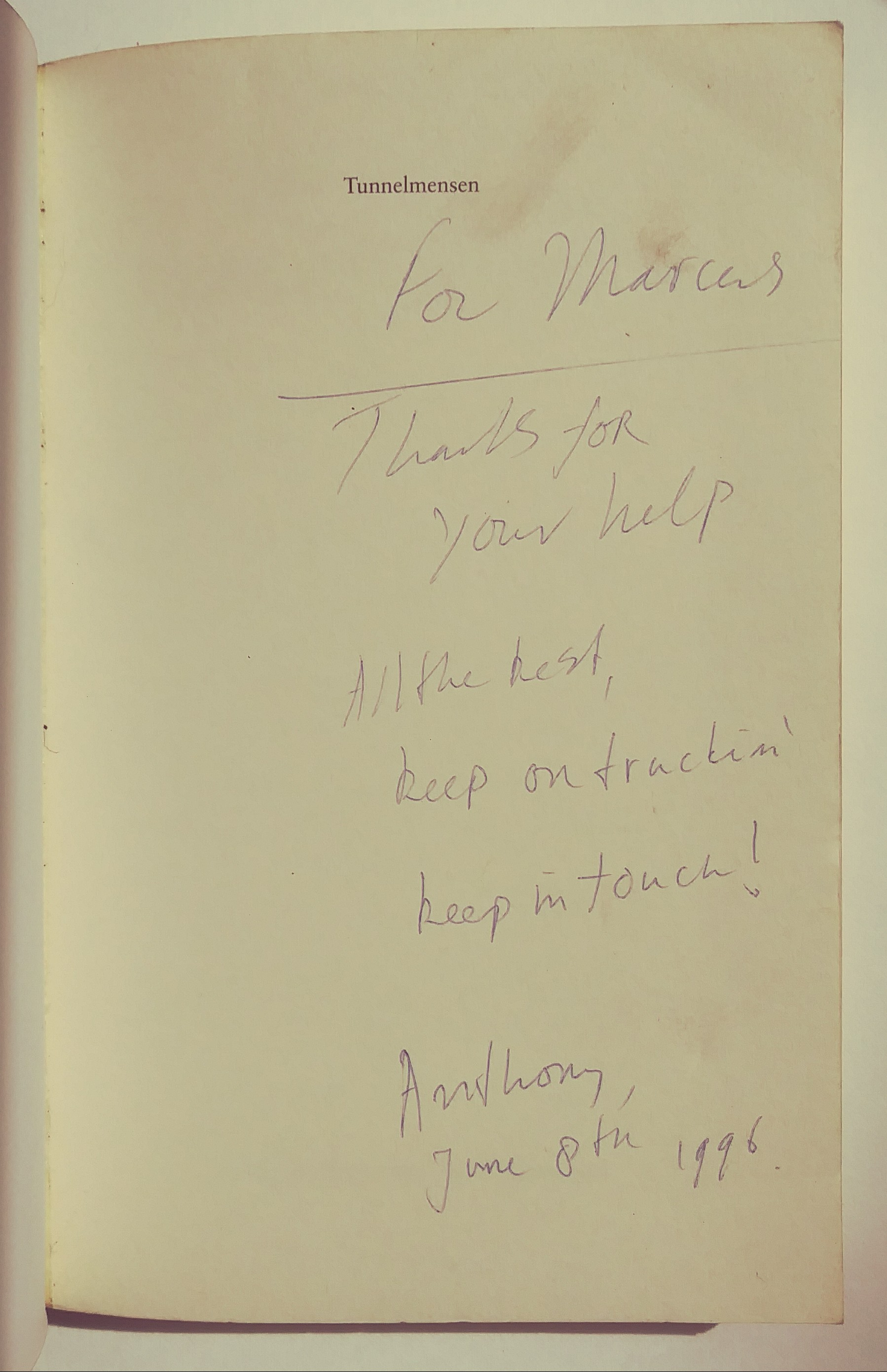
Inscribed copy Voeten gave Marcus, one of his subjects; see "Content" for Voeten's note (on his letterhead) to Marcus that was folded into this copy

== Background ==
In the late 1980s and early 1990s New York, thousands of the homeless roamed the streets. Most slept on the streets or in shelters, but a small group of them went underground and took refuge in the huge system of subway and train tunnels. One of the biggest and most accessible groups of these homeless people lived in part of the Amtrak tunnel, which runs for 50 blocks under Manhattan’s Riverside Park. Over time the tunnel became home to some 75 people who lived scattered in small groups in self made shacks, in empty maintenance bunkers, or in recesses and caves along the tunnel wall. Graffiti artists used the blank cement spaces as canvases for their work and named it the Freedom Tunnel.

Several journalists wrote articles and made documentaries about tunnel life and the individuals living there. However, few of the journalists spent much time underground and some produced stories which lacked the necessary intimate knowledge of their subjects to be completely accurate.

The tunnel people were evicted in 1996, but Amtrak and homeless organizations were able, with support from the federal government, to develop a plan that would offer them alternative housing. Journalists who had established relations of trust with the tunnel people, such as Marc Singer, Margaret Morton and the author helped the tunnel people through the administrative process. Some succeeded in starting new lives above ground. Currently, the original tunnel is sealed off and all uninhabitable structures are pulled down and destroyed. Nevertheless, a few individuals still live underground, but the city appears to tolerate them as long as they do not erect permanent structures.

== Living with the tunnel people ==
Teun Voeten was brought into the tunnel by Terry Williams, an ethnographer from the New School of Social Research. There he was introduced to one of the tunnel residents, Bernard Isaac, who became his guide. After a few visits, Voeten asked Isaac for permission to join the tunnel people in taking up residence there. Isaac agreed, and Voeten was given an empty bunker in his camp. Voeten lived there full-time for a period of 5 months, from the winter of 1994 and into the summer of 1995. By helping the people with their work, mainly collecting redeemable cans, and sharing their daily life, Voeten gained the confidence of many tunnel dwellers and obtained a wealth of ethnographic details about tunnel life and homeless life in the mid 90s.

== Content ==
Tunnel People focuses on the lives of a few individuals: Bernard Isaacs, the main character in the book. He is a well mannered and eloquent man who has been nicknamed "Lord of the Tunnel"; Isaacs' neighbor Bob, a former short order cook with a drug problem; Tony, A Puerto Rican ex-convict; Marcus, a macrobiotic hippie; and Julio, another Puerto Rican young man who is an alcoholic. There are also Estoban, a Cuban refugee who lost all his papers; his Cuban neighbors Poncho and Getulio; Joe and Kathy, a reclusive Vietnam veteran and his wife who keep 20 cats; Frankie, a young runaway and his friend Ment, who appears always to run into trouble with the law.

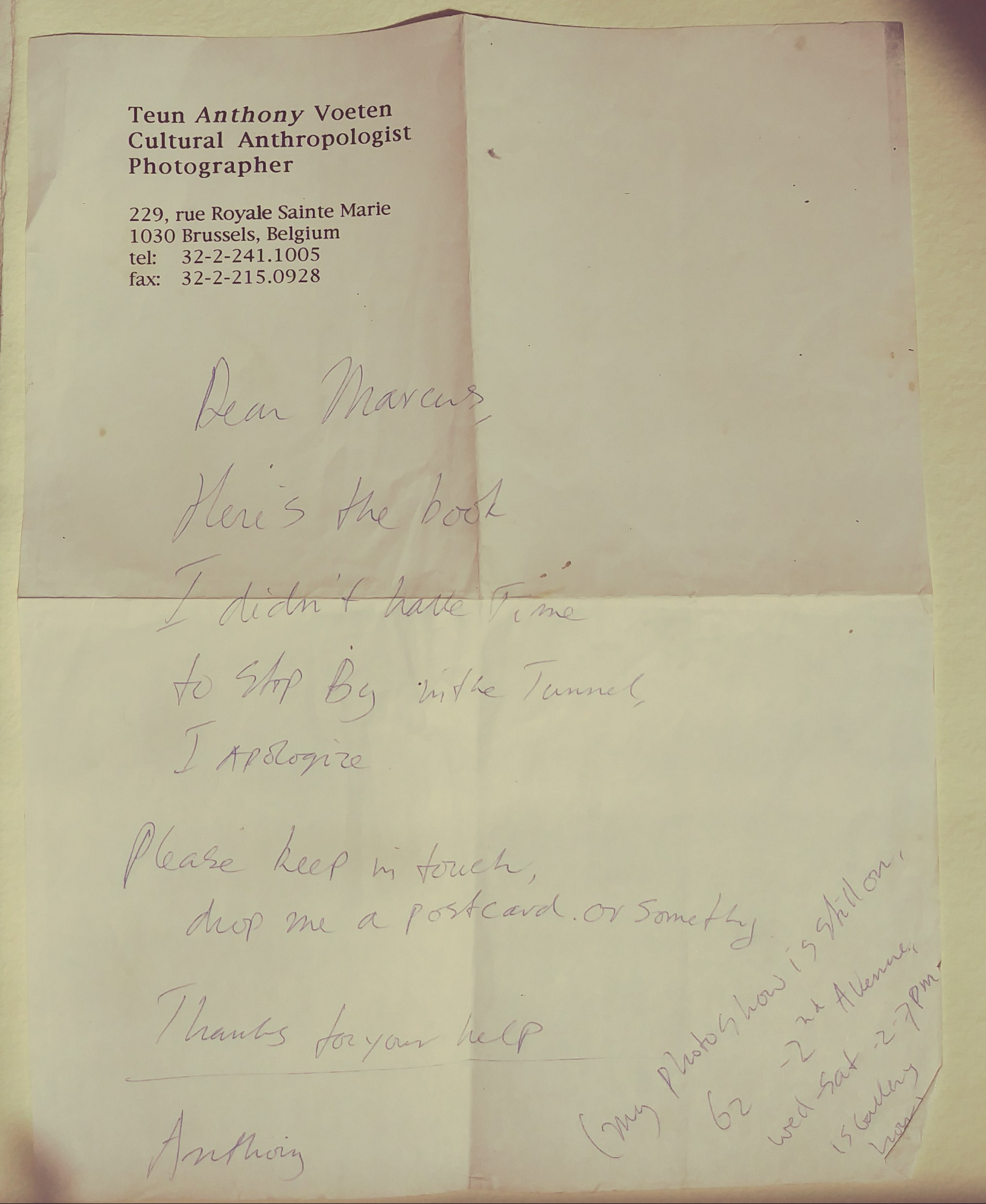
Note from Voeten to Marcus, one of the subjects of Tunnel People

Voeten describes the events of their daily lives in great detail, sometimes literally transcribing their conversations. Several chapters are devoted to the economy of the homeless. Contrary to popular assumptions, the homeless in the tunnel do not primarily resort to begging, but have developed quite sophisticated ways to generate income. Some trade books and items they find on the streets; most however collect cans and redeem them for 5 cents a piece at supermarkets. One chapter is a discussion of homelessness in which Voeten makes an inventory of the most important literature on homelessness then in existence. In another chapter, Voeten researches the many organizations that cater to the homeless. In many interviews, he speaks with aid workers, policemen and subway officials who work with homeless people. The last chapters of the book are devoted how the tunnel people are dealing with their upcoming eviction. In the updated U.S. version of the book, Voeten was able to track down many tunnel dwellers and relates their present circumstances in additional chapters. In a separate section are 32 black and white photos made by the author himself.

== Publication history ==
Tunnel People was first published in 1996 under the title Tunnelmensen by Atlas Publishers, Amsterdam. The U.S. edition that was released in 2010 was translated by author Teun Voeten himself. In this last edition he added a few new chapters in which he tracks down most tunnel dwellers and described what happened with them in the thirteen years since the original book was published.

== See also ==
- The Mole People, Jennifer Toth
- Dark Days (Documentary Film), Marc Singer
