= Diana Balmori =

American landscape designer (1932–2016)

- Born: June 4, 1932; Gijon, Spain
- Died: 2016 (aged 83–84); New York City, NY, US
- Education: National University of Tucuman, University of California at Los Angeles
- Occupation: Landscape architect
- Known for: Landscape architect
- Parent(s): Dorothy Ling, Clemente Hernando Balmori

Diana Balmori Ling (June 4, 1932 – November 14, 2016) was a landscape and urban designer. She was the founder of the landscape design firm Balmori Associates.

== Early life and education ==
Born in Gijón, Spain, Diana Balmori spent most of her childhood in Spain and England before her family settled in Argentina. Her mother Dorothy Ling (born in England) was a musician and musicologist. Her father Clemente Hernando Balmori (born in Spain) was a linguistic expert. At an early age Balmori learned to sing, dance, play piano, and her parents encouraged her to explore a wide range of mediums. She brought many of these influences with her into the design world.

She graduated from high school at the age of 16 and studied at the Architecture School at the National University of Tucumán in Argentina, in the undergraduate program. It was there she met her future husband, César Pelli, and the two of them emigrated to the United States in 1952. Balmori continued her education at the University of California, Los Angeles, earning her PhD in urban history. Balmori and Pelli had two children: Denis, a neurobiologist and professor of psychology and neural science at New York University and Rafael Pelli, who went on to become a well-known architect at his father's firm, Cesar Pelli Associates. The couple resided in an apartment in the San Remo on Manhattan's Upper West Side.

== Career ==
After graduation, Balmori moved to the East Coast to begin her professional and academic work. She accepted a teaching position at the State University of New York at Oswego and held undergraduate seminars in landscape history at the Yale School of Architecture. She continued her own education in landscape architecture at Radcliffe College. Balmori subsequently joined César Pelli & Associates (later Pelli Clarke Pelli Architects), where she became a partner and founded the firm’s in-house landscape architecture department, before leaving in 1990 to establish Balmori Associates.

As principal of Balmori Associates, she led a number of projects noted for their integration of landscape and urban design. She prepared the master plan for the Abandoibarra district in Bilbao, Spain, with riverfront landscapes along the Nervión River adjacent to the Guggenheim Museum Bilbao. In 2005, her firm realized Robert Smithson’s concept for a floating island that circumnavigated Manhattan. Balmori Associates (with StudioMDA, Knippers Helbig, David Skelly, CITA, Bluegreen, John A. Martin & Associates, and Davis Langdon) was selected as one of five finalists in the ARC International Wildlife Crossing Infrastructure Design Competition for a proposed wildlife overpass on Interstate 70 near Denver, Colorado.

Beyond built work, Balmori served on advisory and policy bodies related to the designed environment, including the Allston Development Group at Harvard University, the board of the Van Alen Institute, the Lower Manhattan Development Corporation for the World Trade Center site, and the Committee for the Comprehensive Design Plan for the White House. She received recognition from national cultural agencies including the National Endowment for the Arts and the National Endowment for the Humanities, and served two terms on the U.S. Commission of Fine Arts; in 2006 she was appointed a Senior Fellow in Garden and Landscape Studies at Dumbarton Oaks in Washington, D.C. She held visiting appointments at Yale, including the Davenport Chair of Architectural Design (Spring 2004) and the William Henry Bishop Visiting Professorship (Fall 2008), and also taught in the Yale School of Forestry & Environmental Studies.

Balmori wrote on cities, the environment, and the history of design, linking practice and scholarship. Her publications include, among others, Beatrix Farrand (with Susan Tamulevich), American Landscapes: Garden and Campus Designs (1985), Redesigning the American Lawn (1993, with Andy Clayden and Michael Pollan), and Groundwork: Between Landscape and Architecture (2011, with Joel Sanders).

Between 2001 and 2004, in Argentina, Balmori Associates developed the landscape design for the campus of Universidad Siglo 21 in Córdoba, as part of a campus plan by César Pelli & Associates and in association with the local firm GGMPU; the complex was inaugurated in 2004–2005.

In 2011 she was named a Fellow of the American Society of Landscape Architects (FASLA). She died on November 14, 2016, at the age of 84.

== Style ==
Balmori's interest in landscape and urban design grew out of her interest in public space; the way it is used and designed, and its role and effect on the larger environment. Her design style is recognized by the way it creates a fluid interface between landscape and structure in the development of urban public spaces. The work explores how form can respond to a new understanding of nature – not simply as visual imitation – but contingent on an understanding of process.

She was also an innovator in sustainable systems; one aspect of this is in the area of green roofs. Balmori called the huge expanse of urban rooftops the "fifth façade."

Balmori frequently collaborated with artists and architects.

== Notable works ==
- Smithson Floating Island, New York, NY, (2005) with Robert Smithson
- Abandiobarra Masterplan, Bilbao, Spain (2012)
- Masterplan for New Government City of Sejong, South Korea (2014)
- Growonus, Brooklyn, NY, (2015)
- Battery Park City
- Ronald Reagan Washington National Airport

== Selected bibliography ==
- "Drawing and Reinventing Landscape": Wiley, (United Kingdom) 2014
- "A Landscape Manifesto": Yale University Press, (United States) 2010
- "Tra Fiume e Cittá Paesaggi, Progetti e Principi": Bollati Boringhieri, (Italy) 2009
- "Balmori": C3 Publications, (Korea) 2007
- "The Land and Natural Development (LAND) Code, Guidelines for Sustainable Land Development" co-authored with Gaboury Benoit: John Wiley and Sons Ltd. (United States) 2006
- "Mapping in The Age of Digital Media: The Yale Symposium" co-authored with M. Silver: John Wiley and Sons Ltd. (United Kingdom) 2003
- "Information Exchange: How Cities Renew, Rebuild and Remember" Interview with Joan Oakman and Paulsen Sherida: Van Alen Institute, (United States) 2003
- "Saarinen House and Garden: A Total Work of Art" co-authored with Roy Slade, and Gregory Wittkopp, photography by Balthazar Korab: Harry N. Abrams, (United States) 1995
- "Transitory Gardens, Uprooted Lives" co-authored with Margaret Morton: Yale University Press, (United States) 1995
- "Redesigning the American Lawn"A Search for Environmental Harmony co-authored with F. Herbert Bormann and GordoGeballe: Yale University Press, (United States) 1993
- "Trails for the Twenty-First Century: Planning, Design, and Management Manual for Multi-Use Trail," co-authored with Charles A. Flink, Peter Lagerwey, and Robert M.Searns, ed. Karen-Lee Ryan National Rails-to-Trails Conservancy: Island Press, (United States) 1993
- "Beatrix Farrand, American Landscapes:Garden and Campus Designs" co-authored with Diane McGuire and Eleanor McPeck: Sagapress, (United States) 1985
