= Jennifer Toth =

American journalist and writer (1967–2025)

- Born: Jennifer Ninel Toth; August 15, 1967; London, England
- Died: April 12, 2025 (aged 57); Silver Spring, Maryland, U.S.
- Education: Washington University in St. Louis; Columbia University
- Occupations: Journalist; author
- Notable work: The Mole People
- Spouse: Craig Whitlock (m. 1996)

Jennifer Ninel Toth (August 15, 1967 – April 12, 2025) was an American journalist and writer. She was known for her published studies of homeless people and orphans.

== Early life and education ==
Toth was born in London on August 15, 1967, to American parents Robert and Paula Toth. Her father was a national security correspondent for the Los Angeles Times and later a senior associate at the Pew Research Center, while her mother was a lawyer and special advocate for the state of Maryland. Toth grew up in Moscow, Russia (where her father was a reporter for three years) and Chevy Chase, Maryland.

She received her undergraduate degree in history from Washington University in St. Louis in 1989, before graduating from Columbia University with an M.A. in journalism in 1990.

== Career ==
From 1990 to 1992, Toth worked as a journalist for the Los Angeles Times in Washington, D.C. and New York, and afterwards for the Raleigh News & Observer from 1992 to 1995, after which she quit to focus on her book projects.

=== The Mole People ===
In 1993, she published The Mole People: Life in the Tunnels Beneath New York City through Chicago Review Press. The book featured interviews with some dwellers of the "Freedom Tunnel". Her life was threatened by one of the mole people whom she befriended, who thought she witnessed him killing a crack addict. She consequently fled New York City to live with her parents in Chevy Chase, Maryland. Some critics cast doubt on the accuracy of Toth's accounts. Cecil Adams' The Straight Dope, a widely read question and answer column, devoted two columns to the Mole People dispute. The first, published on January 9, 2004, after contact with Toth, noted the large amount of unverifiability in Toth's stories while declaring that the book's accounts seemed to be truthful. The second, published on March 9, 2004, after contact with Joseph Brennan, was more skeptical.

=== Writing on foster care ===
In 1997, Toth published Orphans of the Living: Stories of America's Children in Foster Care, a book narrating the life stories of five young adults from North Carolina, California, and Illinois who overcame heavy odds to survive their childhood in foster care. Publishers Weekly called it an "eloquent and harrowing study", and "an excellent expose of a system that hurts those it is charged to help".

External videos
- Booknotes interview with Toth on What Happened to Johnnie Jordan?, 12 May 2002, C-SPAN

In 2002, Toth released another narrative about a young man, What Happened to Johnnie Jordan?: The Story of a Child Turning Violent, that once again addressed foster care and juvenile services, this time in Toledo, Ohio. In its review, The New Yorker wrote: "In accounts of dysfunctional families, children are often the victims of violence; here, though, a child is both victim and perpetrator. The child in question is Johnnie Jordan, a fifteen-year-old Ohioan who brutally murdered his foster mother in 1996, hacking her to death with a hatchet and then setting her on fire. Through a series of interviews with Jordan, his foster father, and others within the child-welfare system, Toth constructs an agonizing portrait of a boy who was repeatedly abused from a very young age and repeatedly failed by the system responsible for protecting him."

== Personal life and death ==
Toth married Craig Whitlock, a journalist and national-security correspondent for The Washington Post, in 1996. From 2004 to 2010, the couple lived in Berlin, where Whitlock was stationed for work. She had one child.

Toth died from respiratory complications in Silver Spring, Maryland, on April 12, 2025, at the age of 57.

== Bibliography ==
- The Mole People: Life in the Tunnels Beneath New York City (1993) (ISBN 1-55652-190-1)
  - Spanish translation: Bajo el Asfalto (2001) (ISBN 84-8109-297-5)
- Orphans of the Living: Stories of America's Children in Foster Care (1997) (ISBN 0-684-80097-7)
- What Happened to Johnnie Jordan?: The Story of a Child Turning Violent (2002) (ISBN 0-684-85558-5)

== See also ==
- Voices in the Tunnels
