= Beneath the Neon =

Non-fiction book by Matthew O'Brien

- Author: Matthew O'Brien
- Illustrator: Danny Mollohan
- Language: English
- Subject: Homelessness
- Genre: Social sciences, history
- Publisher: Huntington Press
- Publication date: June 15, 2007
- Publication place: United States
- Media type: Paperback, eBook
- Pages: 281 pp
- ISBN: 978-0929712390

Beneath the Neon: Life and Death in the Tunnels of Las Vegas is a non-fiction account by author and journalist Matthew O'Brien, with photos by Danny Mollohan. It chronicles the author's time in subterranean Las Vegas. As he pursued a killer who hid in the tunnels, he discovered hundreds of people living underground and interviewed many of them for the book. It was released in June 2007 by Huntington Press.

== Content ==
Equipped with a flashlight, tape recorder and expandable baton, O'Brien, an editor at the time for Las Vegas CityLife, an alternative weekly newspaper, for four years explored the black-and-gray underworld of the Las Vegas flood-control system.

In 2008, National Public Radio reporter Adam Burke accompanied the author into the tunnels to meet and interview some of the homeless people documented in the book.

In September 2009, an ABC Nightline news team went into the tunnels with O'Brien as well to illustrate for viewers the stories of homeless people included in Beneath the Neon.

== Book exhibit ==
In June 2008, an exhibit based on the book was built and displayed for two months at the Contemporary Arts Collective in the Arts Factory in downtown Las Vegas.

To recreate the feeling of life in the dark tunnels, graffiti artists from the drains gathered to paint the exhibit room's walls, and a curator gathered up items from the underground world, including gravel and debris and the knit cap O’Brien wore and flashlight he carried while in the tunnels.

In describing the exhibit, CityLife art critic Jarret Keene asked, "When was the last time you attended an art exhibit based on a book?"

"Arguably the scariest nonfiction narrative about this city," Keene wrote, "Matt O’Brien's Beneath the Neon: Life and Death in the Tunnels of Las Vegas gives readers a dark and eye-opening look at what it means to exist under – and we mean literally under – the (Las Vegas) Strip."

== Reception ==
In its May 2007 review, Publishers Weekly wrote, "Continually contrasting the sparkling casinos above with the dank, cobwebbed catacombs below, the observant O'Brien writes with a noirish flair, but his compassion is also evident as he illuminates the lives of these shadowy subterranean dwellers."

The book brought international attention to the fact that homeless people were living underground in Las Vegas. "Nightline" called the revelation "a much darker side to Las Vegas." Mediabistro.com wrote, "O’Brien paints a starkly different portrait of the city than the one you get while playing the $25 table at the Bellagio."

A translated French edition was released in 2012.
