= Terry Williams (sociologist) =

Academic background
- Education: City University of New York (PhD, 1978)

Academic work
- Discipline: Sociologist

Terry Williams is an American sociologist, academic, and author whose work includes urban social policy and related fields. He founded the Harlem Writers Crew Project.

== Biography ==
Williams grew up in Mississippi, where his father owned a small afterhours club. He obtained his Bachelor of Arts degree, cum Laude, from Richmond College (City University of New York). Williams received his Ph.D. in sociology from the Graduate Center of the City University of New York. While studying there in the early 1970s, ethnography was not an integral part of the program. Williams found mentors at the University of Chicago to support his interest in ethnography and other non-quantitative research methods.

He moved to Harlem in 1979. He has been a professor at Princeton University and Professor at the New School for Social Research in New York City.

In 1995, he created the film Harlem Diary: Nine Voices of Resilience, which followed nine young African-American residents of Harlem.

== Books ==
- Williams, Terry; Kornblum, William Kornblum (1985). Growing Up Poor. New York: Macmillan Company/Lexington Books.
- Ginzberg, Eli; Williams, Terry; Dutka, Anna (1989). Does Job Training Work?. Boulder: Westview Press.
- Williams, Terry (1989). The Cocaine Kids: The Inside Story of a Teenage Drug Ring. New York: Addison-Wesley Publishers. Translations: French (1990), Japanese (1991)
- Williams, Terry; Kornblum, Williams (1994). The Uptown Kids Struggle and Hope in the Projects. New York: Grosset/Putnam. ISBN 9780399138874. Review, Publishers Weekly
- Williams, Terry (1992). Crackhouse: Notes from the End of the Line. New York: Penguin Books. Translations: French (1994)
- Williams, Terry; Milton, Trevor (2015). The Con Men: Hustling In New York City. New York: Columbia University Press.
- Williams, Terry (2016). Harlem Supers: The Social Life of a Community in Transition. New York: Palgrave Macmillan.
- Williams, Terry (2017). Teenage Suicide Notes. An Ethnography of Self-Harm. New York: Columbia University Press.
- Daynes, Sarah; Williams, Terry (2018). On Ethnography. London: Polity Press.
- Williams, Terry (2020). Le Boogie Woogie: Inside an After-Hours Club. New York: Columbia University Press.
- Williams, Terry (2020). The Vanishing Indian Upper Class: Life History of Raza Mohammed Khan. London: Anthem Press.
- Williams, Terry (2024). Life Underground: Encounters with People Below the Streets of New York. Columbia University Press.
