= Margaret Morton (photographer) =

American photographer (1948–2020)

- Born: October 16, 1948; Akron, Ohio, U.S.
- Died: June 27, 2020 (aged 71); New York City, U.S.
- Education: Kent State University; Yale University School of Art (MFA)
- Occupations: Photographer; University professor; Author
- Employer: Cooper Union
- Known for: Photographs of homeless people in New York City

Margaret Morton (Née Willis; October 16, 1948 – June 27, 2020) was an American photographer, author and professor. She was a School of Art Professor at Cooper Union. For several decades beginning in the late 1980s, Morton's body of work largely depicted communities of homeless people in New York City. She published a number of photo collections in books, usually supplemented by detailed interviews with the photos' subjects. Her work was noted for depicting human stories within communities that were both highly structured and quite temporary, often shortly before their forcible destruction by New York Cities authorities. Her success in documenting poverty in New York City has been compared to the work of Jacob Riis.

== Early life and education ==
Morton was born on October 16, 1948, in Akron, Ohio. She attended Kent State University, graduating in 1970. In 1971, Morton married Thomas Judson Morton, and the two later divorced. She then became a graduate student at The Yale University School of Art, and obtained an MFA in 1977.

== Career ==
In 1980, Morton moved to New York City and became an instructor at Cooper Union. She was promoted to tenured professor in the School of Art there in 1985. Throughout 1989, Morton walked past a large semi-permanent community of homeless people in Tompkins Square Park during her regular commute, and she became interested in the topic of homelessness in New York City. This community was the subject of many of her photographs during 1989, until it was destroyed by the New York Police Department within a year. Morton was initially interested primarily in the structures that made up the physical community, but she became increasingly interested in the people there, and when the community was broken up she remained in contact with many of the people who had lived there. Some of those people continued to be featured in her photographs as they dispersed throughout the city, forming the basis for Morton's decades-long interest in photographing and interviewing the homeless people of New York City.

An exhibit of Morton's work depicting homeless people in New York City was held at the Wave Hill garden, and led to the book 1993 Transitory Gardens, Uprooted Lives featuring photographs by Morton and text written by Diana Balmori. In 1995, Morton published her second book, called The Tunnel: The Underground Homeless of New York City. The Tunnel is a collection of photographs and stories featuring the homeless inhabitants of an abandoned train tunnel beyond the end of the West Side Line. Morton demonstrates that the community was highly structured, with strong norms of privacy, established purposes for different parts of the space, sources of income and exchange, and relationships among members of the community living in the tunnel. She also reveals how the residents used the space through interviews that supplement the photographs. The photographs were taken and the interviews conducted between 1991 and 1995, and shortly afterwards the community was evicted from the tunnel when Amtrak decided to resume using it.

In 2000, Morton published the book Fragile Dwelling, in which she returned to her prior interest in the actual physical structures that homeless people built in New York City. The book included an introduction from Alan Trachtenberg and extensive commentary by the people who built the structures and lived in them, and was described as "haunting" in Publishers Weekly.

In 2004, Morton published Glass House, which documented a community of teenaged squatters living in an abandoned glass factory on the Lower East Side of Manhattan. Morton saw the book as documenting the type of highly unusual community that was completely erased from the East Village by the process of gentrification very soon after the book's publication.

Starting in 2012, Morton began photographing the Farley Building, which was constructed in 1914 by McKim, Mead & White and was renovated starting in 2010 to make way for the Moynihan Train Hall. The resulting collection of photographs was exhibited at The Architectural League of New York.

In 2006, while traveling through Kyrgyzstan, Morton mistook a graveyard in the distance for a city, and learned that some Kyrgyz ancestral cemeteries feature elaborate buildings for the dead. She later returned to Kyrgyzstan to photograph a variety of cemeteries, focusing on the analogy between cemeteries and cities, as well as the substantial temporal and spatial variation in the appearance of Kygryz cemeteries. These photographs were published in the 2014 book Cities of the Dead: The Ancestral Cemeteries of Kyrgyzstan. The photographs from Cities of the Dead were featured in an exhibit at the Arthur A. Houghton Jr. Gallery at Cooper Union.

Morton's work from throughout her career of more than four decades was featured in dozens of exhibits, as well as in outlets including The New York Times, The Washington Post, and The Atlantic. Morton died on June 27, 2020, at her home in New York City, as a result of leukemia.

== Selected works ==
- Transitory Gardens, Uprooted Lives (1993)
- The Tunnel: The Underground Homeless of New York City (1995)
- Fragile Dwelling (2000)
- Glass House (2004)
- Cities of the Dead: The Ancestral Cemeteries of Kyrgyzstan (2014)
