= Marc Singer (documentarian) =

English documentary filmmaker

- Born: London, England
- Occupation: Documentary filmmaker

Marc Singer is an English documentary filmmaker, living in the USA. His films include Dark Days (2000).

== Early life and education ==
Singer was born and raised in London, England, and moved to Florida, United States, when he was 16. After graduating from Spanish River High School, he moved to New York City.

== Filmmaking career ==
Singer's first film Dark Days, about a homeless community living in the tunnels underneath New York City, was awarded The Freedom of Expression Award, The Cinematography Award and The Audience Award at the Sundance Film Festival of 2000. Singer spent approximately two years living alongside the tunnel residents while shooting the film, using a 16mm Bolex camera borrowed from a friend despite having no formal filmmaking training. The film was edited by Melissa Neidich. Upon its Sundance premiere, the film's subjects were housed in apartments by the New York City Housing Authority as a direct result of the publicity generated by the documentary. The soundtrack was composed by DJ Shadow. Dark Days was also awarded Best Documentary/Non-Fiction film of 2000 by the Los Angeles Film Critics Association and won the Independent Spirit Award for Best Documentary of 2000 from the Independent Filmmaker Project (IFP).

In June 2001, Singer moved to North Central Florida. Working with the Department of Environmental Protection and the Florida Geological Survey, he participated with and documented the efforts of two organizations, Global Underwater Explorers (GUE) and the Woodville Karst Plain Project. Based in High Springs, the divers of G.U.E. and the W.K.P.P. research the labyrinth of water-filled cave systems that make up the Floridan aquifer. Both organizations have pushed the outer limit of diving technology, accumulating world records in the process. The short films Singer made are now used as a tool in schools across Florida, teaching children about the importance of water protection and conservation.

Singer started shooting another film, about a platoon of Marine Corps Special Forces, but did not complete it and destroyed the footage.
