= Teun Voeten =

Dutch photojournalist and cultural anthropologist

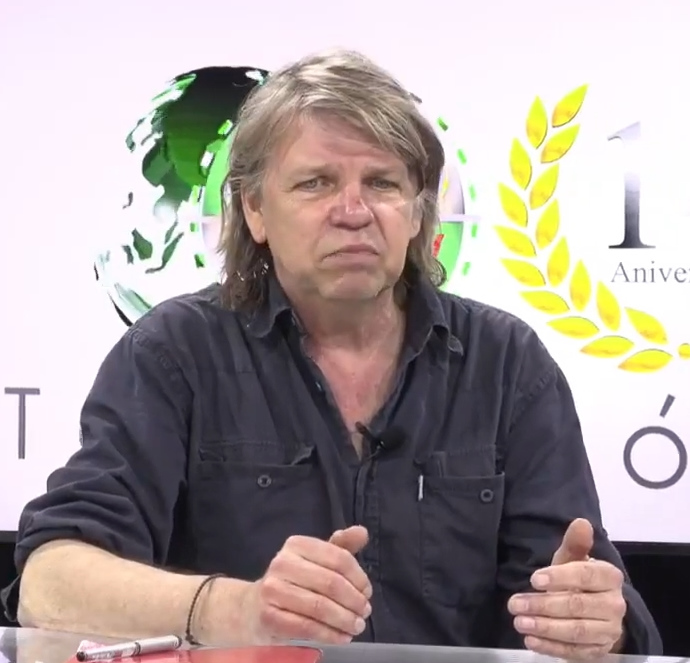
Teun Voeten in April 2021

Teun Voeten is a Dutch photojournalist and cultural anthropologist specializing in war and conflicts. In 1996 he published the book Tunnelmensen about homeless people living in an old railroad tunnel in Manhattan. He also wrote books on the war in Sierra Leone and made a photo book on drug violence in Mexico, on which subject he wrote his PhD thesis at Leiden University.

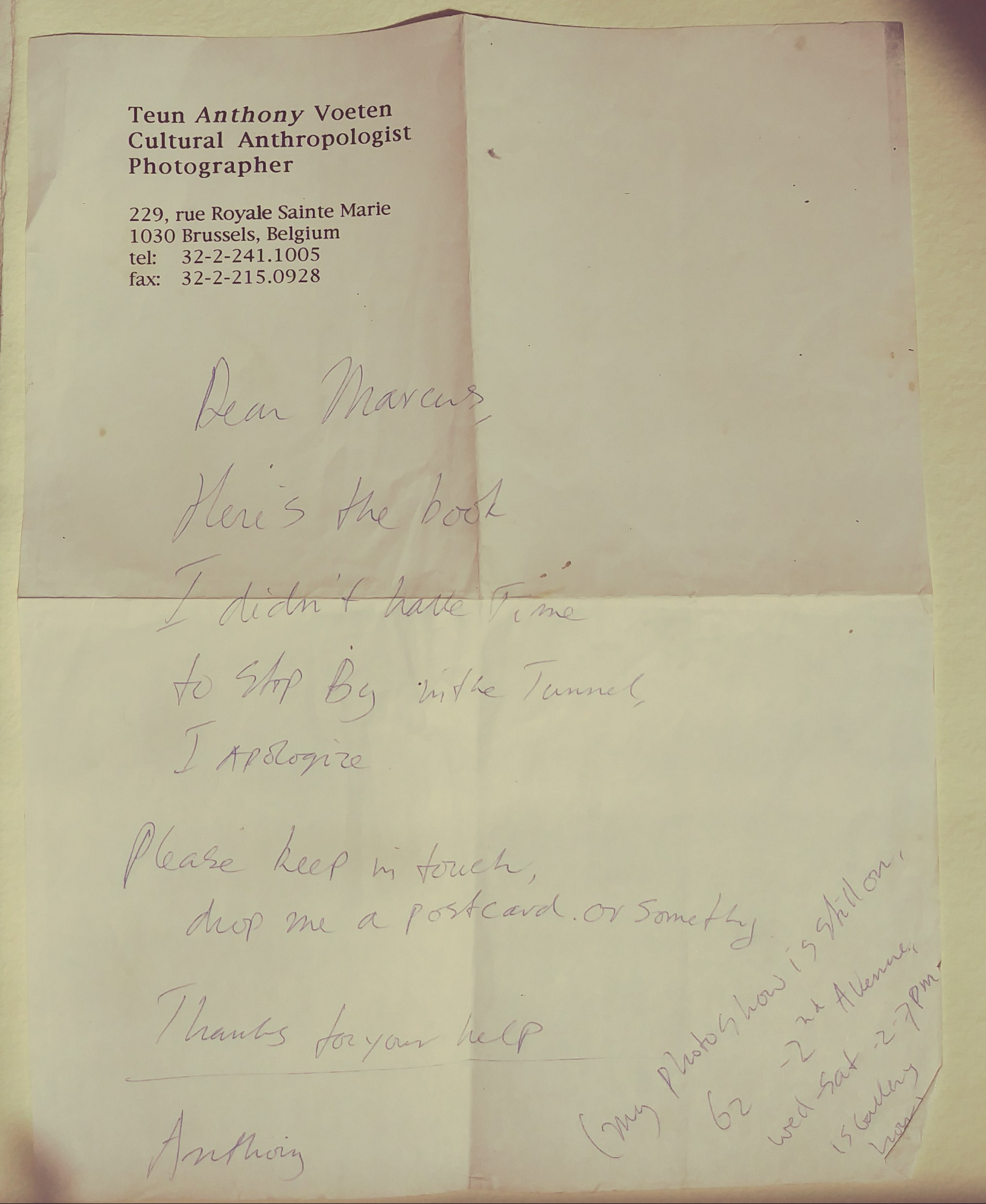
Note from Teun Voeten to Marcus, one of the tunnel dwellers he wrote about in Tunnelmensen

== Early life and education ==
Voeten was born in Boxtel, Netherlands. He started to take his first photos with a small 35mm point-and-shoot camera while spending one year as an exchange student in New Jersey. Later, during his studies in cultural anthropology and philosophy at Leiden University, he grew more interested in photography and learned the profession by assisting fashion and architectural photographers, both in the Netherlands and in New York, where he attended several courses at the School of Visual Arts in 1989. His first photo trips brought him to the industrial Ruhrgebiet in Germany, but also to the impoverished inner cities of New York, where he photographed the South Bronx and Harlem.

In New York, Voeten was accepted by the photo agency Impact Visuals and did his first assignments for magazines such as Details, EAR and High Times in which he both wrote and took photos. He researched the Provo movement in the Netherlands, covered the race riots in Bensonhurst, Brooklyn (1989), reported from the elections in Nicaragua (1990) and photographed the SCUD attacks on Tel Aviv during the first Gulf War in 1991.

Voeten obtained his master's in anthropology in 1991 after carrying out three months of fieldwork using participant observation in a remote community of gold diggers in the Andes in Ecuador.

== Career ==
After his graduation, he moved to Brussels and started to cover the unfolding civil war in Yugoslavia. In the following years, he became a full-time war correspondent, covering the conflicts in Haiti, Rwanda, Colombia, Afghanistan, Sierra Leone and Sudan for publications in the Netherlands, Belgium, Germany and the USA.

In 1998 Voeten became headline news in the Netherlands when he went missing during the civil war in Sierra Leone. The Dutch Journalist Association NVJ was ready to send a search mission of fellow journalists, when Voeten resurfaced after hiding for two weeks from rebels searching for him.

In 2000, Voeten was accepted in the London-based agency Panos Pictures, and moved to New York. Together with writer Sebastian Junger, he made several reportages for Vanity Fair about the mass killings in Kosovo, blood diamonds in Sierra Leone, the civil war in Liberia, women-trafficking on the Balkans, American army units in Afghanistan and the controversial Chinese entrepreneurs in Africa. In 2001, together with writer Andrew Cockburn, he covered the trail of conflict diamonds in Sierra Leone, DR Congo and Angola for National Geographic magazine.

Voeten arrived in Baghdad just after the American-led invasion of 2003 and photographed the immediate aftermath of the war. Six months later he returned to Iraq and was embedded with the US forces for Maclean's magazine with Canadian writer Sacha Trudeau. Over the last years, Voeten photographed the American troops in Afghanistan a few more times more. He also worked in the Gaza strip (Israeli bombardments), the DR Congo (ongoing civil war) and North Korea (daily life and socialist-realist architecture) as well as the refugee crisis in the Darfur area. He also focused on more documentary subjects such as daily life in Iran and coal mining and pollution in China. He later covered the Mexican drug war and the Arab uprisings of 2012 in Egypt and Libya. From 2014 to 2017, he also photographed in Syria and Iraq. CNN published his architectural photographs of the destruction of Sinjar.

Work from Voeten has appeared in Vanity Fair, The New Yorker, The New York Times Magazine, National Geographic, Newsweek, Time, Granta, Village Voice, Vrij Nederland, De Volkskrant, NRC, De Standaard and the Frankfurter Allgemeine Zeitung. He is also a contributor for humanitarian agencies such as International Committee of the Red Cross, Human Rights Watch, Médecins sans frontières, UNHCR and Amnesty International and other non-governmental organizations.

== Publications ==
In 1994, Voeten did an article about a community of homeless people that were living in an old rail road tunnel in Manhattan. He found this fascinating and later lived in this underground community for five months. This research and experiences were worked into the journalistic/anthropological account Tunnelmensen (1996) and, translated and revised, appeared in 2010 as Tunnel People. The work he did in Bosnia as well as from so-called forgotten wars such as Afghanistan, Colombia, Sudan and Sierra Leone appeared in the photobook A Ticket to, in 1999.

Voeten's experiences from his nearly disastrous trip to Sierra Leone appear in How de Body? Hope and Horror in Sierra Leone (Amsterdam, 2000; New York, 2002). From 2009 till 2012, Voeten documented the drug war in Mexico. His photobook Narco Estado: Drug Violence in Mexico was published in 2012.

== Exhibitions ==
Voeten has had exhibitions at Guislain Museum, Ghent; Emerging Collector Gallery, New York; Umbrage, New York; PDNB Gallery, Dallas (TX) and the Museum for Photography Rotterdam.

== Later projects ==
In 2009, Voeten started to focus on drug violence in Mexico and made numerous trips to the flashpoints of the drug war, Ciudad Juarez, Culiacan and Michoacan. He made photos and wrote articles, and also shot a video documentary for Dutch TV about growing up in the most dangerous city in the world, Ciudad Juarez.

As a guest curator of GEMAK, an exhibition space at that time affiliated with the Den Haag Fotomuseum in the Netherlands, he organized a war photography exhibition, "10 years after 9/11" that featured 30 internationally renowned photographers covering war, such as Tim Hetherington, Simon Norfolk, Teru Kuwayama, Geert van Kesteren, Mohammed Abed and Nina Berman.

Between 2012 and 2018, shocked by the cruelty in Mexico and trying to put 22 years of experience into an academic perspective, Voeten completed a PhD in anthropology at Leiden University, on extreme violence in the Mexican drug war. His thesis was titled "The Mexican Drug Violence. Hybrid Warfare, Predatory Capitalism and the Logic of Cruelty."

In 2015, Voeten started working together with Maaike Engels on the project Calais: Welcome to the Jungle, a documentary about the Calais jungle. On 15 January 2016 he was assaulted and robbed by three migrants there. The attackers carried a knife and pepper spray. Voeten uploaded a video of the event on his YouTube channel.

In 2018 and 2019 Voeten carried out social=anthropological research for the city government in Antwerp on drug related crime. He edited his final report in a Dutch language book with was published in 2020 under the title “DRUGS. Antwerpen in de de greep van de Nederlandse syndicaten". This roughly translates as "Drugs: Antwerp gripped by the Dutch Drug Syndicates".

In 2020, the updated and rewritten version of his PhD study appeared at Small Wars Journal under the title "Mexican Drug Violence. Hybrid Warfare, Predatory Capitalism and the Logic of Cruelty".

== Bibliography ==
- How the body: Hoop en horror in Sierra Leone, Amsterdam, Meulenhoff Publishers, 2000, ISBN 90-290-6514-1.
- How the body: One Man's Terrifying Journey through an African War, New York, St. Martin's Press, 2002, ISBN 0-312-28219-2.
- Tunnelmensen, Amsterdam, Atlas Publishers, 1996, ISBN 90-254-0866-4.
- Tunnel People, Oakland, CA, PM Press, 2010, ISBN 978-1-60486-070-2.
- A ticket to, Ede (NL), Leiden Art Foundation and Veenman Publishers, 1999, ISBN 90-278-1547-X.
- Narco Estado: Drug Violence in Mexico, Belgium, Lannoo Publishers, 2012, ISBN 978-94-014-0407-5.
- Het Mexicaanse drugsgeweld. Een nieuw type oorlog, roofkapitalisme en de logica van wreedheid , Netherlands, De Blauwe Tijger Publishers, 2018, ISBN 978-94-921-6164-2.
- Drugs. Antwerpen in de greep van de Nederlandse syndicaten, Uitgeverij Van Halewyck, 2020, ISBN 9789463832113.
- Mexican Drug Violence. Hybrid Warfare, Predatory Capitalism and the Logic of Cruelty, 2020, ISBN 978-1664134157.
