= Cecil Adams =

American humorist

Cecil Adams, affectionately known to readers and fans and sometimes refers to himself as Uncle Cecil or Uncle Cece, is the pseudonymous author of The Straight Dope, a popular question and answer column published in the Chicago Reader from February 2, 1973 to 2018. The true identity of Adams, whether a single individual or a group of authors, has remained secret. The Chicago Reader's 1986 trademark filing for the name "Cecil Adams" states that "Cecil Adams does not identify any particular individual but was devised as a fanciful name." As of 2008, Ed Zotti was the editor of the column. The column was syndicated in 31 newspapers in the United States and Canada and has been continued as a website. The aim of the column, and later the website, is to spread general knowledge and everyday rational thinking, using a very strong and characteristically quirky sense of humor - some of it self-deprecating.

Billed as the "World's Smartest Human", Adams responded to often unusual inquiries with a high degree of humor (often directed against the questioner, sometimes sardonically), and at times carried out exhaustive research into obscure and arcane issues, urban legends, and the like. On more than one occasion, Adams was forced to retract or modify an answer when confronted by "the Teeming Millions" (Adams' term for his readers), often claiming overwork and staff shortages. On rare occasions, Adams made appearances on the Straight Dope's Message Board. On June 27, 2018, Adams announced that the "Straight Dope" column would be ending after 45 years and over 3,400 columns. On January 13, 2023, it was announced that Adams would again be writing a column on The Straight Dope Message Board. The first column, which appeared on the same day, was titled, "Is longtermism the world’s most dangerous belief system?"

== Personal details ==
Adams states that he has "never been photographed", and while there is at least one photo captioned with his name, the image is of Ed Zotti, who fulfilled Adams's publicity engagements. Previous editors include Mike Lenehan and Dave Kehr. In his columns, Adams has revealed a few details of his purported personal life, including the existence of a Mrs. Adams (the FAQ section on his website states that chance references to "Mrs. Adams" may refer to his mother), that he has a brother-in-law, and that he has either children or dwarves as helpers. He has a brother. He is an accomplished traveler, and resides in Chicago's 47th Ward. He is also left-handed and may be balding and colorblind. He mentions having taken a class with Northwestern University English professor Bergen Evans, mentions once working as an electrician's apprentice, and a railroad machinist's helper. He also mentions attending a Catholic school. He is of Irish descent, and relaxes with Pink Floyd and Baileys.

== Published works ==
Adams has published five collections of his The Straight Dope columns:

- The Straight Dope (1984)
- More of the Straight Dope (1988)
- Return of the Straight Dope (1994)
- The Straight Dope Tells All (1998)
- Triumph of the Straight Dope (1999)

Zotti has also published a children's collection in The Straight Dope style entitled Know It All. Adams' columns are archived at the Straight Dope website. In 1996, the A&E Network briefly aired a show hosted by comedian Mike Lukas based on the column, also called The Straight Dope. Over 600 articles have been posted to the site's online archive; some of these contain multiple questions and answers. Also included with the columns are quirky illustrations. Slug Signorino was the regular illustrator for The Straight Dope for forty-two years. In his illustrations, Adams is often depicted as a large turkey wearing a mortar board or, occasionally, as a man in underwear with a paper bag over his head.
