= The Straight Dope =

Column published in the Chicago Reader

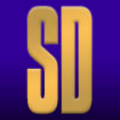
- Website type: Question and answer
- Owner: Sun-Times / Straight Dope Publishing
- Creator: Cecil Adams (pseudonym)
- Website: straightdope.com
- Commercial: Yes
- Registration: Required only on forum
- Launched: 1973; 53 years ago
- Current status: No longer updated

The Straight Dope was a question-and-answer newspaper column written under the pseudonym Cecil Adams. Contributions were made by multiple authors, and it was illustrated (also pseudonymously) by Slug Signorino. It was first published in 1973 in the Chicago Reader as well as in print syndication nationally in the United States, and on a website with the same name.

The final column was printed on June 27, 2018, including a statement that it was only being placed on hiatus, though the column has not returned.

== Name and tagline ==
The column derives its name from the American idiom meaning roughly "the true information; the full story" and covers many subjects, including history, science, old wives' tales, urban legends, and inventions. The column appeared under the tagline: "Fighting ignorance since 1973. (It's taking longer than we thought.)”

== Books ==
Five collections of columns have been published:

- The Straight Dope (1984)
- More of the Straight Dope (1988)
- Return of the Straight Dope (1994)
- The Straight Dope Tells All (1998)
- Triumph of the Straight Dope (1999)

In addition, the 1993 collection Know It All was published for younger audiences by Cecil's "assistant" Ed Zotti.

== Television ==
In 1996, the A&E Network briefly aired a show based on the column called The Straight Dope, hosted and co-written by comedian Mike Lukas. A podcast has also been released sporadically.
