= Veli Silver =

Veli Silver (born Velibor Barišič; 8 April 1983) is a Slovenian-Swiss visual artist, filmmaker, and public intervener associated with contemporary art, graffiti, and street activism.

== Early life and education ==
Veli Silver was born in Banja Luka, Yugoslavia (now Bosnia and Herzegovina). He pursued his artistic education across Europe, studying painting at the Academy of Fine Arts in Ljubljana, the Faculty of Fine Arts in Porto, and the Zurich University of the Arts.

He presented a solo project (PPP Box) at the Essl Museum in Vienna in 2007 and was awarded the OHO Young Visual Artist Award in Slovenia.

== Career ==
In 2008, Silver met Swiss artist Amos Angeles in Bucharest, Romania. The two formed the collaborative artist duo Veli & Amos. Their practice incorporates graffiti, performance art, music, painting, and video art, frequently addressing the boundaries of public space, contemporary marketing strategies, and institutional critique.

In 2011, they held the exhibition VELI AND AMOS LIVE IN GALLERIES at MMC Kibla. In 2017, they presented a prominent spatial installation titled "Space is a Canvas – Diptych" at the Museum and Galleries of Ljubljana (MGML). Subsequently, the Museum of Contemporary Art Metelkova (+MSUM) hosted the exhibition "Draught | Veli & Amos: Style Wars 2" in 2018.

== Style Wars 2 ==
In 2013, Silver and Angeles co-directed, produced, and starred in the documentary film Style Wars 2. Conceived as a thematic homage and follow-up to Tony Silver and Henry Chalfant's 1983 documentary Style Wars, the film follows the creators as they travel through Europe, the United States, and the Middle East investigating the contemporary street art scene. The documentary features appearances by various artists including Banksy, Shepard Fairey, Seen, and JonOne.

== Solo works and exhibitions ==
Outside of his collaborative practice, Silver is active as an individual contemporary artist, often exploring themes of post-vandalism, abstract expression, and urban intervention.

Since 2022, Veli Silver has worked with demolished buildings in public spaces in Zurich under the project title Kunst ab Bau.

Veli Silver's individual work was featured in the solo exhibition Not a financial advice at FOMO art space and the 2026 exhibition Under the Milky Way at the Kunstverein Hannover. The exhibition mapped the heterogeneity of post-vandalist tendencies, highlighting artists who transition street-level uprising into autonomous abstraction. In 2026, Silver participated in The Moon Jar Project exhibited at Teo Jakob in Zurich. For this project, he applied his visual language to traditional Korean ceramic vessels.
