= Subway Art =

Book about New York City Subway graffiti

- Author: Martha Cooper, Henry Chalfant
- Language: English
- Subject: Graffiti in New York City
- Genre: Photography
- Publisher: Thames & Hudson
- Publication date: 1984
- Publication place: London, England
- Pages: 100
- ISBN: 978-0805006780

Subway Art is a collaborative book by Martha Cooper and Henry Chalfant, which documents the early history of the New York City graffiti movement. Originally published in 1984, the book has been described as a "landmark photographic history".

== Development ==
Two photographers in New York City had been separately documenting the artwork seen on the subway cars for 10 years, through the 1970s and into the 1980s. Each planned to put out a book and neither could find a publisher. They agreed to work together on one book to increase the chance of finding a publisher.

They did not find one in the US mainly because graffiti was viewed as vandalism, not as art. Removal of graffiti was a problem for public agencies. The two went to the Frankfurt Book Fair, where they found their publisher, the art publisher Thames & Hudson, based in London.

== Contents ==
The book was known as 'the bible' of graffiti, because the photographs of this ephemeral art were accompanied by text describing techniques of the drawing styles and how it was done on public property without permission.

The book described the culture around graffiti, how to do it, the lingo and who did it. Cooper and Chalfant consider this as public art, a major global art movement, and do not consider it as vandalism.

Often the tags or drawings were removed the next day, so the photographs were the only record of these artistic efforts. The authors of this book often printed their images quickly to share with the graffiti artists, who did not have cameras in that decade to record the mark they left on their city, on a subway car. The police worked with the transit authority to stop this practice, even if the artists considered themselves as risking their lives to leave their mark.

These photographs were taken in an era of decline of the condition of the subway system in New York City, before David L. Gunn was brought in to lead a turnaround in 1984, including daily cleaning of rail cars.

Subway Art quickly acquired the dubious accolade of becoming one of the most stolen books in the United Kingdom, and marked the start of graffiti on London rail cars.

== Title ==
The title is a reference to the New York City Subway, where much of the city's graffiti was painted during the late 20th century, on the sides of subway cars.

This was done without permission of the transit authority and considered as vandalism in the time the two were taking pictures of the art on passing trains.

== Graffiti artists ==
The book featured the artists by name, including Zephyr, Seen, Kase2, Dondi, Lee and Lady Pink.

== Publication history ==
The book was first published in London by Thames & Hudson. It sold 500,000 copies.

The first US edition was published by Holt, Rinehart and Winston in New York, also in 1984.

=== 25th Anniversary edition ===
The 25th anniversary edition was released in 2009, with new and larger photographs included, and printed in a larger format than the first book, measuring 43x30.5 cm. It was published by Chronicle Books in San Francisco ISBN 978-0811868877.
