= Just to Get a Rep =

- Directed by: Peter Gerard
- Produced by: Peter Gerard
- Starring: Futura 2000; Mode 2 Charlie Ahearn; Afrika Bambaataa; Chaz Bojorquez; Grandmaster Caz; Henry Chalfant; Martha Cooper; Kaves; Man One; Percee-P; Blade; Comet; Zephyr; Steven Hager; Stay High 149; Tracy 168
- Music by: Cousin Cole
- Distributed by: Accidental Media
- Release date: August 22, 2004
- Running time: 52 minutes
- Countries: United Kingdom; United States
- Language: English

Just to Get a Rep is a documentary film directed by Peter Gerard. It premiered at the Edinburgh International Film Festival in 2004 and played over a dozen international film festivals. The film covers the history of graffiti art and its relationship with hip-hop, from 1970s New York City to the international graffiti culture in the early 2000s.

== Synopsis ==
The film is about the origins of graffiti and hip-hop as told by some of New York's graffiti pioneers as well as contemporary artists from Europe and the US. Graffiti art as we know it today started in Philadelphia and the Bronx and became a worldwide culture when the media and art world featured graffiti and its artists in newspapers, books and movies. Just to Get a Rep examines how these influences affected the culture and married it with rap, breakdancing and DJing under the term "hip-hop" coined by Afrika Bambaataa.

== Release ==
Just to Get a Rep was premiered at the Edinburgh International Film Festival in 2004 and played international festivals for more than two years. Just to Get a Rep was broadcast on television in France in 2007. Just to Get a Rep was released via video on demand in September 2009 from the film's website with "pay-what-you-feel" pricing and also through VODO. A DVD was released in 2010 and the film became the first available for direct-to-fan purchase on Distrify in 2011.
