= Joan Shigekawa =

American film producer

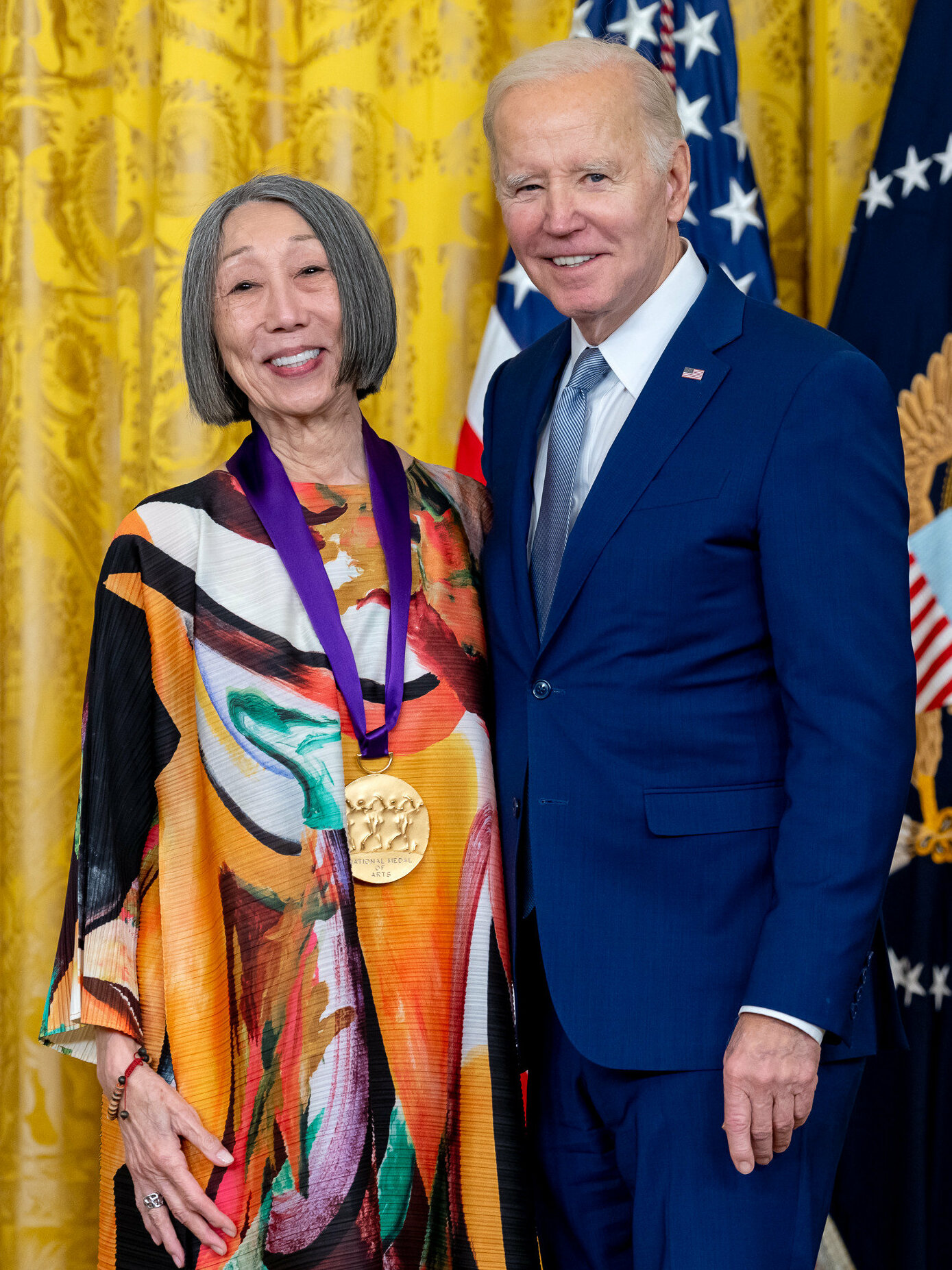
President Biden presents the 2021 National Medal of the Arts to Joan Shigekawa on March 21, 2023, at the White House

Joan Aiko Shigekawa (Japanese: 茂川 愛子, born 1936) is an American film and television producer, cultural grantmaker, and arts administrator. After a distinguished career as a senior executive at the Rockefeller Foundation, she joined the Obama administration in 2009 as senior deputy chairman of the National Endowment for the Arts (NEA) and served as the agency's acting chairman from 2012 to 2014.

== Early life and education ==
As a young child, she and her family were among the roughly 120,000 Japanese-Americans interned by the federal government during World War II. Together with her parents George and Yoshiko and her brother George Jr., she spent roughly 18 months at Tule Lake camp, just south of the Oregon border, turning 6 while in captivity.

Shikegawa recalled in an interview, “I remember that we were very cold and that my mother used to go out and try to find scraps of wood, something to keep us warm. While we were in the camp my brother got whooping cough.”

In 1958, she received a bachelor's degree from Bryn Mawr College.

== Career ==
Motivated by an interest in historical documentaries, Shigekawa moved to New York City to pursue her career. Her first job was as an assistant to CBS producer Julian Claman, who was working on cultural programming for the network.

There were few female role models in the industry at the time. As Shigekawa told the Journal of Independent Film and Video Artists in 1976, “[W]hen I started working, it never occurred to me that I could be a producer, because I would look around CBS and I didn’t see any women producers. There were women who were forty year old production assistants, and that was the kind of job I wanted to have. It didn’t occur to me that all the young men who were already production assistants were planning their careers as producers and directors….”

She gained skills and experience in a series of early jobs, including working on NBC's Today Show, at New York's public television network WNET, in theatrical production, and as a field director of admissions at Barnard College. In 1963, she helped two friends produce a low-budget documentary series about the circus, earning her first associate producer's credit.

In 1973, while working as an independent producer, she received a call from Ronnie Eldridge, who spearheaded special projects for the newly created feminist monthly publication Ms., about an hour-long special the magazine was planning for national television.

Shigekawa signed on as producer of what became Woman Alive!,a feminist documentary series made by and for women that showcased the changing role of women in society. The series, which aired on New York's public television channel WNET/13, featured individual women's stories from across the country. Presented in “magazine” format, each half-hour episode included documentaries by female filmmakers, performances by female artists and entertainers, and expert commentary from leading women such as Gloria Steinem and Lily Tomlin.

In a review on June 16, 1974, New York Times television critic Ellen Cohn described Woman Alive!as “powerful, provocative, moving, and funny.”

On October 22, 1975, New York Times critic John O’Connor wrote that Woman Alive!“achieves a most impressive level of effectiveness, scattering valuable insights and modest epiphanies with attractive care and intelligence.”

Women Alive! broadcast 10 episodes in 1975 and five more in 1977, but was unable to secure sufficient corporate funding to continue beyond its initial Corporation for Public Broadcasting Grant.

== Philanthropic leadership ==
Shigekawa was the first director of the arts program at the Nathan Cummings Foundation in New York City.

In 1985, she became the inaugural director of the international Production Laboratory at the Program for Art on Film, a partnership between the Metropolitan Museum of Art and the J. Paul Getty Trust.

From 1995 to 2009, she served as associate director of the Rockefeller Foundation, where she led the foundation's domestic and international programs in the arts, including the NYC Cultural Innovation Fund, Creativity in a Digital Age, and cultural exchanges between U.S. artists and their counterparts in Southeast Asia.

The NYC Cultural Innovation Fund was an effort to “enhance New York City’s role as a global center of creativity, culture, and diversity, and strengthen its economic and cultural vitality.” During her tenure, Shigekawa oversaw the awarding of 49 CIF grants totaling $7.8 million.

== National Endowment for the Arts ==
When Rocco Landesman became chairman of the NEA, he recruited Shigekawa to serve as senior deputy chairman, a role she held from 2009 to 2012. In October 2009, Landesman referred to his hiring of Shigekawa as “the best move I’ve made.” In 2012, when Landesman stepped down, Shigekawa became acting NEA chairman.

During her tenure, she worked closely with the Department of Defense and Kathy Roth-Douquet, CEO of the nonprofit organization Blue Star Families, to create in 2010 the Blue Star Museums program, which grants free admission to active duty military members and their families from Armed Forces Day to Labor Day. More than 2,000 museums participate across all 50 states, serving roughly 850,000 service personnel and their families each year.

Shigekawa also led efforts with the Department of Defense and Walter Reed National Military Medical Center to expand delivery of creative arts therapy and healing arts to wounded warriors with PTSD and mild brain injury.

During her tenure, the NEA worked in partnership with the Bureau of Economic Analysis for the Arts and Cultural Production Satellite Account which, for the first time, measured the contribution of arts and culture to the Gross Domestic Product (GDP).

The agency also created the Our Town funding program to promote creative placemaking in urban and rural America—work inspired by research Shigekawa had funded at the Rockefeller Foundation on the interplay between arts and community development.

== Other involvement ==
Ms. Shigekawa serves on the National Advisory Board of the Center for Asian American Media and has served as a Mayoral appointee to the New York City Cultural Affairs Advisory Commission and as a trustee of the New York Council for the Humanities, the Independent Television Service (ITVS), Grantmakers in the Arts and Grantmakers in Film and Television.

Commenting on the role of the artist in the community, Shigekawa has said,“The role of the artist in the community is the role of any other citizen in the community---to participate, to contribute, to share, and, when possible, to lead. But to all of those tasks they bring something extra: the ability to see in a different way. The ability to create music that brings people together. The ability to create movement and joy in the summer at a festival. So both their role as a citizen and then their contribution to share their creativity as best they can.”

== Personal life ==
Shigekawa's marriage to the late documentary filmmaker Tony Silver ended in divorce.

Her daughter is Dr. Mariko Silver. She has two grandchildren.
