= Rust Magic - Edmonton Mural Festival =

Rust Magic is an international street art festival in Edmonton, Alberta, held in 2016 to 2019. Trevor Peters and Annaliza Toledo were the creators of this festival of street art and helped transform Edmonton's concrete landscape into multicoloured murals that may uplift and inspire the city. Rust Magic allows graffiti artists to do professional art installations in the public view. Mentorships where offered where youth worked with artists who are commissioned for the festival's artworks. Artists worldwide have contributed not only to the Rust Magic Festival, such as Adam Fujita from Chicago and Mr.Cenz from South London, but also to the conversation on graffiti through their art pieces and speaking about its impacts at the festival.

== History ==
The festival started when Peters and Toledo travelled to Europe, and saw how street art can transform industrial cityscapes into works of art at festivals like Croatia's Grafittina Gradele. They wanted bring this type of mural art to Edmonton to provide a platform for artists to demonstrate their talents and present street art as an accessible public art form rather than vandalism.

The Festival was named Rust Magic to pay homage to the graffiti art community and the graffiti lexicon.

The Festival started in August 2016 with no money or sponsors. Business owners in Edmonton signed up to have their buildings transformed. Fourteen international artists participated in the Festival's first year. The participating artists have helped transform areas like Whyte Ave, Downtown and 124th Street with over 45 murals. Some artists have included PichiAvo, Stash, Bip and Jill Stanton, to name a few.

The founders have since relocated to Bali. Other festivals have emerged from Rust Magic's original concept, like RADO Alley and Grindstone.

=== Years active: 2016 - 2019 ===
The goal set out by the founders was to have Rust Magic run for 4 years and establish a community to carry on the spirit and legacy of the Festival. Below is a timeline of the Festival with some significant highlights.

==== 2016 ====
In the Festival's inaugural year, over 14 artists contributed to creating 15 murals in just three days. One of the keynote speakers and international artists displaying his work was Wane One, who has long-established roots in the street art world and whose work dates back to 1983.The first year was not without challenges, as organizers had to work around the city's anti-graffiti policy to ensure no one was fined and the artwork was not removed.

==== 2017 ====
Building on the success of year one, where Rust Magic was nominated for the Mayor Outstanding Contributions to the Arts award. New sponsors with funding from the Edmonton's Art Council and other local businesses that wanted to be involved. Over 25 artists signed up this year.

==== 2018 ====
This year saw the creation of the largest mural in Edmonton, located at 10331 and 106 Street, which PichiAvo created. It is 12 meters x 35 meters and its design is like a quilt and that features the Greek God Nike. Smoke from the B.C. wildfires provided an extra layer this year, with some artists talking about the conditions working in a smoky environment and how it had an effect on the work. A walking map was introduced, making it easier for Festival attendees to find the Old Strathcona Business Association-sponsored murals.

==== 2019: The Final Year ====
At the start of this year's Festival, over 45 Murals were completed. This year's edition had murals with more of a focus on letters; an example of this would be artist Slick and the tribute he created for the city's hockey town. MacEwan University hosted a keynote presentation by artists Mare139 during which an important discussion was held regarding the term graffiti over the term murals.

== Their Community Impact ==
From 2016 through 2017, due to Rust Magic, there was a spike in individuals looking for authentic-looking street art in their businesses and homes. The two founders wanted to find a way to make Edmonton walks less dull.

Part of the Organizers Trevor Peters and Annaliza Toledo's philosophy in Rust magic is to encourage young and upcoming artists. Their goal is to allow new artists to create their first murals and start building a name for themselves. Toledo expresses the benefits of the mentorship program by mentioning the importance of helping the youth build their confidence by giving them an opportunity to do their first mural and realize they can make a profession out of this work. Moreover, he emphasizes the rewarding feeling that the youth get from this experience.

The Rust Magic Festival focused on shifting the negative beliefs surrounding graffiti, as the founders hoped to provide the perspective of each artist appropriately. Rust Magic inspired business owners to open up their walls for murals, leading artists to add to an art form previously seen as vandalism. Edmonton Graffiti Artist Louden states that there is still an ambiguous line between vandalism and art. Moreover, he specifies that if the creation of the art is illegal, then it should not be considered art; rather, it is solely graffiti. He goes on to mention that if the art is done legally, then the title of that work would be appropriate. Louden concludes with his belief that the Rust Magic Festival has helped improve the landscapes of Edmonton's downtown.

Co-founder Trevor Peters believes the magic comes from the vibrant images that bring life to the cold Edmonton winters. Moreover he believes it will uplifts and bring joy to Edmonton's unique communities.

== Artists ==
Festival Year(s)	Artist Name	Artist/Mural Information	Mural Location
2016	AJA Louden, Evan Brunt and Erik Smallboy	AJA Louden, Evan Brunt and Erik Smallboy are artists who painted an owl mural on the iHuman Youth Society building for the Rust Magic Street Mural Festival. The murals consist mainly of light and dark purples and greys. The mural then got painted over a month after it was completed. Louden and his team did not know it was getting removed. The removal of the mural started a conversation for the group and those around them on the many reasons as to what murals do for a space and who they are for. Louden is an Edmontonian artist who has done work for many places in the city, and his work has now also been featured in European cities Barcelona, Florence and Prague.	9635 - 102A Avenue
2016	Nelson Dedos Garcia	Nelson Dedos Garcia is an artist who worked on a piece for the Rust Magic Festival. The artwork is in downtown Edmonton and consists of a figure in a long brown robe with long black hair, which is then overlaid by writing in orange, pink and blue.	Downtown Edmonton
2016	MAST	MAST is an artist based in New York City and made a mural for the Rust Magic Festival. The mural is on a wall of night club in downtown Edmonton and portrays figures in front of an action-packed multicoloured scene.	Downtown Edmonton
2016	Kram	Kram is an artist based in Barcelona; his mural was done on a wall of a Chinese restaurant in downtown Edmonton for the Rust Magic Festival. The art piece consists of a puma painted in grey and blue colours.	Downtown Edmonton
2016	BIP	BIP is a San Francisco-based artist, who created a mural with an image of his hand on it for the Rust Magic Festival. The artwork mainly consists of dark greys and blacks.	Downtown Edmonton
2016-2019	Wane One	The artist Wane completed a mural piece at the Dominion Hotel for the Rust Magic Festival called Wane Mural. This artwork focuses on the colours blue, green and yellow.	10324 - 82 Avenue
2017-2019	Nasarimba	Nasarimba means 'playful mischief', and it is the name of the artist duo Racheel Ziriada and Mikhail Miller. One of their art pieces is on display at Ascot properties for the Rust Magic Festival. They are based in Moh’kinstis (Calgary, Alberta) and have been working together for about 10 years. They have worked on numerous projects, including murals, solo galleries, screen prints, and sculptures.	10145 - 119 Street
2018	PichiAvo	PichiAvo, are Spanish artists who worked with the Rust Magic Festival to add to the conversation on giving a new perspective to graffiti art. They fused classical and urban art styles to create a mural for Edmonton Jefferson lofts. It is a multicoloured piece with many contrasting features.	10331 - 106 Street
2018-2019	Jill von Stanton	Jill von Stanton worked on a piece called No Beginning No End (2018), which is in Bearclaw, Edmonton, for Rust Magic. It focuses on orange and blue, with a blue floral pattern on top of an orange-striped pattern overlaying a blue diamond one. Stanton created the artwork Can and Will (2019) for the Rust Magic International Street Mural Festival in the City Cellars area of Edmonton. It is a multicoloured piece with different individual designs. She is a local Edmontonian with much experience with mural work, as she has done it for about 12 years. This art piece showcases aspects of the brewery in which it is located. Stanton specifically painted cans to reflect the environmentally friendly aspect of recyclable aluminium.	Bearclaw and 10505 - 123 Street
2019	ONEQ	ONEQ is a Japanese artist who worked with the Rust Magic Festival to create the Blue-Green Girl mural for the Silk Bar & Kitchen. Her artwork features a mix of modern pop-culture work and traditional Japanese features.	10344 - 104 Street
2019	Rath	Rath designed the Year of Pig / Rat mural for the Lucky 97 supermarket for the Rust Magic Festival. This piece focuses on yellow, grey, white and black colours.	10725 - 97 Street
2019	Adam Fujita	Adam Fujita has done two art pieces for Rust Magic. Fujita (ADAMFU) has a neon style of art, and we can see an example when looking at the Mercer Tavern art piece. The artwork Neon Duck Wall, as it is a lime green colour. Fujita created and hosted the My Life in Letters project, which he moderated for the Rust Magic x My Life in Letters panel.	Mercer Tavern and 10643 -123 Street
2019	Amuse126	Amuse126 created an art piece called Terminator at the Peter Robertson Gallery for the Rust Magic Festival. It is a modern, grey, black and white piece on the side of Peter Robertson Gallery. Amuse126 is originally from Chicago and is known as a graffiti artist.	12323 - 104 Avenue
2019	Take 5	Take 5 is an artist known for painting trains throughout North America. He is a graffiti artist who is a wheelchair user, providing his perspective on the art form. He has been a guest on Adam Fujita’s Rust Magic x My Life in Letters panel and has done a piece at the Atomic Zombie for the Rust Magic Festival.	10121 - 124 Street
2019	Kwest	Kwest is an artist and carpenter based in Toronto, and his work fuses graffiti and sculpture art. He has worked in many other countries, such as the United States and Saudi Arabia. Kwest was also a guest on Adam Fujita’s Rust Magic x My Life in Letters panel. He created a piece of artwork for the Rust Magic Festival called Kwest at Dane Company Electrical.	10823 - 82 Avenue
2019	Mega McGrath	Mega McGrath created artwork for the Rust Magic Festival called In Any Lifetime at the Yelo'd building. The artwork focuses on the colours orange, pink and white.	10152A - 82 Avenue
2019	Mr.Cenz	Mr.Cenz is an artist based in South London, UK. Mr.Cenz contributed a piece called Bonus: The Monolith for the Rust Magic Festival. The piece is a multicoloured mural that focuses on pink, purple and blue. Mr.Cenz worked 10 to 12 hours a day for 6 days to finish this mural.	9919 - 78 Avenue
2019	Slick	Slick is an artist who designed a mural spelling the word Edmonton with cartoon hands for the Rust Magic Festival. It faces MacEwan University. The art piece consists of orange, white and blue as the artist references the city's hockey team, the Edmonton Oilers.	106 Street & 103 Avenue
2019	Musa & Harrybones	Musa & Harrybones did a mural called A W A K E (2019) for the Rust Magic Festival. This art piece focuses on the colours orange, pink, yellow and white.	9928 - 81 Avenue
