= Stay High (disambiguation) =

"Habits (Stay High)" is a 2013 song by Tove Lo.

Stay High may also refer to:

- "Stay High", a remixed version by Hippie Sabotage of Tove Lo's song
- "Stay High", a song by Brittany Howard from the album Jaime
- "Stay High", a song by Juice WRLD from his album Legends Never Die
- "Stay High", a song by Mika from his album My Name Is Michael Holbrook (2019)

== See also ==
- Stay High 149 (1950–2012) graffiti artist
