= Pray (graffiti) =

Enigmatic graffiti phenomenon in 1970s-1990s New York City

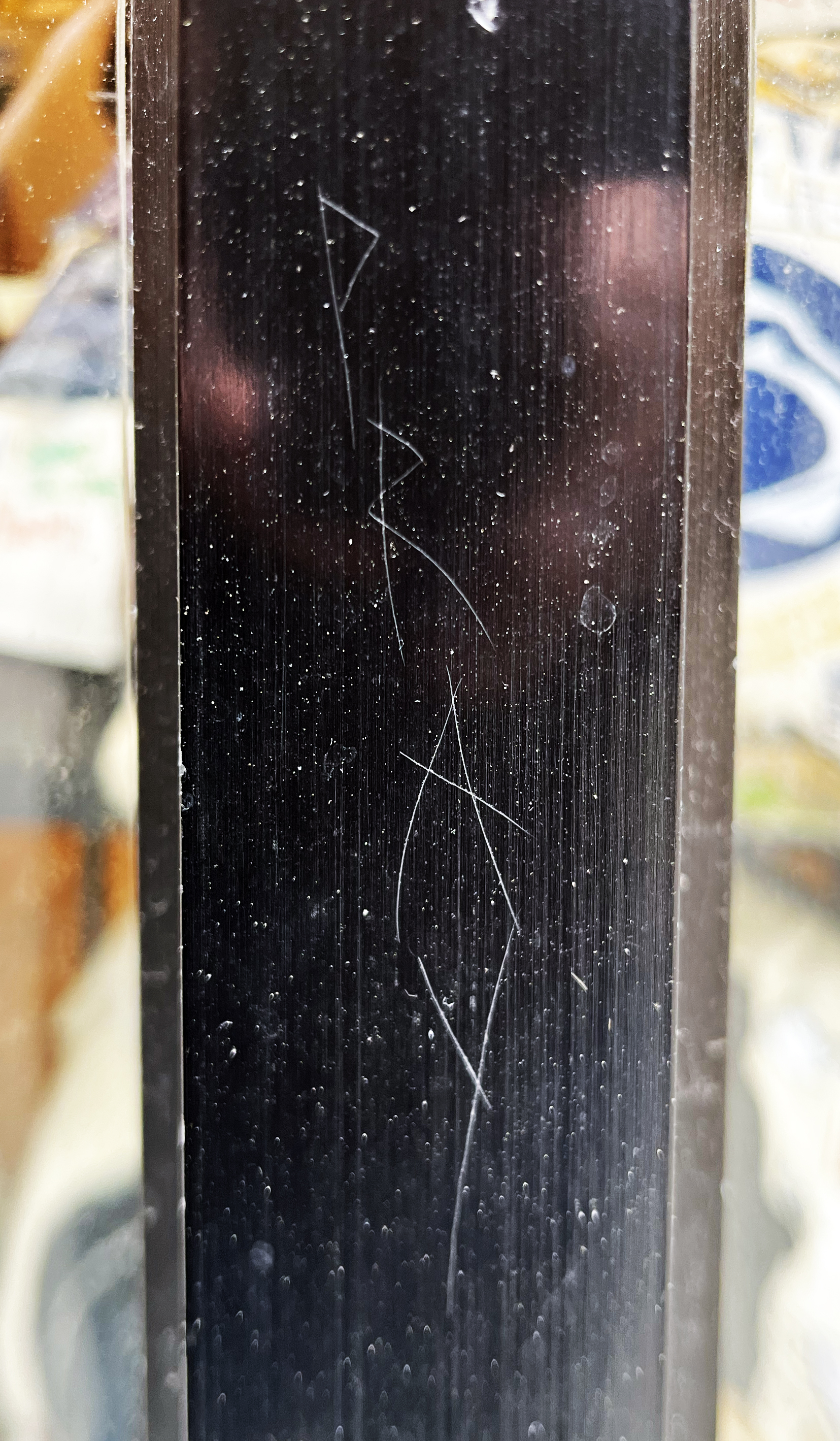
An example of an existing PRAY tag on Amsterdam Ave, NYC

PRAY is the name attributed to a prolific and anonymous graffiti tag that began appearing across New York City in the early 1970s. The graffiti typically consists of the word 'PRAY' etched into metal and glass surfaces, often in block capitals. These inscriptions were frequently accompanied by religious phrases such as 'WORSHIP GOD', 'LOVE GOD', 'TRUST GOD', and 'READ BIBLE'. The tag became a common visual element throughout the city, appearing on subway columns, payphones, doorways, and mailboxes. Despite its widespread presence, the identity of the individual or group responsible remains unconfirmed.

== Origins and early mentions ==
The earliest known media reference to graffiti consistent with the PRAY phenomenon appeared in 1973. Brooks Atkinson, a columnist for The New York Times, described religious messages written in marker on construction fences in the Kips Bay neighborhood, including phrases such as 'LOOK FOR GOD', 'GO TO CHURCH', and 'PRAY ALWAYS'. In the same year, Mitzi Cunliffe reported seeing similar messages such as 'READ HOLY BIBLE' and 'OBEY GOD' painted at the top of an escalator in a subway station.

By the mid 1970s, the graffiti had evolved into a more concise and consistent format: the single word 'PRAY' scratched into various urban surfaces. A 1978 New York Post article reported that New York Telephone executives claimed the tag had appeared on nearly all 97,000 of the company’s payphones.

== Style and technique ==
"PRAY" graffito on an emergency brake on the IND Concourse Line

The PRAY graffiti is typically inscribed by scratching into surfaces, a method that differentiates it from most spray-painted or marker-based tags. Witnesses and analysts have suggested that tools like screwdrivers, nails, or metal objects may have been used to create the etchings. Because scratched graffiti cannot be easily removed and often remains visible even under layers of paint, many PRAY tags remain extant decades later.

Some the earliest Christian art was scratched into stone, like this praying man from the 4th or 5th century AD (Milan, under the Basilica of Sant'Eustorgio)

This technique has drawn comparisons to ancient graffiti practices, with some scholars noting similarities to epigraphic traditions found in classical archaeology. The original term graffiti historically referred to scratched inscriptions, especially in archaeological contexts. The term scraffiti is a retronym coined to distinguish modern scratched graffiti from more common uses of paint or marker.

== Media coverage and academic references ==
PRAY graffiti has been analyzed in multiple scholarly and journalistic sources. Jack Stewart, an artist and researcher, included observations of PRAY in his 1989 dissertation on subway graffiti, later published as Graffiti Kings. Similarly, sociologist Craig Castleman discussed PRAY graffiti in Getting Up: Subway Graffiti in New York (1982), emphasizing its unique religious content and omnipresence. Castleman noted that some graffiti writers viewed PRAY as the most famous writer in the city at the time, citing extensive coverage in the New York Post and quoting writers who speculated on PRAY’s identity.

The graffiti also influenced the early work of artists Jean-Michel Basquiat and Al Diaz. Diaz noted that their SAMO© project initially spoofed the religious messaging typified by PRAY before developing its own tone.

In a 1989 Spy magazine article, journalist Max Cantor documented the PRAY tag's ubiquity, including a diagram showing 81 individual PRAY instances found on a single block in Manhattan. Novelist Jonathan Lethem described the tags as appearing on nearly every payphone and subway pillar across the city.

James Bennet, writing for The New York Times in 1992, reported that graffiti scholars and writers widely believed PRAY to be the original scratch-tagger in New York City. The piece includes accounts by graffiti legend TRACY 168, who said he saw PRAY—described as a small, elderly woman in black—on two occasions and watched her scratch messages while concealing her actions with a magazine.

== Cultural legacy and preservation ==
PRAY graffiti has appeared in cultural works such as the 1973 film Serpico, and the 1979 film The Warriors, where it can be seen incidentally in background scenes, and the 1984 film The Brother from Another Planet, where it plays a scripted and intentional role. Filmmaker John Sayles included a deliberate reference to PRAY as part of the plot, lending additional cultural significance to the tag.

In 2019, the "Beyond the Streets" exhibit in Brooklyn featured a reconstructed phone booth installation showcasing the PRAY tag, affirming its influence in street art history.

== Speculation and identity ==
The individual or group behind the PRAY graffiti remains unidentified. While some observers have speculated that the tag could be the work of a religious collective or even a performance art group, most graffiti writers and cultural historians believe it to be the sustained work of a single individual. A 1983 Wall Street Journal article quoted James Horris, the executive in charge of payphone operations for New York Telephone, who said that someone had been scratching 'WORSHIP GOD' on countless outdoor payphones in the city, and more recently 'PRAY' had been added to many of the enclosures. Horris stated that he was "curious" about the admonitions he believed to be the work of one vandal, adding, "There are a lot of other messages I’d feel more uncomfortable with."

Descriptions from graffiti writers and eyewitnesses consistently identify PRAY as a small, elderly woman often dressed in black. She is sometimes described as possibly homeless. In "Getting Up," graffiti writer Bama recounted having met PRAY, while writer Wicked Gary interjected with descriptive commentary. Though Gary did not claim to have seen her in this passage, his remarks corroborate aspects of Bama’s account. A 1992 New York Times article quotes TRACY 168 describing PRAY as a woman who concealed her actions behind a magazine while etching. A 1986 photograph taken by Laura Hanifin—at the behest of her friend, graffiti writer Zephyr, who was also present—is considered by many to depict the individual responsible, although this remains unconfirmed.
