= IZ the Wiz =

American painter

IZ the Wiz RTW TMB TPA
- Born: Michael Martin; November 8, 1958; Queens, New York, U.S.
- Died: June 17, 2009 (aged 50); Spring Hill, Florida, U.S.
- Known for: All-city bombing, throw-up king
- Notable work: John Lennon with Lady Pink & Mare (1980), Hell IZ for Children (1982)
- Movement: Graffiti
- Spouse: Katherine M. Lucev
- Website: http://www.izthewiz.com

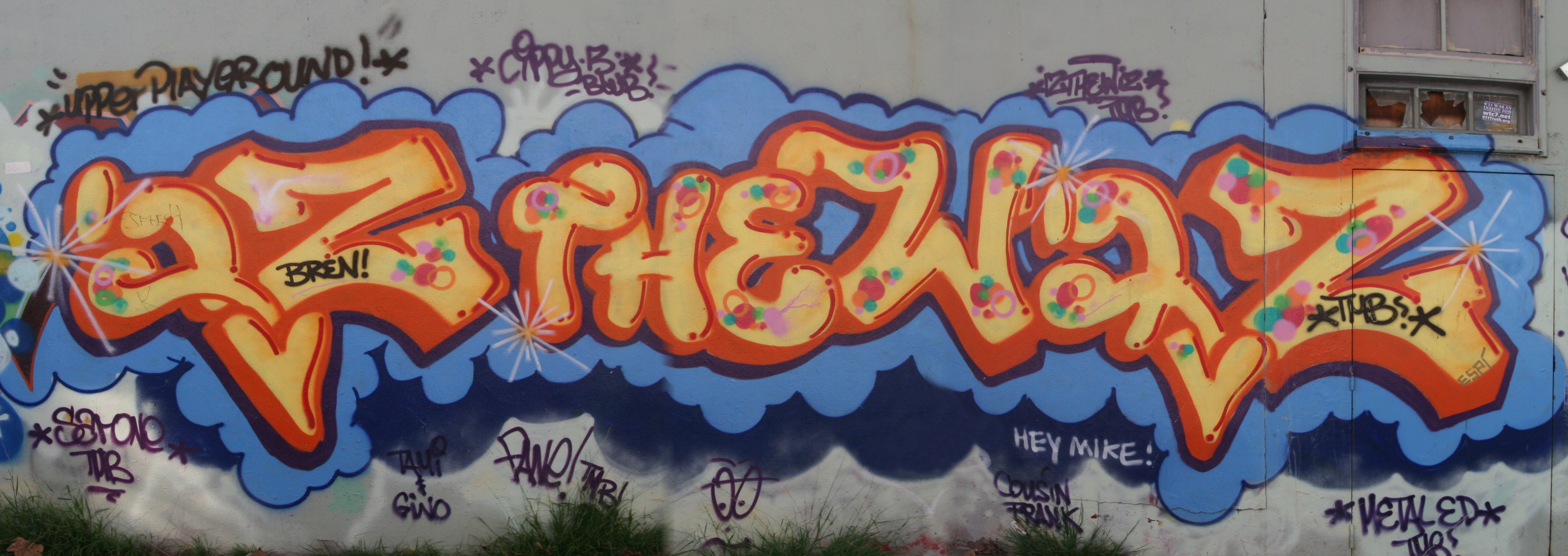
Graffiti by Iz the Wiz

Michael "IZ the Wiz" Martin (November 8, 1958 – June 17, 2009) was one of the most prominent graffiti writers of the New York graffiti movement of the late 1970s and early 1980s.

== Biography ==
Martin was from the New York City borough of Queens, a Rockaway Beach native. Beginning in 1972, he became a long reigning all-city king of New York, known primarily for his quick, simple two letter tag, 'IZ'. IZ represented a new breed of fame-obsessed writers concerned with finding the perfect balance between quantity and quality. He also wrote "CI" (for Crazy IZ), and "Ike", (short for Mike). He was a member of various crews, the most notable being TMB (The Master Blasters), RTW (Rolling Thunder Writers), and TPA (The Public Animals). He wrote graffiti on every train line in New York City. IZ THE WIZ first started writing with Evil 13 and FI 1 (aka VINNY). After going through a variety of names, including BENZ, CLICK2, and SCAT, he wrote his name Mike then dropped the first letter and chose IKE327. He began to write IZ first with VINNY. In 1976 when the movie The Wiz came out, advertising posters on the subway stations stated 'the Wiz is a Wow'. So IZ thought if the wiz is a wow why can't IZ be THE WIZ. So was born the name IZ THE WIZ.

== Personal life ==
On September 29, 1990, Martin married Katherine M. Lucev, also from the Rockaways, in St. Rose of Lima Church in Rockaway Beach, New York.

Martin was diagnosed with kidney failure in 1996 after years of using toxic aerosol products without any type of protective mask. In early 2000, in an interview for Style Wars revisited, he commented that he would give up all his past fame for full health.

== Cultural impact ==
IZ was prominently featured in the 1983 documentary Style Wars. His work, which appeared in the book Subway Art, has been credited with inspiring European graffiti in particular; Martin's piece Hell IZ for Children became influential in Europe where the use of his tag to form a sentence and his freeform style has been incorporated and adapted by contemporary graffiti artists.

In 1993 Martin founded the Phun Phactory in New York which would become the 5 Pointz art gallery. In August 2003 he self-curated a solo gallery exhibition in New York City showcasing his legal artwork.

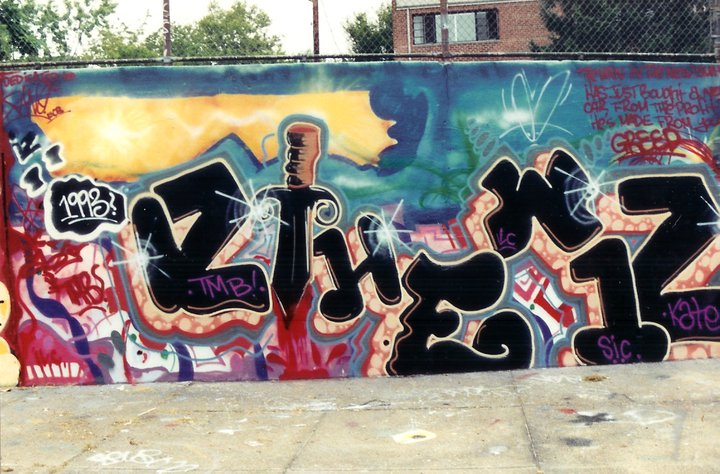
Iz the Wiz mural at the Franklin K. Lane High School, 1993

IZ had his art appear in video games such as Marc Eckō's Getting Up: Contents Under Pressure and The Warriors. His tag is also featured in the 1979 cult movie The Warriors, and his work is mentioned in Lauren Wilkinson's novel American Spy in a scene where the protagonist is walking down a NYC street covered by IZ tags.

In 2013 the artists Revok and Pose incorporated Martin's tag into a mural painted on the Bowery Wall in tribute to deceased New York graffiti artists.

== Death ==
Martin died of a heart attack on June 17, 2009, in Spring Hill, Florida.
