= Mariko Silver =

American university president and advisor

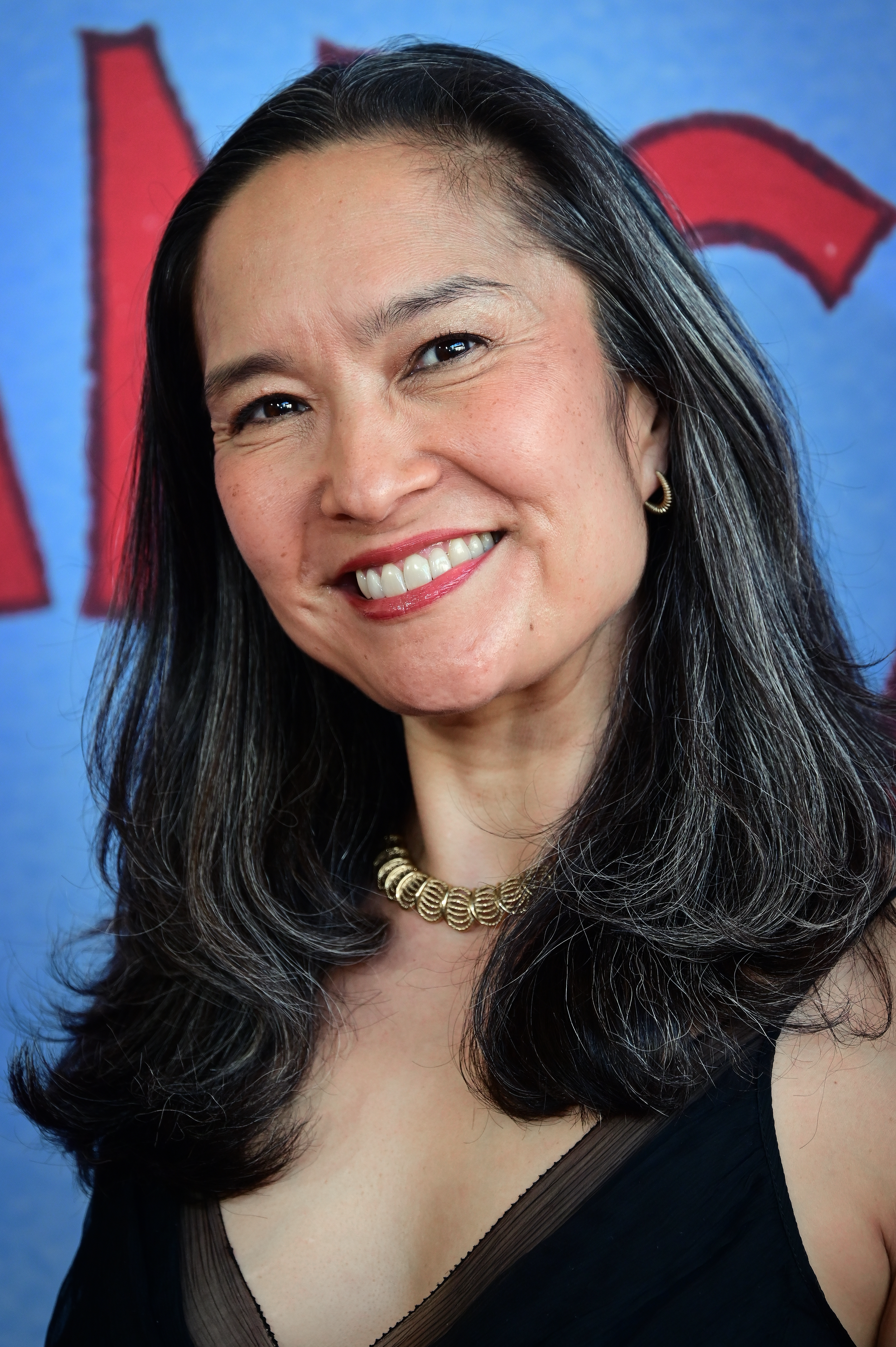
- Silver in 2026

President and CEO of Lincoln Center
- Incumbent
- Assumed office September 23, 2024
- Preceded by: Henry Timms

10th President of Bennington College
- In office July 2013 – July 2019
- Preceded by: Elizabeth Coleman
- Succeeded by: Laura R. Walker

Personal details
- Relations: Tony Silver (father); Joan Shigekawa (mother)
- Education: Yale University (BA); University of Sussex (MS); University of California, Los Angeles (PhD)

Mariko Silver has been named president and CEO of Lincoln Center for the Performing Arts, and began her term on September 23, 2024.

Silver is the former president and CEO of the Henry Luce Foundation.

== Education ==
Silver attended Yale University, where she received her BA in history in 1999. In 2001, she received her Master of Science degree in science and technology policy from the University of Sussex, and completed her Ph.D. in economic geography from the University of California, Los Angeles, in 2012. She was awarded an honorary Doctor of Humane Letters from Hofstra University in 2017.

== Career ==
Silver became president of Bennington College in July 2013. In 2014, she "led the design of a 10-year strategic plan for the college which emphasizes the education and development of the whole student, integration of curricular and co-curricular experiences, and a redesign of Bennington's signature Field Work Term in which every student must pursue a seven-week internship or work experience every year of their undergraduate studies" During her time as president she claimed that the application pool has grown and that the school had become more diverse, both economically and geographically. Since 2001 the college's enrollment has remained level.

In her previous position as a senior advisor to the president at Arizona State University, Silver was involved in what Newsweek called "one of the most radical redesigns in higher learning since the origins of the modern university", as well as leading initiatives such as an international collaboration on education design, international teaching partnerships, and more.

As Policy Advisor for Innovation, Higher Education, and Economic Development to Arizona Governor Janet Napolitano, Silver worked on statewide education policy initiatives in areas including "science and technology, innovation policy, economic development and diversification, workforce development, tertiary education, and the creation of a continuum-oriented education system".

During her time at the United States Department of Homeland Security in the Obama administration (also under Napolitano), Silver led the department's office of International Affairs. She worked on projects in international strategy, negotiation, organization, and collaboration on issues such as counter-terrorism, immigration, cyber-security, and disaster resilience.

In August 2024, the Lincoln Center announced Silver's appointment as its next president, succeeding Henry Timms.

Silver is chair of the board of trustees of the Massachusetts Museum of Contemporary Art (MASS MoCA) Foundation, and serves on the boards of Philanthropy New York, and the Migration Policy Institute.

== Personal life ==
Silver's father, Tony Silver, was a documentary filmmaker who directed Style Wars (1983). Her mother, Joan Shigekawa, was Senior Deputy Chairman at the National Endowment for the Arts.

She grew up on the Upper West Side.
