= Stay High 149 =

American graffiti artist (1950–2012)

- Born: Wayne Roberts; October 20, 1950; Emporia, Virginia, United States
- Died: June 11, 2012 (aged 61); The Bronx, New York, United States
- Occupation: Graffiti artist
- Years active: 1960s – 1974

Wayne Roberts (October 20, 1950 – June 11, 2012), known as Stay High 149, was an American graffiti artist.

== Career ==
Roberts was born in Emporia, Virginia, moving to The Bronx, New York at age six. He was called a "superstar" of the graffiti world in the late 1970s. Widely considered to use one of the most famous graffiti tags in the world, his trademark includes a smoking version of the stick figure from 1960s British television program The Saint.

Roberts collaborated with a number of well known brands during his career, including Huf, and the Burton Snowboards skate brand, Gravis.

Roberts was featured in the 2004 documentary Just to Get a Rep by Peter Gerard.

== Death ==
Roberts died on June 11, 2012, from liver disease at Calvary Hospital in The Bronx, New York.
