= Zephyr (artist) =

American graffiti artist

Zephyr TR RTW
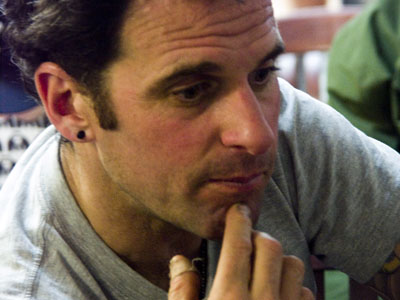
- Zephyr in 2006
- Born: Andrew Witten; United States
- Known for: Graffiti
- Notable work: Wild Style logo
- Movement: Graffiti
- Website: zephyrgraffiti.com

Tag

ZEPHYR, born Andrew Witten, is a graffiti artist, lecturer and author from New York City. He began writing graffiti in 1975 using the name "Zephyr" in 1977. He is considered a graffiti "elder", who along with Futura 2000, Blade, PHASE 2, CRASH, Lady Pink and TAKI 183 invented styles and standards which are still in use.

== Graffiti ==
Much of Zephyr's original work was graffiti applied on New York City Subway rolling stock. Witten has commented on this period of his work:

We felt we understood the trains more than the Transit Authority. Teenagers were running the system. We decided when, where, how much we wrote. Graffiti showed that the Transit Authority was not in control.

From 1977 to 1981, Zephyr was a key member of graffiti crews including The Rebels (TR) and Rolling Thunder Writers (RTW), composed largely of artists affiliated with a scene of teenagers spending time in Central Park. Witten was influenced in part by psychedelic artists and underground cartoonists such as Vaughn Bodē and Victor Moscoso but he credits Rick Griffin as his biggest influence.

Witten was part of the first wave of graffiti artists to make the transition to galleries, collectors and commercial work. In the early 80s, he showed at New York City galleries specializing in graffiti, such as the FUN Gallery and 51X. In 1984, T-shirts bearing an original Zephyr design were exhibited at the Ronald Feldman Gallery as a part of designer Willi Smith’s WilliWear Productions debut of artist designed T-shirts. The T-shirt collaboration merged art, fashion, and the commercial production of artist designed apparel. Witten's art was part of a five-man show including Fab Five Freddy, ERO (Dominique Philbert), Futura 2000 and Dondi White that toured Japan in 1983. In 2005, he was included in the "East Village USA" show held at The New Museum.

His works can be seen in the hip-hop culture documentary Style Wars and he was featured as himself in the landmark hip-hop motion picture Wild Style. He is co-author of a 2001 biography of fellow graffiti artist, Dondi White: Dondi White Style Master General: The Life of Graffiti Artist Dondi White. He is interviewed in the 2005 DIY graffiti video The Art of Storytelling, where he talks about fallen graffiti artist Nace. He was featured in the documentary Bomb It.

His name was inspired by a brand of surfboards and skateboards. Many of his most popular pieces have been done by simply redesigning his trademark name "Zeph" or "Zephyr". Sharp contrast in the edges of the letters are also featured throughout his artwork.

Witten's influence on New York City's self-image is exemplified in Suzanne Vega's 2007 song "Zephyr and I," which uses a conversation between Vega and Witten as a framing device to create what Vega describes as "sort of a little snapshot of what West End Avenue used to be like in the 70s."

Zephyr was one of the artists represented at the L'Aérosol Graffiti Museum in Paris from 2017 to 2018 for the exhibition Maquis-art Hall of Fame.

== Published works ==
- Powell, Ricky. Zephyr (illustrator). Oh Snap 2.13.61 Publications: 1996.
- Witten, Andrew; White, Michael. Dondi White Style Master General: The Life of Graffiti Artist Dondi White. Regan Books: 2001.
- Cooper, Martha; Walta, Akim; Zephyr; Ahearn, Charlie; Fabel; Astor, Patti. Hip Hop Files: Photographs 1979–1984. From Here to Fame (Powerhouse Books): 2004.
- Zephyr; Miller, Ken; Sutherland, Peter. Pedal. Powerhouse Books: 2006.

== See also ==
- Pray (graffiti)
