= Kase2 =

American graffiti artist (1958–2011)

King Kase2 TFP
- Born: Jeff Brown; December 12, 1958; Harlem, New York City
- Died: August 14, 2011 (aged 52); Lincoln Hospital, South Bronx New York City, U.S.
- Known for: "Computer rock" wildstyle
- Movement: Graffiti

Kase2 (December 12, 1958 – August 14, 2011), also known as King Kase2 and Case2; born Jeff Brown, was a graffiti writer and a significant contributor to the hip-hop movement.

== Biography ==
Jeff Brown was born in New York City. He painted his first handball court in 1973 and by 1976 had painted over fifty major pieces on subway trains in New York City. In the 1980s he popularized his "computer rock" style, a form of wildstyle where letters are broken into boxes and scrambled. He was one of the most famous members of TFP Crew (The Fantastic Partners) along with Butch2. He also wrote with TDS (The Death Squad).

The self-proclaimed King of Style, Kase was admired by other graffiti writers as having a natural flair for his art, his train pieces being creative and stylish. He was included in the original hip-hop documentary Style Wars, which won the Grand Prize for Documentaries at the 1983 Sundance Film Festival.

Kase lost his right arm in an accident while playing when he was just ten years old. Kase explained what happened to himself in 'Style Wars': "It wasn't no severely bad accident, just that I got burnt by wires, that's all... electrical wires, and then they rushed me to the hospital and they just had to amputate... 'Cause my tissues and muscles was burnt bad."

Kase died on August 14, 2011, at Lincoln Medical and Mental Health Center in the South Bronx from lung adenocarcinoma.
