= Woman Alive! =

US television show

- Genre: Variety
- Original language: English
- No. of seasons: 3
- No. of episodes: 16

Production
- Executive producers: Joan Shigekawa; Ronnie Eldridge
- Producers: Susan Lester; Candida Harper; Joan Fiore; Jacqueline Donnet; Janis Klein
- Production location: United States

Original release
- Network: WNET; KERA-TV (pilot)
- Release: 1974 – 1977

Woman Alive! was a feminist television show resulting from a collaboration between Ms. Magazine and American public television. It consisted of one pilot episode (1974) and two series (1975 and 1977).

== Background ==
In 1974, Ms. Magazine decided that it could reach an even wider audience if they produced a television program. The show was to celebrate women's empowerment by exploring a variety of subjects, including women in politics and sports, job discrimination, and gender differences. The format of the show was meant to mimic a magazine, and featured short documentaries, usually made by independent, women film makers, mixed with short commentaries by and about women, as well as entertainment features of women in the performing arts.

Ms. collaborated with Dallas' public broadcast station, KERA-TV, to create one pilot episode of Woman Alive!, and went on to collaborate with New York City's public broadcast station, Channel 13, for the following two series produced in 1975 and 1977. All iterations of the show were made possible through a grant from the Corporation for Public Funding.

== Pilot episode ==
The initial episode of Woman Alive! was a one-hour special produced in cooperation with KERA-TV Dallas in 1974. The executive producer was Joan Shigekawa with associate producers Susan Lester and Candida Harper, and field producer Joan Fiore.

The pilot episode consisted of several short documentaries, comedy sketches, interviews, and entertainment pieces, including: A short documentary about Pat and Charles Sackrey, Texas natives interviewed at their new home in Haydenville, Massachusetts about their attempt to improve their relationship; A consciousness-raising group in Des Moines, Iowa, which included Louise Noun; An interview with Gloria Steinem at the offices of Ms. Magazine; A round-table discussion amongst members of the National Black Feminist Organization, narrated by Steinem, about their historic first convention; A satirical comedy sketch by feminist comedian Lily Tomlin wherein she plays a television psychologist addressing the case of a distraught husband; and Melissa Manchester performing the songs "Home to Myself" and "O Heaven."

The pilot featured working-class women, such as Crystal Lee Jordan [Sutton], and Black women, as it tried to dispel the media representation of the women's movement as white and elitist. One leader of the National Black Feminist Organization criticized the show for marginalizing Black women. Sandra Hollin Flowers wrote that the central episodes—Massachusetts and North Carolina—did not include the “broader representation of that ‘diversity’ we were supposed to have seen.” And the NBFO segment was “totally insufficient”: “There is a great deal more relevance to NBFO … than Woman Alive! indicated.”

== 1975 series ==
In 1975, Woman Alive! moved to WNET in New York and became a realized television series with ten thirty-minute episodes. The executive producer was Ronnie Eldridge, the producer was Joan Shigekawa, the coordinating producer was Jacqueline Donnet, and the associate producer was Janis Klein.

The New York Times reviewed this series, remarking that it was not militantly feminist in nature but rather appealed to a broad audience of American women, and while the New York Times remarked that Woman Alive! was trite at times, it also praised the show for its "impressive level of effectiveness." The first episode of the 1975 series featured a short documentary called Army Wives: Change of Command, filmed by Patricia Sides at the Army base in Fort Sill, Oklahoma. The documentary explored the new consciousnesses of Army wives.

== 1977 series ==
In 1977 the show went back on the air in New York through WNET. This series consisted of five episodes, which were sixty-minutes long each. Joan Shigekawa served as both executive producer and producers, while Jacqueline Donnet was coordinating producer and Janis Klein was associate producer. This was the final series of the show, which then went off the air. In 1986, Joan Shigekawa gave the records of Woman Alive! to Schlesinger Library in Cambridge, Massachusetts.
