= Dondi (graffiti artist) =

American graffiti artist (1961–98)

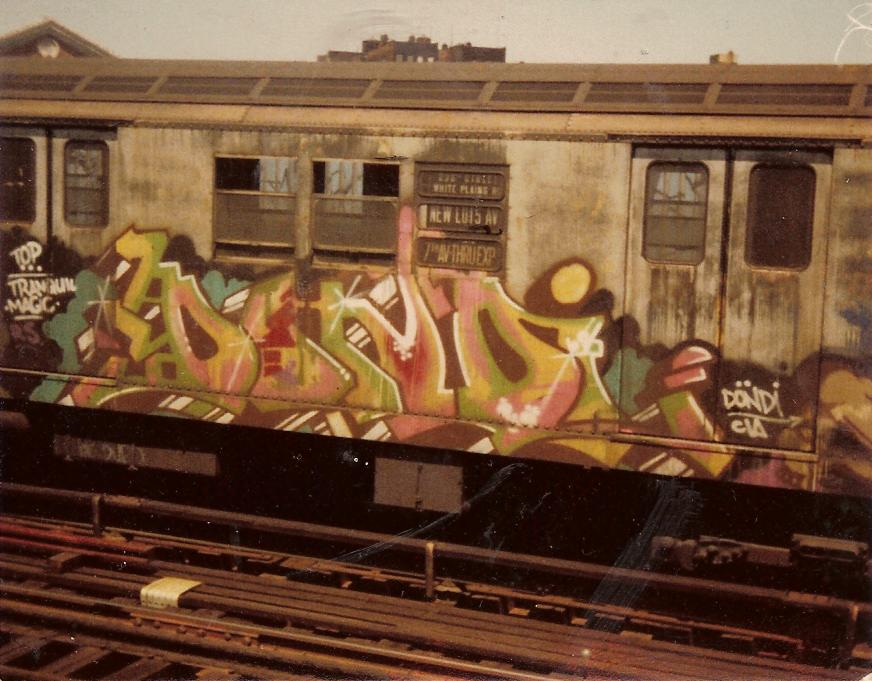
- Dondi piece on a New York City Subway R22 car.
- Born: Donald Joseph White; April 7, 1961; Brooklyn, New York, U.S.
- Died: October 2, 1998 (aged 37)
- Notable work: Children of the Grave
- Style: Graffiti, mural
- Movement: Subway Graffiti

Donald Joseph White (April 7, 1961 – October 2, 1998), known as "DONDI", was an American graffiti artist.

== Biography ==
=== Early life ===
Born in the East New York neighbourhood of Brooklyn, Dondi was the youngest of five children. He was of African American and Italian American descent. He was nicknamed "Dondi" after the comic strip of the same name. He attended a Catholic school during his sophomore year. By 1975, the East New York region became unstable with racial tensions and social conflicts, including the prominence of gangs. In an interview with Zephyr, Dondi stated that he had joined several gangs in the 1970s to avoid being attacked. Anxious to leave high school behind, he earned his GED in 1984, took a job in a government office, and began to indulge his interest in graffiti.

=== Graffiti ===
Graffiti became a serious part of Dondi's life in the mid-1970s. His first work in graffiti was as a tagger. He tagged using "NACO" and "DONDI", and worked on refining his style, gradually moving from simple tagging to building more elaborate pieces. Using his nickname as a tag was considered risky at the time because the Metropolitan Transportation Authority and the New York Police Department (NYPD) were attempting to crack down on graffiti writers. In 1979, White officially adopted his name when he painted a giant piece on the roof of his house.

He became a member of TOP crew (The Odd Partners) in 1977. In 1978, Dondi formed his own crew, named CIA (Crazy Inside Artists), which included other prominent artists such as his good friend DURO. For the next 20-odd years, Dondi became recognized as the stylistic standard, influencing generations of graffiti writers.

Dondi pioneered many of the styles and techniques still used by modern graffiti artists. Though he often created wildstyle pieces for the benefit of other writers (like the famous 2MANY piece), he wanted the public to be able to read and enjoy his work, so he focused on readable letters with intricate fills and characters.

His most famous work was Children of the Grave Parts 1, 2 and 3—three whole cars on the New York City Subway in the years 1978 through 1980. The name of the piece was taken from a Black Sabbath song. Journalist Martha Cooper filmed the final piece from start to finish. On this last piece, Dondi adopted the cartoon characters from the late Vaughn Bodē. He later painted a version of Children of the Grave 3 in a studio.

He was the first graffiti artist to have a one-man show in the Netherlands and Germany, and his work is collected by European museums.

As attested by newspapers and magazines of the early 1980s, like People magazine he worked with the Fun Gallery and together with artists of the like of Jean-Michel Basquiat, Lee Quiñones, Keith Haring, ERO (Dominique Philbert), Rammellzee, Fab 5 Freddy, Futura 2000, Toxic, Zephyr, and others, he brought Graffiti art from the streets to art galleries, and museums of the United States, Europe, and Japan.

=== Death ===
Dondi died of AIDS on October 2, 1998.

== Legacy ==
Dondi had no children, but his family, including brother Michael White and his nephew Mike White, has been moving his legacy forward. Dondi left behind hundreds of paintings and drawings, the ownership of which is still being disputed. Zephyr, IZ the Wiz, Doc, and Keo painted tribute murals between 1998 and 2000. The glass-pipe artist Marbleslinger features a Dondi stencil on a series of pieces from 2008.

Dondi was featured on a Converse shoe as part of the Product Red project (2007) as well as on a capsule clothing line by Kool Sugar Apparel that was to be available in 2016. Parts of the proceeds are going to an AIDS charity. In 2019, the Dondi White Foundation partnered with Virgil Abloh for his Off-White clothing line.

In January 2018 on an Artnet auction, a 1984 Dondi painting, titled Solid Formation, estimated between $50,000 and $70,000 USDm sold for US$240,000.

== Media ==
=== Exhibitions and appearances ===
- Martha Cooper and the Radiant children (1979)
- Esses Studio (1980)
- New York/New Wave (1981)
- Fun Gallery (1982)
- New York City Rap Tour (1982)
- Yaki Kornblit Gallery (1983)
- Fun Gallery (2) (1983)
- Museum Boijmans - Van Beuningen (1983)
- European Museum Shows (1983–85)
- 56 Bleecker Gallery (1987)
- The Rempire Show (1992)
- Groninger Museum Retrospective (1992)
- * GHOST Galerie DONDISM (Marseille; 2018)
- Musee des Monuments Francais (Paris)

=== Film ===
- Dreams Don't Die (1982)
- Style Wars (1983)
- Wild Style (1983)

== Bibliography ==
- Andrew Witten and Michael White, Dondi White Style Master General: The Life of Graffiti Artist Dondi White, New York: Regan/HarperCollins Books, 2001. ISBN 0-06-039427-7 - see Zephyr
- Dondism : Retrospective Exhibition - GHOST galerie, Marseille
