= Style Wars =

1983 American documentary film

- Directed by: Tony Silver
- Produced by: Tony Silver; Henry Chalfant
- Starring: Various
- Music by: Various
- Production company: Public Art Films
- Distributed by: PBS
- Release dates: 1983 (on television); 1984 (in theatres)
- Running time: 70 minutes 111 minutes director's cut
- Country: United States
- Language: English

Style Wars is a 1983 American documentary film on hip hop culture, directed by Tony Silver and produced in collaboration with Henry Chalfant. The film has an emphasis on graffiti, although bboying and rapping are covered to a lesser extent. The film was originally aired on the television network PBS and was subsequently shown in several film festivals to much acclaim, including the Vancouver Film Festival. It also won the Grand Jury Prize: Documentary at the Sundance Film Festival.

The documentary captures and includes many historical moments of hip hop culture during its earliest days in the 1970s onward towards the early 1980s. Many film elements from Style Wars, including outtakes, are now housed at the Academy Film Archive as part of the Tony Silver Collection.

== Background ==
The documentary explores divergent perspectives on graffiti, articulated by graffiti artists, city officials including former New York City Mayor Ed Koch, and other stakeholders such as police officers, subway maintenance personnel, and citizens. Prominent figures in the graffiti community, including artists Kase 2, Dondi, Shy 147, Seen, and Skeme along with his mother, feature prominently. The film also highlights contributions from graffiti documentarian and co-producer Henry Chalfant and breakdancer Crazy Legs of Rock Steady Crew.

While the documentary posits graffiti as a legitimate artistic expression, it concurrently portrays the vigorous efforts by municipal authorities and law enforcement to curtail this form of urban art. The administration under Mayor Koch undertook substantial measures, including the allocation of considerable funds towards anti-graffiti campaigns in subway systems, the construction of barriers at subway entry points to deter graffiti artists, and the deployment of police dogs to these locations.

The narrative extends beyond mere criminalization, presenting viewpoints from established artists who argue that the lack of accessible venues drives young artists to express themselves on public and private edifices. This demographic, often marginalized, seeks to engage with the community and articulate their identities through visible, albeit illegal, marks on urban landscapes. The documentary navigates these complex social dynamics, positioning some participants as intermediaries who recognize the artistic value while critiquing the methods of execution, thus embodying a dual role in the discourse on graffiti as both art and act of defiance.

== Reception and legacy ==
In 2009, A. O. Scott of The New York Times examined the film:

"Style Wars is a work of art in its own right too, because it doesn't just record what these artists are doing, it somehow absorbs their spirit and manages to communicate it across the decades so that we can find ourselves, so many years later, in the city, understanding what made it beautiful."

A 2018 review from The New Yorker also recommends the film, citing its soundtrack and its ability to capture the historical moment it centers on.

Pitchfork referred to the film as the "defining documentary of early hip-hop culture".

== Featured graffiti artists ==
- Demon
- Se3
- Spank
- Dez
- Skeme
- Ces 157
- MinOne (NE)
- Iz the Wiz
- Quik
- Sach
- Dondi
- Seen UA
- Seen TC5
- Dust
- Zephyr
- Revolt
- Wasp 1
- Noc 167
- Mare 139
- Kase2
- Dee 5
- Butch
- Merit
- Trap
- Duro
- Soe
- Spin
- Zone
- Kid
- Cap
- Daze
- Crash
- Paze
- Cey
- Futura
- Fred

== Featured breakers ==
- Crazy Legs
- Frosty Freeze
- Ken Swift
- Lenny Len
- Kippy Dee
- Lil' Crazy Legs
- Take One
- Ty Fly
- Mr. Freeze
- Doze
- Kid Glide
- Wavy Legs
- Kid Freeze
- Nelly Nell
- Eddie Ed
- Flip-a-matic
- Lil' Flip
- Junior Fastbreak
- Joly

== Featured music ==
- "8th Wonder" by The Sugarhill Gang
- "The Message" by Grandmaster Flash
- "Beat Bop" by Rammellzee and K-Rob
- "Pump Me Up" by Trouble Funk
- "The Wanderer" by Dion
- "Rockin' It" by The Fearless Four
- "Jam Hot" by Johnny Dynell
- "Feel The Heartbeat" by Treacherous Three

== DVD release ==
The digitally remastered DVD edition also contains:

- 23 minutes of outtake footage
- Commentary and interviews by Tony Silver and Henry Chalfant
- Interviews with Style Wars editors Victor Kanefsky and Sam Pollard
- Art galleries by Blade, Cap, Cey, Crash, Crazy Legs, Daze, Dez, Dondi, Doze, Duro, Duster, Frosty Freeze, IZ the Wiz, Case/Kase 2, Kel First, Ken Swift, Lee, Mare139, Min One, Noc 167, Paze (Erni), Lady Pink, Quik, Rammellzee, Revolt, Sach, Seen UA, Shy 147, Skeme, Rafael 666, Tracy 168, and Zephyr
- Tributes to Dondi and Shy 147
- Guest interviews with Blade, Lee, Kel First, Seen, Tracy 168, Cap, MIN (NE), QUIK, IZ the Wiz, Fab 5 Freddy, Goldie, Guru, DJ Red Alert, and photographer Martha Cooper

== 2011 restoration auction ==
On June 9, 2011 it was announced that Red Hot Chili Peppers bassist Flea along with actors Brad Pitt and James Franco and director Spike Jonze were donating items to an eBay auction that would raise money for restoring the film negatives for Style Wars. The auction ended on June 11, 2011.

== References in other media ==
DJ Mutt used quotes from the movie in his song titled "Big Lights, Big City" taken from his album Treading Water. Black Star used a clip from the movie in the intro to the song "Respiration" on the Black Star album. The Drum and Bass group Ganja Kru, composed of DJ Hype, DJ Zinc, and Pascal, used quotes from the movie in their song titled "Plague That Never Ends". Swedish band The Radio Dept. used audio samples from the film in their single "Never Follow Suit" from the album Clinging to a Scheme.

Awards
Preceded by -	Sundance Grand Jury Prize: Documentary; 1984	Succeeded by Seventeen
