= Kathy Roth-Douquet =

American businesswoman and author

- Education: Bryn Mawr College (BA) Woodrow Wilson School Princeton University (MPA) University of San Diego (JD)
- Occupation: Nonprofit executive
- Title: Founder and CEO of Blue Star Families
- Board member of: Reserve Forces Policy Board Princeton University Board of Trustees
- Awards: Daily Point of Light Award Outstanding Civilian Service Award

Kathy Roth-Douquet is founder and chief executive officer of Blue Star Families. She was the acting Principal Assistant Deputy Under Secretary of Defense at the Pentagon.

Roth-Douquet frequently speaks publicly about the role of the military in civil society and contributes to public discussions on civil military relations, military families, and national service.

== Education ==
Roth-Douquet graduated in 1986 with a B.A. from Bryn Mawr College in Pennsylvania and later earned an M.P.A. in Public Administration and International Affairs from the Woodrow Wilson School at Princeton University in 1991. She then went on to study at the University of San Diego School of Law, Magna Cum Laude and the Order of Coif where she received her J.D.

== Career ==
After attending Princeton, Roth-Douquet began working at the Nathan Cummings Foundation. In 1992, she worked as an aid to President Clinton where she was the first woman to serve as Lead Presidential Advance. She then worked with the Revlon Foundation, before taking the position of Acting Principal Assistant Deputy Under Secretary of Defense.

From 2004 until 2011, Roth-Douquet was a panel attorney at Appellate Defenders Inc. in California. In 2007 and 2008, she was an advisor to Obama for America and Veterans for Obama. In 2009, she founded Blue Star Families. She also worked at Princeton University Center for International Security Studies.

Roth-Douquet founded Blue Star Families in 2009. It is the largest national non-profit organization dedicated to the support of US military families.

In July 2023, Roth-Douquet participated in a roundtable with the House Armed Services Committee's Quality of Life Panel. The panel later issued recommendations for the National Defense Authorization Act for fiscal year 2025.

== Media and publications ==
In 2006, Roth-Douquet co-authored "AWOL: The Unexcused Absence of America’s Upper Classes from Military Service and How it Hurts Our Country" with Frank Schaeffer, as well as "How free People Move Mountains" in 2008. She has appeared on the Today Show, Fox and Friends, and PBS News Hour advocating her work on civic and military issues.

In November 2022, Roth-Douquet published an article on NBC News about the lack of funding and financial assistance for military families. She has published essays and op-eds on various other media outlets like USA Today, PBS, Foreign Policy, and The New York Times among others.

== Board membership and advisory roles ==
Roth-Douquet is a member of the Council on Foreign Relations. She also served as co-chair of the Bipartisan Policy Center’s Defense Reform Task Force and was appointed to the Reserve Forces Policy Board in 2022. She is a senior advisor for the Summit Institute, a Senior Fellow for the Truman National Security Project, a Fellow with the Inter-University Seminar on Armed Forces in Society, and also serves on the advisory board of Hope For The Warriors. In 2021, Roth-Douquet was elected as member of the board of trustees at Princeton University.

She is also a member of the advisory board of the Export-Import Bank of America and the America250.

== Awards and honors ==
Roth-Douquet is also a recipient of President George H. W. Bush's Daily Point of Light Award, and the Outstanding Civilian Service Award. In August 2021, Roth-Douquet was the inaugural selection to be inducted into the National Football League Hall. Roth-Douquet received the Navy’s Distinguished Public Service Award in 2024. Additionally, she was recognized by the Ellis Island Honor Society, which added her to its board. Further recognitions include the Secretary of Defense Medal for Outstanding Public Service for her work on defense reform.

== Personal life ==
Kathy Roth-Douquet is a military spouse to her veteran husband, Greg Douquet, co-founder of Red Duke Strategies LLC and former U.S. Marine Corps colonel. Together they have two children. While her husband was posted abroad with the US Marine Corps Forces Europe, Kathy lived with her family in Stuttgart, where her daughter Sophie wrote a column for USA Today.
