= Tony Silver =

American documentary filmmaker (1935–2008)

- Born: David Anthony Silver; April 15, 1935; Manhattan, New York, U.S.
- Died: February 1, 2008 (aged 72); Los Angeles, California, U.S.
- Education: Columbia University
- Occupation: Documentary Filmmaker
- Spouse: Joan Shigekawa (divorced)
- Children: Mariko Silver

David Anthony Silver (April 15, 1935 – February 1, 2008) was an American documentary filmmaker known for directing the film Style Wars.

== Biography ==
Silver born David Anthony Silver in Manhattan on April 15, 1935. He attended Columbia University as a Ford Foundation scholar. He was a maker of trailers and other promotional materials for movies and television, including a trailer for Oliver Stone's Platoon, which won a Clio Award in 1986. He directed the 1983 documentary Style Wars, one of the earliest accounts of hip-hop culture that documented the lives of subway graffiti artists in New York City during the early 1980s. The movie won the Grand Jury Prize at the United States Film and Video Festival, a precursor to the Sundance Film Festival.

Silver also made the documentary Marshall Arisman: Facing the Audience, about the artist Marshall Arisman.

Silver died at his home in Los Angeles on February 1, 2008. He married film producer and later acting chairman of the National Endowment for the Arts Joan Shigekawa. Their daughter is Mariko Silver, former president of Bennington College and CEO of the Henry Luce Foundation.
