= Mare139 =

American graffiti artist

Mare 139
- Born: Carlos Rodriguez; 1965 (age 60–61); Spanish Harlem, New York City
- Style: Graffiti
- Children: 1 (with Drena De Niro)

Carlos Rodriguez (born in 1965 in Spanish Harlem, New York City), better known as Mare139, is a New York-based artist. He was best known as the subway graffiti writer Mare 139, and has since adapted the graffiti lettering styles to metal sculpture in the fine art context, and is recognized as a media artist for his creation of graffiti-art-related websites.

== Work ==
As a member of the golden age of subway graffiti (1975–1985), he painted under the moniker "Mare" which was short for "Nightmare". He wrote alongside many of the style masters of his generation among them Kel First, Dondi White, Crash, Kase2, Noc167 and others. This tutelage along with his interest in modernizing the art form lead his interests to contemporary art as a vehicle to reinterpret the concepts and aesthetic of style writing.

As a sculptor, Carlos Mare139 Rodriguez's breakthrough was with the metal "K" sculpture in 1985. This led to a series of large-scale sculptures that were true to graffiti lettering format, but peeled and folded into space. By 1986, the sculptures departed from the common vernacular of writing to the more complex study Constructivist, Cubist and Futurist ideas, but yet retained its initial feel of graffiti-style writing.

His sculptures have been exhibited internationally.

Rodriguez also designed and created the award for the annual BET Awards show, which is given to entertainers, athletes and actors. Recipients include Denzel Washington, Halle Berry, Jay-Z, Snoop Dogg, Beyoncé, Kobe Bryant, Usher, Serena Williams and many more.

Other award projects included the 2005 and 2007 Red Bull Beat Battle Award and more recently the SPY Award for the 30th Anniversary of the Rock Steady Crew as well as a G-Unit Award expressly for 50 Cent given to him by fashion designer Marc Ecko.

In 2008, he completed a residency project titled "FreeStyle Archityper" at Brighton University in England, where he created an indoor sculpture installation using a process devoid of models and drawings. The on-site exhibition included other works in both metal print and large-scale sculpture. The Freestyle Archityper installation was a breakthrough work in which his interest in re-skinning architecture continued to take form. In 2009, Rodriguez will re-skin his first building using his unique sculptural talents.

Works of Rodriguez (as "Mare 139") were included in the 2010 "Art in the Streets" exhibition of graffiti and street art at MOCA in Los Angeles.

In 2017 he held the solo Breaking Abstractions exhibit at the Artgang Gallery in Montreal, Quebec, Canada.

He is a member of the Cornell Hip Hop Collection Advisory Board.

Rodriquez also lectures and writes about the evolution and history of urban art in New York City, where he lives.

== Awards ==
Aside from his fine arts accomplishments, he earned the prestigious 2006 Webby Award for his launch of the Hip Hop documentary Style Wars website. Style Wars has also garnered the COMMARTS/Communication Arts Award, Horizon Interactive Award, as well as SXSW/South by Southwest Interactive for its uniques design, narrative and interactivity.

== Recent work ==
In 2006 and 2007, Rodriguez worked with actor Robert De Niro on the film The Good Shepherd as a documenter for the making of the movie and as member of De Niro's editing team.

The writing of Rodriguez has been published in Martha Coopers photo book Street Play that documents the imaginative ʻplayʼ of children in the streets of New York in the late 1970s. His writings capture the creative play and dangers of his youth in the South Bronx.

== Personal life ==
In July 2023, Rodriguez's son Leandro with Drena De Niro died at age of 19.
