= Blue Star Families =

Nonprofit organization focused on U.S. military families

- Formation: 2009
- Founder: Kathy Roth-Douquet
- Founded at: Encinitas, California
- Type: 501(c)(3) nonprofit organization
- Purpose: Community-building, support of military families, national initiatives
- Region served: United States
- Website: https://bluestarfam.org/

Blue Star Families (BSF) is a US-based nonprofit 501(c)(3) organization co-founded by Kathy Roth-Douquet in 2009 to support and improve the quality of life of military and veteran families. The organization connects military families with civilian communities to foster mutual support.

== History ==
Blue Star Families was launched in 2009 by Kathy Roth-Douquet seeking to address the challenges of military family life through community-building and data-driven advocacy. Later that year, the organization received its nonprofit status. It introduced its first national initiative, Books on Bases, Smiles on Faces, a literacy program for children of military families at Fort Bragg, North Carolina.

In 2010, the organization partnered with the National Endowment for the Arts to launch the Blue Star Museums program, offering free summer admission to museums nationwide for active-duty service members, including National Guard and Reservists, and up to five members of their family.

Between 2011 and 2013, Blue Star Families introduced several new programs, including Operation Honor Cards, a national volunteerism campaign recognizing service members and their families, and Everyone Serves, a digital handbook designed to support military families through deployment and reintegration. Developed in collaboration with the American Red Cross and ServiceNation, Operation Honor Cards encourages civilians and military communities alike to pledge acts of service in honor of those who serve.

In 2012, the organization launched Blue Star Theatres in partnership with the Theatre Communications Group, recognized by First Lady Michelle Obama and Senator Jack Reed for its support of military families.

BSF also began publishing its annual Military Family Lifestyle Survey (MFLS) in 2009, which became a collaborative research effort with Syracuse University’s Institute for Veterans and Military Families in 2014.

During the mid-2010s, Blue Star Families expanded its programming with initiatives such as Blue Star Cares, Networks Live!, and SpouseForce, which offered online caregiver training and professional development opportunities for military spouses in technology and remote work.

In 2017, BSF launched the Serving, Thriving, and Reading Together (START) program, in partnership with the National Endowment for the Humanities, to promote family literacy and connection.

In 2023, it joined Hiring Our Heroes (HOH) to launch the 4+1 Commitment: The Formula for Military Spouse Success, a national effort to reduce the military spouse unemployment rate, with remarks delivered by First Lady Jill Biden.

By April 2025, BSF had launched its 13th chapter in the Greater Fayetteville Region of North Carolina, serving more than 240,000 local military members and families.

On August 3, 2026, Blue Star Families appointed retired U.S. Air Force Lieutenant General Charles L. Plummer as its first president, with responsibility for organizational strategy and growth.

== Programs and initiatives ==
=== Blue Star Museums ===
Launched in 2010, this national program offers free admission to more than 2,000 museums across the United States for active-duty military families during the summer months. The initiative is a collaboration between Blue Star Families and the National Endowment for the Arts.

=== Military Family Lifestyle Survey (MFLS) ===
Conducted annually since 2009, the MFLS is one of the largest and most comprehensive studies of military family well-being. The survey captures data on topics such as employment, mental health, financial security, and sense of belonging.

In 2024, more than 5,500 worldwide participants revealed the ongoing concerns about military spouse unemployment and access to mental health care.

=== Support Circles ===
BSF launched Support Circles to combat stigma surrounding mental health and suicide prevention within the veteran community. The initiative connects participants with peer networks and professional resources to reduce crisis risk and enhance resilience.

At the 39th Nashville/Midsouth Emmy Awards, "Combat the Silence", BSF's suicide prevention public service announcement campaign, received a Nashville/Midsouth Emmy Award in the Public Service Announcement Campaign category. The credited production team included Ryan Callahan, BSF's Executive Vice President of Digital Marketing and Innovation, and Vicky Perkins, BSF's Vice President of Programs, as executive producers.

=== Blue Star Cares and SpouseForce ===
Through caregiver training and career readiness programs, BSF supports military spouses and family members seeking professional development in portable career fields, including Salesforce certification and online entrepreneurship.

=== Blue Star Welcome Week ===
Blue Star Welcome Week is an annual event that focuses on supporting the families of more than 600,000 active-duty service members and veterans who relocate to a new community each year. The National Week of Activation has been designed to ensure military families feel welcome, while also inspiring community members to contribute to their support. The affected families are offered a range of options, including river cruises, farm tours, and various activities. In addition, food kits are provided to families to assist them in reducing expenditure after relocating to a new city.

== Research and policy impact ==
Blue Star Families’ annual Military Family Lifestyle Survey and related research reports have shaped national policy conversations on military readiness and family well-being.

The 2021 report Understanding the Diverse Experiences of Military & Veteran Families of Color highlighted systemic barriers and inequities faced by military families of color, influencing Department of Veterans Affairs outreach efforts and congressional hearings on military family equity.

BSF also develops annual policy priorities that focus on issues such as employment, childcare, health equity, and military spouse licensure reform.

=== Recognition ===
The organization has been recognized by the White House, the Department of Defense, and major philanthropic foundations for its impact on military family policy and community development.

== Funding ==
Blue Star Families is funded primarily through philanthropic grants, donations, and corporate partnerships.

In 2022, BSF received a $10 million donation from Amazon co-founder and billionaire MacKenzie Scott. Blue Star Families declared that they view the donation as a “challenge grant” to achieve their goal of expanding to all 50 states and supporting more military families.

In 2024, Craig Newmark Philanthropies pledged $25 million to expand BSF's chapter network. Other partners include the U.S. Chamber of Commerce Foundation's Hiring Our Heroes program, the Rosalynn Carter Institute for Caregivers, and the National Endowment for the Arts.
