= Seen (artist) =

American graffiti artist

Godfather of Graffiti Seen UA
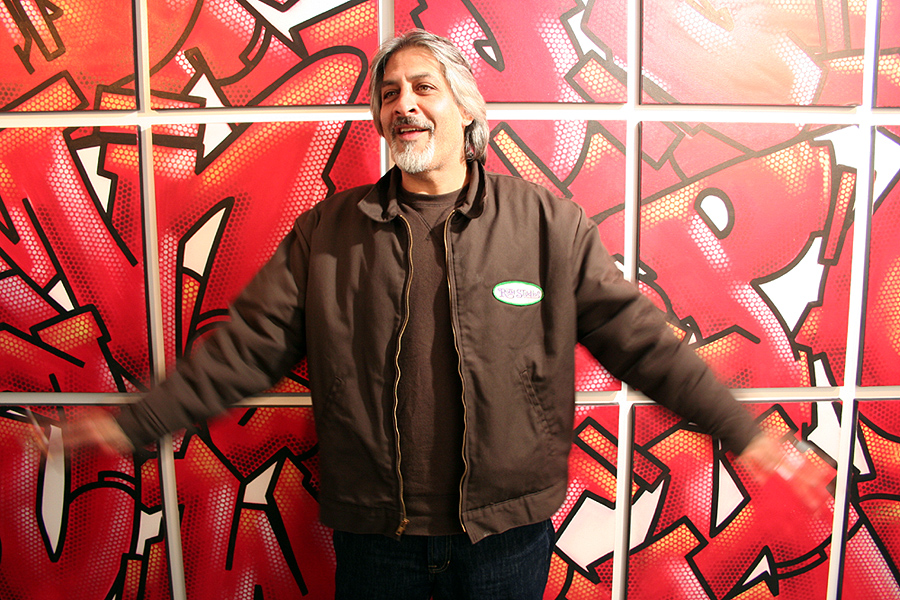
- Seen at the SEEN CITY exhibition in Paris, 2007
- Born: Richard Mirando; Bronx, New York, U.S.
- Style: Wildstyle
- Movement: Graffiti
- Website: graffitiloser.com

Richard Mirando, known as Seen, is an American graffiti artist. He is one of the best known graffiti artists in the world and has been referred to as the Godfather of Graffiti.

Seen first started to paint on the New York City Subway system in 1973.

He was born in the Bronx, New York City.

== Life ==
For the next 16 years he painted pieces across the city and on all subway routes, but they were especially prominent on the 2, 5, and 6 trains. He was responsible for dozens of whole-car top-to-bottoms, many of which have become iconic images of the time.

During the very early 1980s he started producing work on canvas, shown by galleries and bought by museums and private collectors. He continued to paint New York City subway trains until 1989, long after increased pressure from the MTA had stopped many from doing so. He was included in the 1983 PBS documentary Style Wars.

In the late 1980s he also undertook tattoo art, opening Tattoo Seen, a tattoo parlor which became one of the most successful studios in New York City. His more recent work includes three-dimensional sculpture, mixed media work with reclaimed or discarded materials (often found in the street), and a series of hand-painted MTA New York subway maps. He continues to exhibit worldwide and produce work with and alongside artists such as Banksy.

In 2008, he collaborated with influential female graffiti artist, DJ Lady Tribe. In 2009, the Seen Gallery opened in Paris before becoming the Seen Studios, France.

He has focused on painting comic book heroes. He has his own clothing line that prints t-shirts with his lettering and comic hero renderings.

In 2013, Seen was featured in Style Wars 2, a documentary directed by artists Veli Silver and Amos Angeles. Created as a homage to the 1983 classic Style Wars, the film tracks the directors across Europe, the United States, and the Middle East as they investigate the modern street art scene and its commercialization.

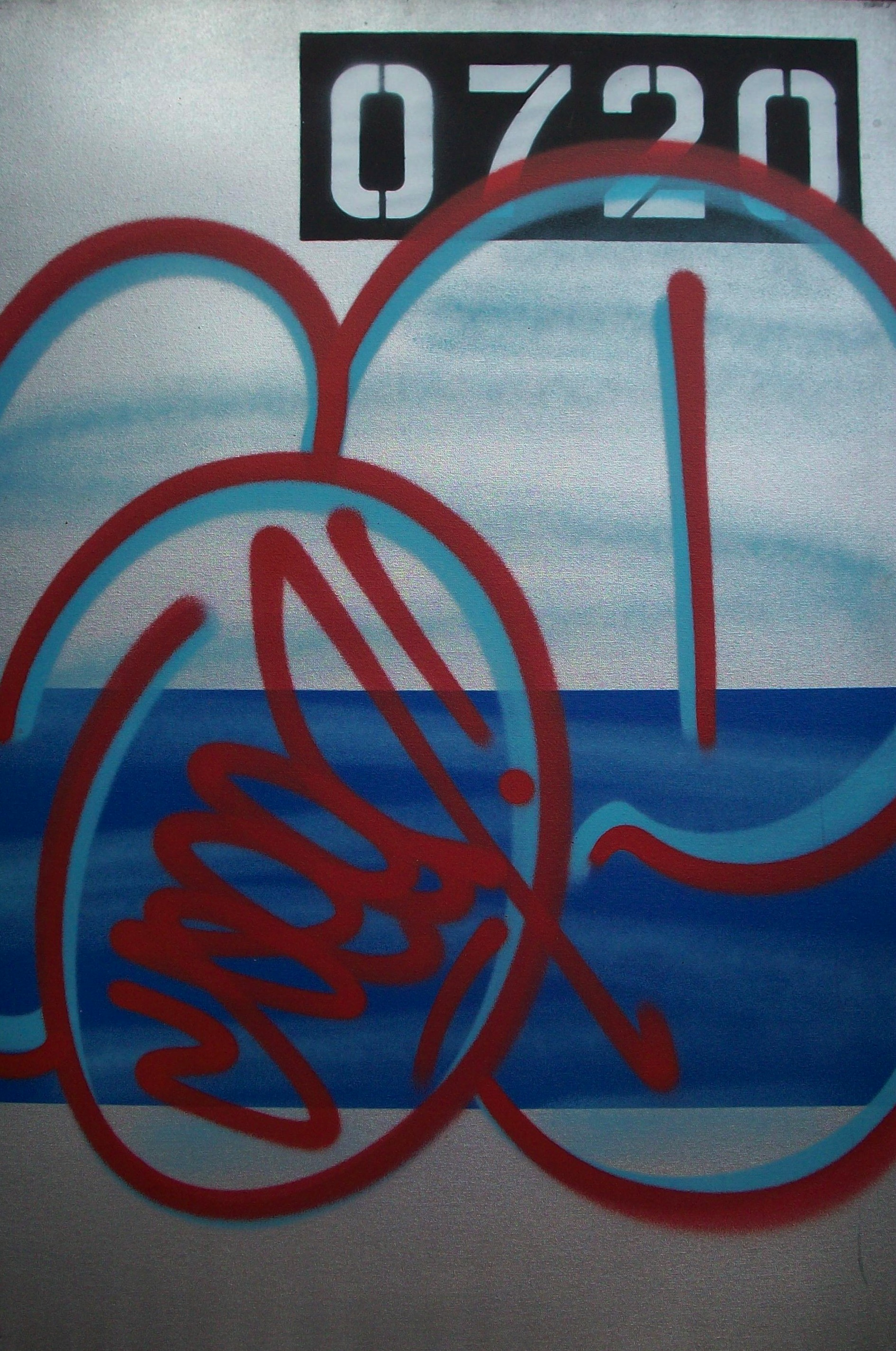

== Exhibitions ==
=== Solo shows ===
- 1982, 1983, 1985 : The Yaki Kornblitt Gallery, Amsterdam
- 1983 : Stellweg-Seguy gallery, New York City
- 1985 : Suntory company, Tokyo
- 1995 : Clayton Gallery, New York City
- 2001 : Twenty-four Gallery, Vancouver. Bob's Gallery, New York City
- 2003 : Toy Tokyo Gallery, New York City. STIP Gallery, Amsterdam. Stussy SF Gallery, San Francisco. Concrete Vibes Gallery, New York City. Marco Art Gallery, New York City
- 2005 : Rocket World Gallery, San Francisco. Outside Institute Space, Londres. Prosper Gallery, Tokyo. Mc Caigwelles Gallery, New York City
- 2006 : Stolen Space gallery, London
- 2007 : Seen City, Galerie Chappe, Paris
- 2009 : The 1st SEEN Pop-Up Show, Lyon
- 2009 : Carhartt Gallery, Weil am Rhein
- 2009 : Kleerup Gallery, Stockholm
- 2010 : PleaSE ENjoy @ Magda Danysz Gallery, Paris
- 2011 : Seen, Opera Gallery, Paris

== Bibliography ==
- Mirando, Richard (2014). They call me the godfather of graffiti Chapter 1973-1981. NYC: SEEN Studios / SDLB Publishing. ISBN 979-10-90020-01-6.
