= Peter Gerard =

American film director

- Born: Columbia, Missouri

Peter Gerard (born in Columbia, Missouri, United States) is an American film director, film producer and film distributor. Gerard founded Accidental Media and Distrify, and is currently employed at Vimeo.

== Filmmaking ==
Gerard's best known film is Just to Get a Rep - a documentary about the history of graffiti art and its relationship with hip hop. Just to Get a Rep premiered at the Edinburgh International Film Festival in 2004 and was first broadcast on television in 2007. After broadcasts in France, Australia and Russia and a limited DVD release in Japan, Just to Get a Rep was released via video on demand (VOD) in September 2009 from the film's website. The Special Edition DVD was released in March 2010, also from the film's website.

In 2009, Gerard produced The Shutdown - a short documentary directed by Adam Stafford from the band Y'all Is Fantasy Island, and written by Scottish author Alan Bissett. The Shutdown premiered at Silverdocs and the Edinburgh International Film Festival and went on to win the Jim Poole Scottish Short Film Award, Best Short Documentary at the San Francisco International Film Festival and be nominated for a BAFTA Scotland Award. In the same year, Gerard produced Fistful of Roses – a documentary directed by Leo Bruges – which won the 2010 BAFTA Scotland New Talent Award for Best Factual. In 2010, Gerard directed the short documentary Motion/Static and made a version called Tomorrow's Fairground for broadcast on the BBC.

Gerard's film career began in 2000, with his first documentary Out of Breath (co-directed by Aaron Davis and Peter Gerard), which won the Audience Award at SOFA Film Festival in Portland, Oregon. From 2000 to 2001, Gerard and Davis organised the Bargain Basement Film Festival in Columbia, Missouri.

== Online video distribution ==
In 2010, Gerard founded Distrify, an online video service that let film producers and distributors sell movies using online film trailers. The Distrify player could be embedded on any website and always contained an e-commerce shop that could sell VOD, downloads, DVDs, and merchandise as well as list cinema listings. Distrify received start-up funding from Creative Scotland and additional funding from the EU MEDIA Programme. In November 2012, the company signed a deal with Swedish film company Story AB. In October 2012, the distributors of Led Zeppelin's concert film Celebration Day used Distrify to allow fans to express interest in having a showing near them. Gerard was the CEO of Distrify until May 2014.

The Guardian Culture Professionals Network and The Hospital Club named Peter Gerard in the 2013 h.Club100 list – "an annual campaign to identify the 100 most influential and innovative people working across arts, culture and the creative industries in the UK." In connection with the h.Club100 list, Gerard also won the Young Creative Entrepreneur award from the British Council. The award included a trip to Nigeria to meet with creative entrepreneurs in Lagos.

In June 2014, Gerard was appointed Director of Audience Development and Content Operations at Vimeo.

== Early life ==
Gerard grew up in Columbia, Missouri, where as a teenager, he started a book publishing business with his family called Whip-Poor-Will Books. The company published two books written by Gerard's grandmother, Sue Gerard. Granny's Notes: My First 84 Years, published in 1998, was produced and designed by Peter Gerard. Just Leave The Dishes, published in 2002 was produced, designed and edited by Peter Gerard.
