= Martha Cooper =

American photojournalist

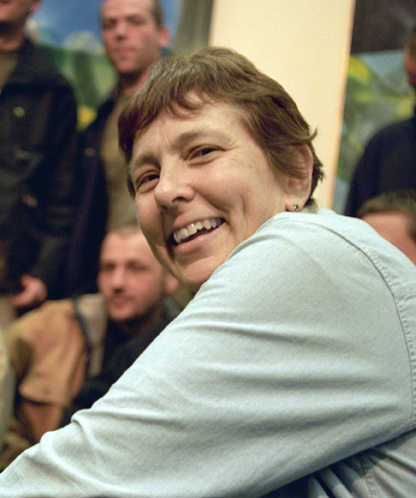
- Cooper at the Urban Discipline exhibition in Hamburg, Germany, 2001.
- Born: March 9, 1943 (age 83); Baltimore, Maryland, U.S.
- Education: Grinnell College; University of Oxford
- Known for: Photography
- Notable work: Subway Art
- Style: documentary realism
- Movement: Photojournalism; Street photography
- Website: www.kodakgirl.com

Martha Cooper is an American photojournalist. She worked as a staff photographer for the New York Post during the 1970s. She is best known for documenting the New York City graffiti scene of the 1970s and 1980s.

In 1984, Cooper and Henry Chalfant published their photographs of New York City graffiti in the book Subway Art, which has been called the graffiti bible and, by 2009, had sold half a million copies.

== Life and work ==
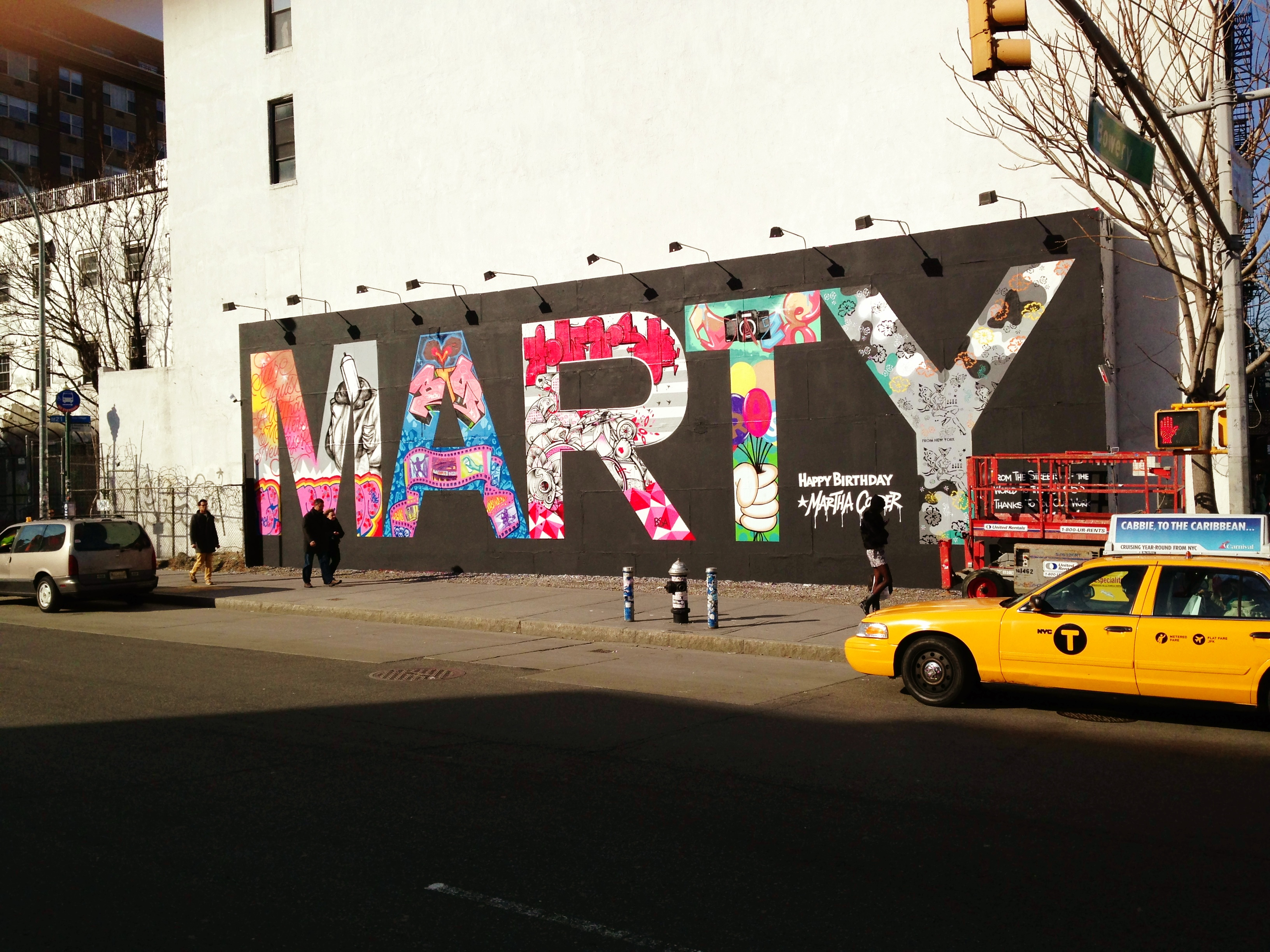
Multiple graffiti artists painted this tribute to Cooper on Houston Street for her 70th birthday in March 2013

Cooper picked up photography at the age of three. She graduated from high school when she was 16 years old, and earned an art degree at the age of 19 from Grinnell College. She taught English as a Peace Corps volunteer in Thailand, journeyed by motorcycle from Bangkok to London and received an anthropology diploma from the University of Oxford. Her first experience in artistic photography began when Cooper was in Japan, and capturing images of elaborate tattoos.

She was a photography intern at National Geographic in the 1960s, and worked as a staff photographer at the New York Post in the 1970s. Her photographs have appeared in National Geographic, Smithsonian and Natural History magazines as well as several dozen books and journals.

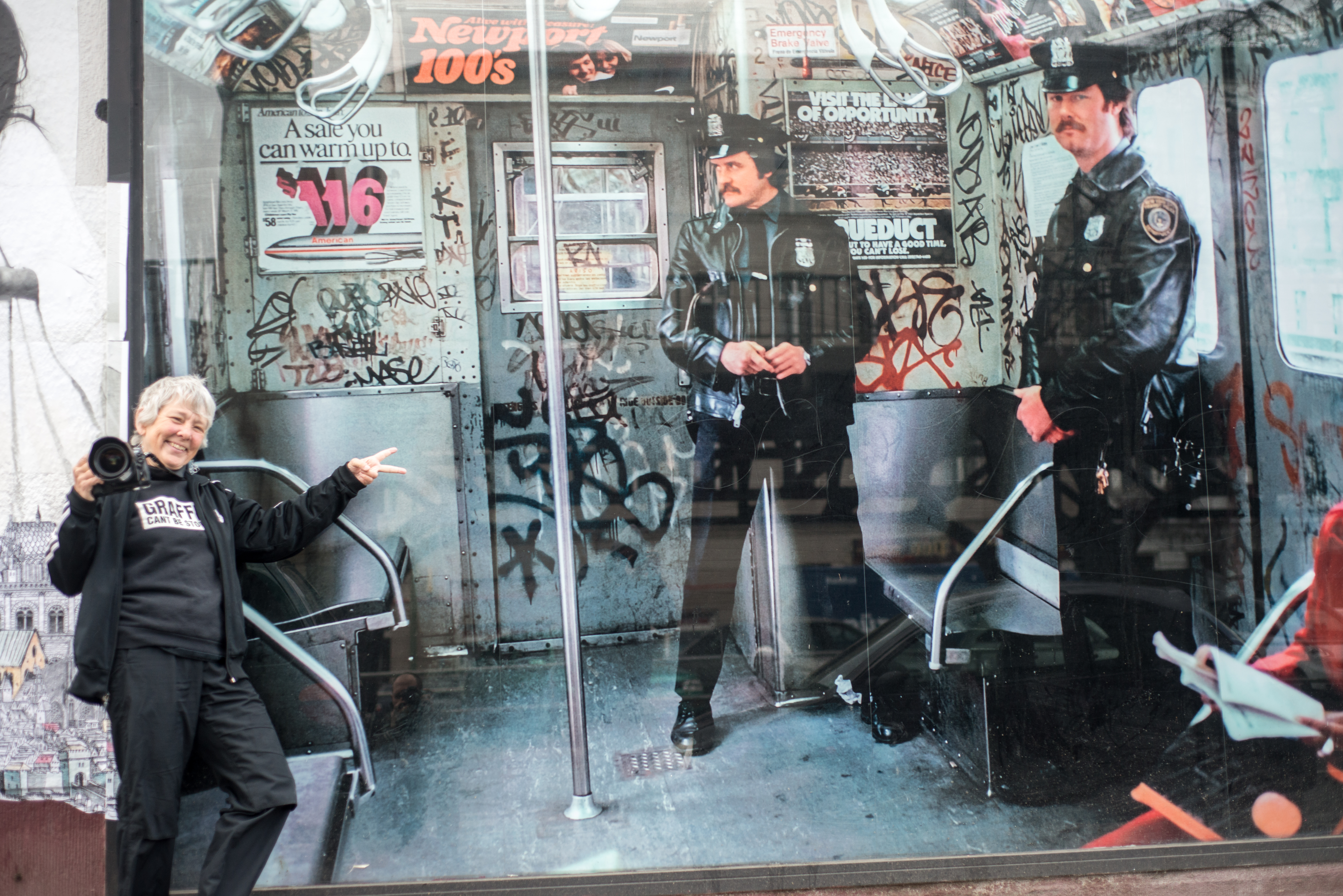
Cooper in front of a large version of her photograph "Two Cops Patrolling Subway, Bronx, NY, 1981", in Berlin, 2014.

Her most known personal work, the New York City graffiti scene of the 1970s and 1980s, began while working at the New York Post. On her return home from the Post she began taking photographs of children in her New York City neighborhood. One day she met a young kid named Edwin Serrano (He3) who helped expose her to some of the graffiti around her neighborhood. Serrano helped to explain to her that Graffiti is an art form and that each artist was actually writing their nickname.

He introduced her to the graffiti "king", DONDI. Dondi was the first to allow her to accompany him – while he was tagging she would take photos of his work. After meeting with Dondi, Cooper became fascinated with the underground subculture that these graffiti artists had created in New York City.

Martha Cooper talking to guests at the opening of her exhibition at Make a Point in Bucharest

In 1984, she put together a book of photographs illustrating the graffiti subculture called Subway Art. It became known as the Bible of street art.

In the 1980s, Cooper worked briefly in Belize photographing the people and archaeological remains of the Mayan culture at sites such as Nohmul and Cuello. Cooper lives in Manhattan, but from 2006 to 2016 she was working on a photography project in Sowebo, a Southwest Baltimore neighborhood.

Matha Cooper at the opening for "Respect the Locals: Pigeons and People." Siberia Bar, NYC. October 9, 2026.

In 2017, she joined the Make a Point Collective during the creation of the Giants of Pantelimon urban art project.

In 2019, she was the subject of a documentary feature titled Martha: A Picture Story.

== Publications ==
- Subway Art. By Cooper and Henry Chalfant. Thames & Hudson, London, 1984; Henry Holt, New York, 1984. ISBN 0-03-071963-1
- R.I.P.: New York Spraycan Memorials. Thames & Hudson, 1994. ISBN 0-500-27776-1
- Hip Hop Files: Photographs 1979-1984. From Here to Fame, 2004. ISBN 3-937946-05-5
- Street Play. From Here to Fame, 2005. ISBN 3-937946-16-0
- We B*Girlz. text by Nika Kramer, PowerHouse, 2005. ISBN 1-57687-269-6
- Tag Town. Dokument Press, 2007. ISBN 978-9185639052
- New York State of Mind. PowerHouse, 2007. ISBN 1-57687-408-7
- Going Postal. Mark Batty, 2009. ISBN 0-9799666-5-5
- Name Tagging. Mark Batty, 2010. ISBN 0-9819600-6-5
- Tokyo Tattoo 1970. Dokument, 2012. ISBN 978-9185639274
- Postcards from New York City. Dokument, 2012. ISBN 978-9185639557
- One Week With 1UP. Publikat GmbH, 2021. ISBN 9783939566519
- Spray Nation: 1980s NYC Graffiti Photos. Prestel, 2022. ISBN 9783791388748

== See also ==
- Street photography
