= Tracy 168 =

American graffiti artist (1958-2023)

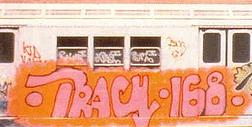
- Born: Michael Christopher Tracy; February 14, 1958; Manhattan, New York City, United States
- Died: September 3, 2023 (aged 65); Kingsbridge, Bronx, New York City, United States
- Style: Wildstyle
- Movement: Graffiti, street art
- Children: Sean Tracy
- Parents: James Tracy (father); Florence Martinez (mother)
- Website: tracy168.com

Michael Christopher Tracy (February 14, 1958 – September 3, 2023), known as Tracy 168, was an American graffiti artist. He pioneered the art form known as wildstyle. Tracy 168 came to be known as one of the most influential graffiti and street artists of all time, as variations of wildstyle writing spread around the world. He is acknowledged to have been a seminal figure in the development of street art. Books about 1970s graffiti feature his car-long paintings with their characteristic kinetic script embellished with flames, arrows as well as cartoon characters and the "Tracy face," a grinning shaggy-haired visage in wrap-around shades.

== Early life ==
Tracy was born in Manhattan, the son of a truck driver, James Tracy, and Florence Martinez. He grew up there and in Kingsbridge, Bronx.

Tracy 168 was an honorary member of the Black Spades. He formed his own group called The Wanted in the 1970s. The Wanted headquarters were in the basement of a building at 166th Street and Woodcrest Avenue in the Bronx.

== Career ==
Tracy was featured extensively in the documentary Just to Get a Rep. He discussed wildstyle and the troubled relationship between graffiti and the established art world. In July 2006, a 1984 work by Tracy covered a subway car door. The work was shown at the Brooklyn Museum of Art during its month-long exhibit, "Graffiti". Tracy was the mentor to many graffitists; Keith Haring and SAMO among them. Despite appearing in major gallery and museum shows, Tracy maintained a solid street presence with his street murals in Brooklyn and the Bronx. Tracy 168 is famous for his tags of a drawing called Purple Haze which relates and serves as a tribute to Jimi Hendrix. The artwork was part of the Experience Music Project.

== Death ==
Michael Tracy was discovered unresponsive inside a Wendy's restaurant on September 3, 2023 and reportedly died there of an apparent heart attack at the age of 65.

A memorial was held for him at the Norwood’s Valentine–Varian House, on Saturday, November 18, 2023 to remember the local artist. Organizers said the location, home to the Bronx Historical Society, was chosen due to its proximity to the Williamsbridge Oval park, where Tracy spent much of his youth, according to his son Sean Tracy.
