= Wildstyle =

Form of graffiti

Wildstyle is a complicated and intricate form of graffiti, the most complex type of graffiti piece. Due to its complexity, wildstyle can be difficult to read for those unfamiliar with the form and process. It is considered the most difficult graffiti style to master.

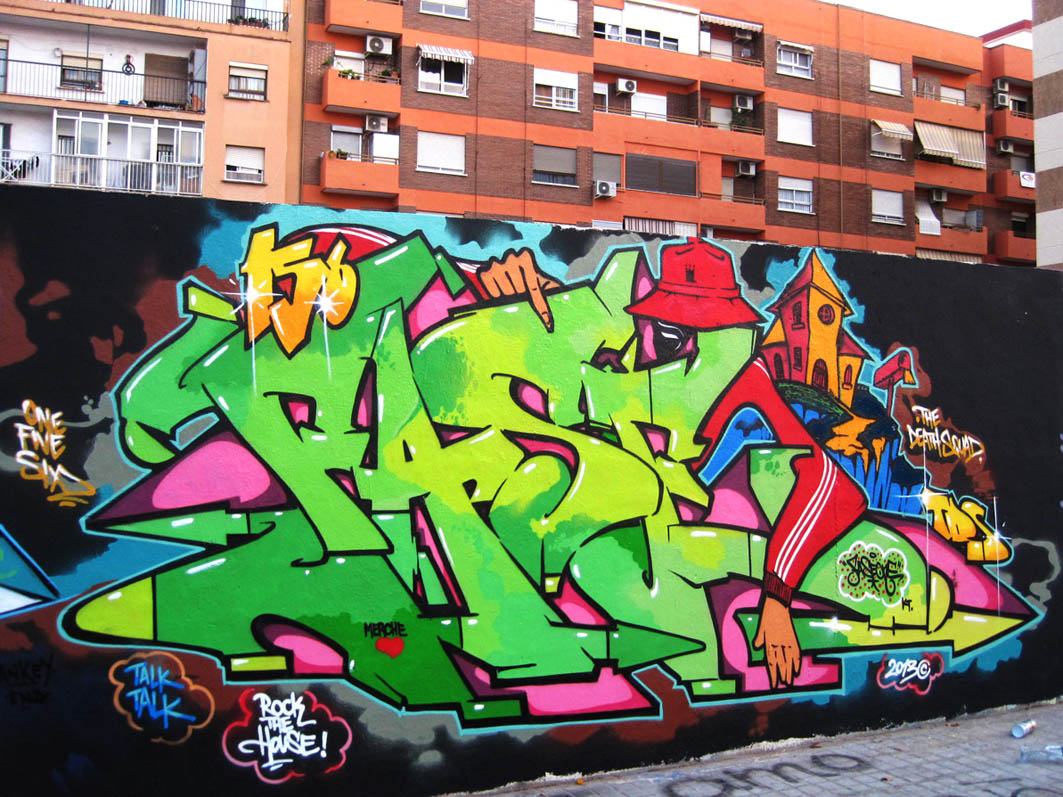
A semi-wildstyle using the word FASE

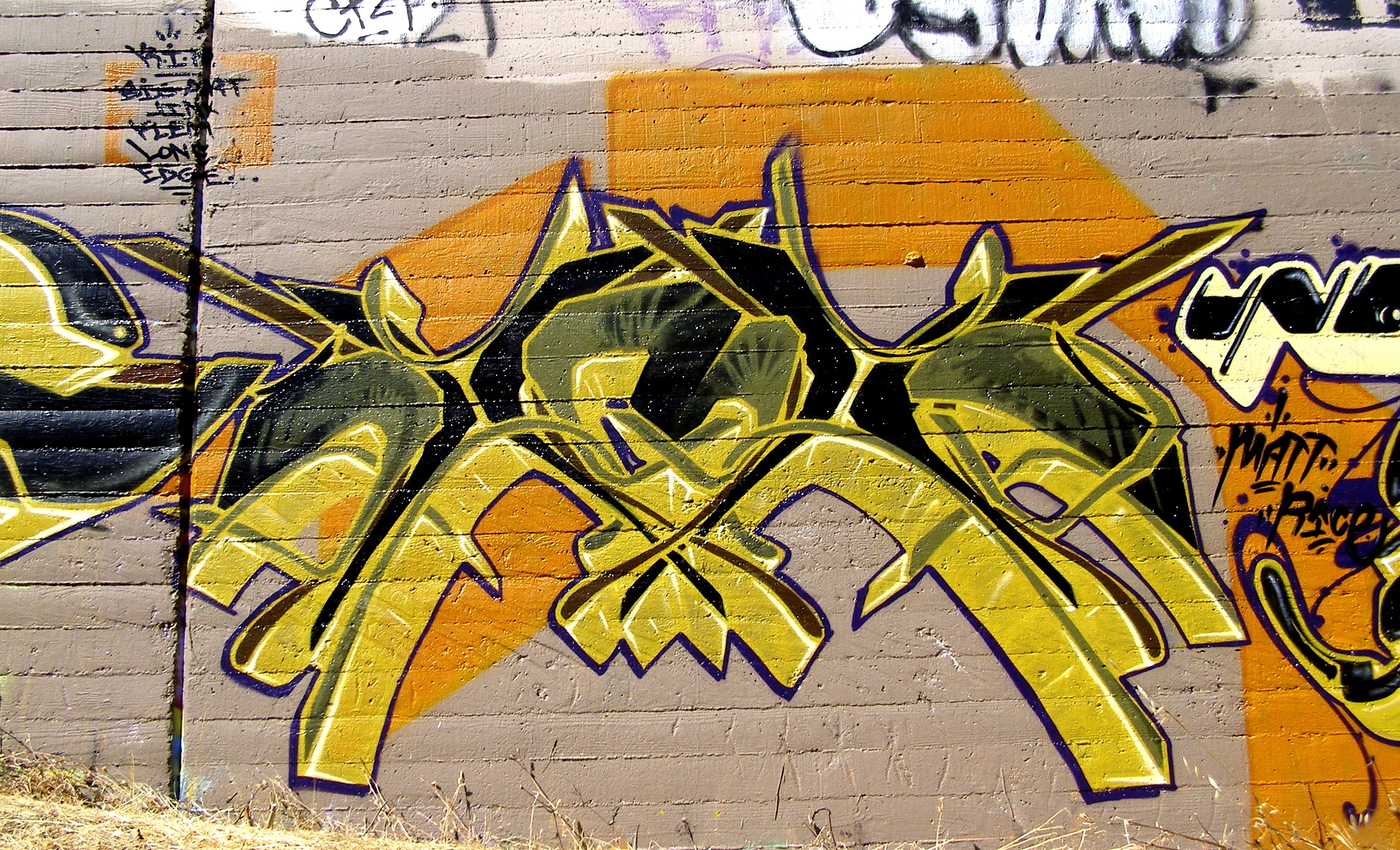

== Form ==
Wildstyle is an extremely complex form of graffiti in which letters have been transformed to the point that it is illegible to those who are not familiar with this style. This illegibility is sometimes considered a defining trait of the style.

Wildstyle has drawn inspiration from traditional calligraphy and has been described by some as partially abstract but does have specific traits associated with the form. The letters in wildstyle graffiti are often highly exaggerated with curves and overlapping, intertwined, and interlocking letters. Arrows are very common in wildstyle graffiti, and are used to suggest the flow within the artwork. Wildstyle pieces often use large amounts of vibrant colours. It is also common practice to incorporate 3D elements into wildstyle paintings.

Some pieces that are considered on the borderline between what is and is not a wildstyle are called semi-wildstyle or semi-wild.

== History ==
The term "wildstyle" was popularized by the Wild Style graffiti crew formed by Tracy 168 of the Bronx, New York in 1974 and was named after his crew, Wild Style. The style became more popular throughout the 1980s.

Phase 2 is also credited as one of the earliest writers of wildstyle.

Complex and elaborate graffiti writing had previously been known by various names such as "mechanical letters" and "bubble letters". Its first instances were generated as early as 1970, by prominent writers like RIF, Phase 2, and Stan 153 and the crews that they founded in the early 1970s centered around Manhattan subway lines and surrounds. Kase2 later introduced "computer-rock". As this stylistic approach developed, the Wild Style crew expanded and spread throughout New York City.
