= Wooster Collective =

American street art website

Wooster Collective is a website that has documented street art from around the world since 2003. It was founded by Marc and Sara Schiller, a husband-and-wife team based in New York City, and takes its name from Wooster Street in the SoHo neighborhood of New York City, where they lived when the site began. The New York Times called it "a leading street-art blog". In 2006 the Schillers curated an exhibition inside 11 Spring Street, a building known for the street art on its exterior, before it was converted into condominiums.

== History ==
=== Founding ===
According to the Schillers, they began photographing street art in their downtown Manhattan neighborhood in the weeks after the September 11 attacks in 2001. After moving to Wooster Street, they put the photographs online, and launched the site as a blog on January 13, 2003. Marc Schiller worked in advertising and marketing; in 2010 Variety described him as the founder of Wooster Collective and chief executive of the media agency Electric Artists, which worked on the marketing of Banksy's film Exit Through the Gift Shop. Sara Schiller began working with him on film distribution with that film's release.

=== Activity ===
The site publishes photographs of street art from cities around the world, along with interviews with artists and reviews of exhibitions. In 2006 XLR8R described it as a non-profit site run by the Schillers from their New York apartment, receiving more than 400 emails a day and offering event listings, podcasts and city tours by artists. A 2008 New York Times guide to street art in the city recommended the site as "a good place to start".

In March 2005 Wooster Collective published photographs, supplied by Banksy, of the artist in disguise hanging his own works in the Museum of Modern Art, the Metropolitan Museum of Art, the American Museum of Natural History and the Brooklyn Museum. Reuters reported on the stunt the following day and noted that the pictures had been posted on the site.

On May 22, 2006, Wooster Collective and Eyebeam presented an evening of technology-based graffiti projects at Eyebeam's space on West 21st Street, with work by Mark Jenkins, the Graffiti Research Lab and students from a "Geek Graffiti" course at Parsons. Jenkins and the Graffiti Research Lab debuted their collaboration Jesus 2.0, a light sculpture, at the event. Marc Schiller later served as a trustee of Eyebeam; the organization's tax returns list him on its board for the fiscal years ending June 2014 and June 2015.

=== Later activity ===
The Schillers have also lectured on street art. In February 2008 they gave a talk titled "From the Streets to the Gallery: How Contemporary Art is Being Influenced by the Urban Experience" for the Washington Project for the Arts at American University's Katzen Arts Center in Washington, D.C., and in 2010 they shared a street art session with the artist Faith47 at the Design Indaba conference. In 2011 they spoke at TEDx in Bloomington, Indiana, under the title "Gaming the Streets: Uncommissioned Art", and at the New York edition of the Pictoplasma character-design conference, held at Parsons on November 4 and 5, 2011.

The Schillers took part in other exhibitions. In June 2008 they teamed up with three graffiti artists brought from Romania by the Romanian Cultural Institute in Murray Hill to paint the institute's gallery walls for an exhibition opening. In 2012 they curated Hybrid Thinking at Jonathan LeVine Gallery (January 14 to February 11, 2012), a group show of six artists from outside the United States, Dal, Herakut, Hyuro, Roa, Sit and Vinz, whose work combined human and animal figures.

In 2013 the Schillers curated 10 Years of Wooster Collective: 2003–2013, a group exhibition held with Jonathan LeVine's gallery in a pop-up space at 525 West 22nd Street in Chelsea from August 7 to 24, 2013. It included work by Swoon, Faile, Invader, Shepard Fairey, JR, Olek and Dan Witz, among others. Murals by Shepard Fairey, Eltono, Buff Monster, Faith47 and others were painted in Dumbo and Williamsburg in conjunction with the show.

In 2015 Marc Schiller had a stroke that left him with aphasia. He later directed No Bone: Scars of Survival (2020), a documentary about his recovery, which was shown at the ReelAbilities film festival.

== 11 Spring Street Project ==
11 Spring Street, a 19th-century former stable and carriage house in Nolita, had for about two decades been covered in graffiti and street art on its exterior. In 2006 it was bought by the developers Caroline Cummings and Bill Elias, who planned to convert it into condominiums. Wanting to mark the building's history, they contacted the Schillers, and together they decided to invite street artists to cover the five floors of the interior with new work. The project took no sponsorship, issued no press releases, paid no artists and sold no artwork.

About 45 artists worked in the building for nearly two months, including Shepard Fairey, D*Face, Jace, Lady Pink, Skewville, and Bo and Microbo of Milan. The building was open to the public from December 15 to 17, 2006, after which renovation was to begin. Most of the interior work was to be covered by drywall, which Marc Schiller described as sealing it in "this incredible time capsule". In 2008 The New York Times reported that Cummings was working with Wooster Collective and the design firm Pentagram on a book about the building's graffiti and the exhibition, with proceeds to go to charity.

== Publications ==
In 2007 Wooster Collective published All My Friends Are Made of Paper, a monograph on the street artist Armsrock with an introduction by Swoon, as the first book in its Wooster on Paper series. The second, Graphite (2012), collected pencil drawings by 31 artists, among them Blu, Conor Harrington, Gaia, Paul Alexander Thornton and Word to Mother.

The Schillers also co-wrote, with the critic Carlo McCormick, Trespass: A History of Uncommissioned Urban Art, published by Taschen in 2010. In 2016, for the tenth anniversary of the 11 Spring Street show, they published Eleven Spring: A Celebration of Street Art, a book documenting the exhibition.

== Reception ==
Writing in The New York Times in 2006, Geeta Dayal said that sites such as Wooster Collective "function as digital galleries and as clearinghouses for street art on an international level". The same year, The Washington Post described it as "the online hub ... that showcases digital images of urban installations". Reviewing the 2013 anniversary show, Complex wrote that Wooster Collective "is partially responsible for introducing the larger art world to street art in the first place" and that the Schillers' work had been "instrumental in the movement and documentation of street art for the last 10 years". In 2016 LA Taco called it a "foundational street art blog", and Ray Mock, writing for Vice's The Creators Project, said the site "was to street art what 12 Oz Prophet was to graffiti".
