= Blu (artist) =

Italian street artist

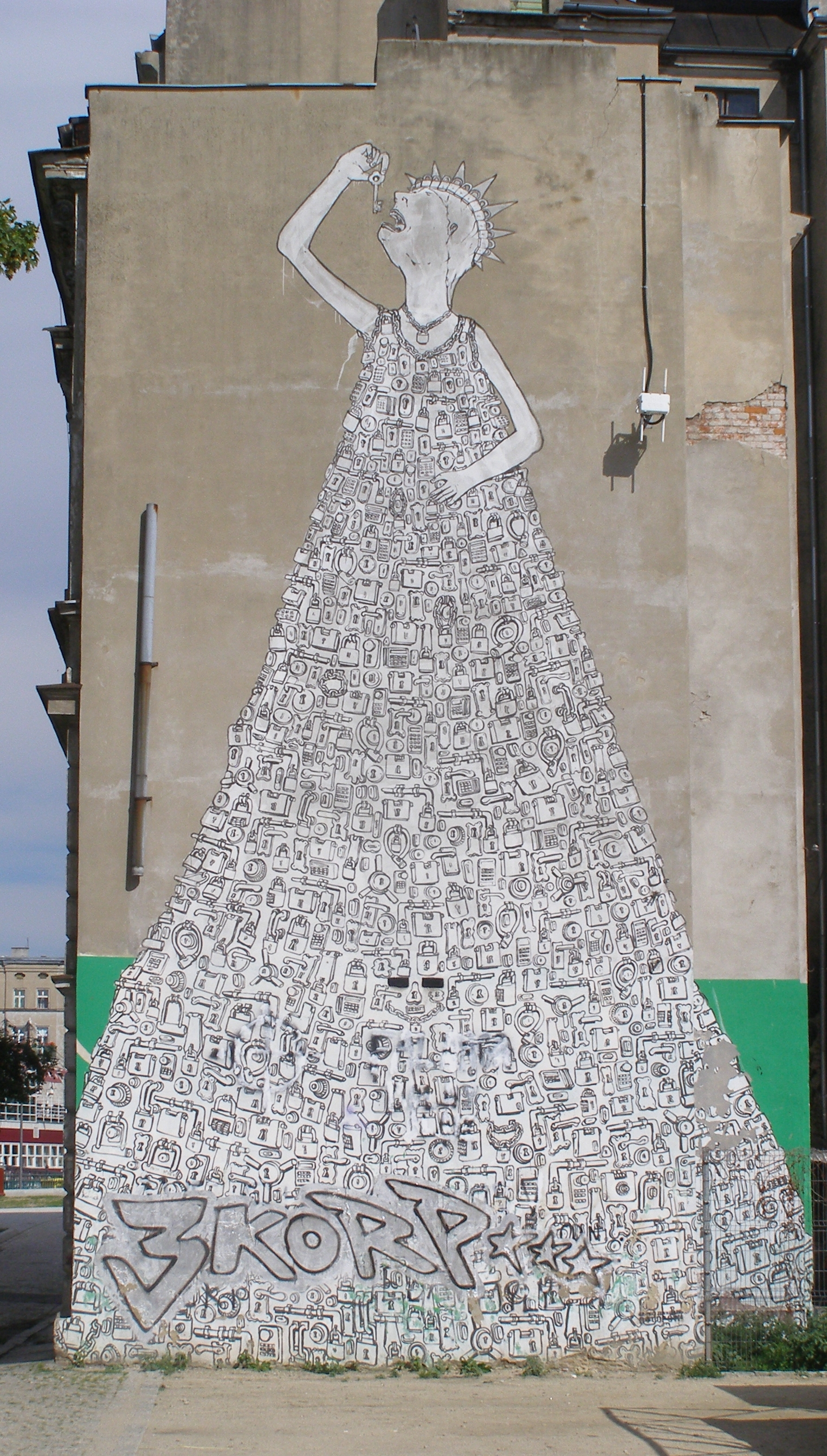
- The Statua zniewolenia piece by Blu on a building on Malt Island, Wrocław in 2013 (originally painted in 2008)
- Born: 1980s Senigallia, Italy
- Style: Street art
- Movement: Graffiti
- Website: blublu.org/b/

Tag
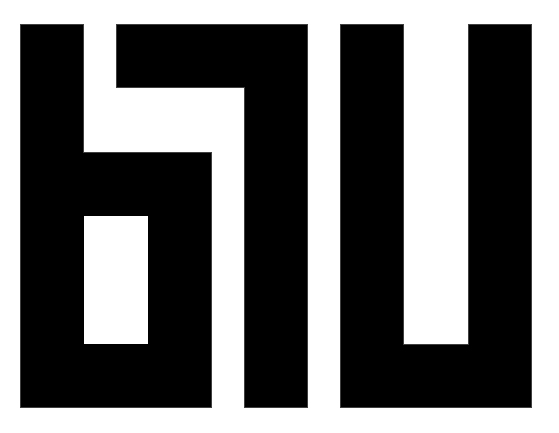

Blu is the pseudonym of an Italian artist who conceals his real identity. It is known that he was born in Senigallia. He lives in Bologna and has been active in street art since 1999.

== Places ==
=== Central and South America ===
Blu's nomadic spirit peaked in 2005. From the end of that year, Blu spent most of his time jumping from place to place in self-guided travels, linking his itineraries to the festivals to which he was invited. During that time, he collaborated with Ericailcane and several artists from Costa Rica, Nicaragua, Guatemala, and Honduras in a festival in Managua called "Murales de Octubre." During the festival, he painted a wall, significant in the history of South American murals, on the Avenida Bolivar, where, in 1979, Victor Canifrù celebrated the Sandinista revolution. This mural was then dubbed "Hombre Banano" (Banana Man) by the locals, referring to the protest of the workers on banana plantations.

The following year, from October 2006 to December 2006, he returned to Central and South America for a long circuit of murals that included Mexico City, Guatemala City, Managua, San José (Costa Rica), and finally, Buenos Aires (Argentina). He was followed during the trip by filmmaker Lorenzo Fonda, who documented the experience and turned it into the documentary film Megunica, for which Blu created a series of animated segments using digital software. The film also includes the first documented painted stop-motion animation by Blu. A year later, he was again in South America, in São Paulo, Brazil, participating in the festival "A Conquista do Espaço" (Conquering Space). On that occasion, he came up with a new interpretation of the "Christ of Corcovado" of Rio de Janeiro. In Blu's version, Christ is literally submerged by tons of guns and rifles. From the fall of 2007 to the spring of 2008, he lived in Buenos Aires, creating a video called Muto (Silent), which received the Grand Prix 2009 from the Festival of Clermont-Ferrand. This video is composed of hundreds of paintings on walls, made throughout many streets of Buenos Aires, and, frame by frame, creates more than seven minutes of an animated mural.

In 2009, Blu started another tour around South America, visiting Bogotá for the festival "Memoria Canalla," then Montevideo, Uruguay, back to Buenos Aires, and, for the first time, Lima, Peru, where he painted the entire façade of an historical building in the central Avenida Arenales. In this huge mural, Blu seems to reinterpret the history of South America, a continent that has been violated by both ancient and modern conquistadores.

In 2013, he participated in the Bienal de Arte Urbano (BAU) in Cochabamba, Bolivia.

=== North America ===
In 2008, Blu accepted an invitation from the Deitch Gallery in New York to paint the exterior of their Long Island location. After being invited by the Museum of Contemporary Art, Los Angeles to paint the exterior wall of the museum for its "Art in the Street" exhibition, its director Jeffrey Deitch ordered the resulting mural to be whitewashed the day after it was finished, probably due to its political content. The mural represented two rows of coffins, each draped with a one-dollar bill in place of the American flag.

=== West Bank ===
In 2007, Santa's Ghetto, a London-based art collective that organises annual happenings of painting performances and print trade fairs, invited Blu to a festival that took place in the West Bank. Blu was part of a group of artists, including Banksy, Mark Jenkins, Ron English, Swoon, and Faile who painted on the wall around Bethlehem that separates the West Bank from Israel. On a watchtower border, Blu painted a figure of a person trying to tear down the walls with his finger.

=== Europe ===
==== Austria ====
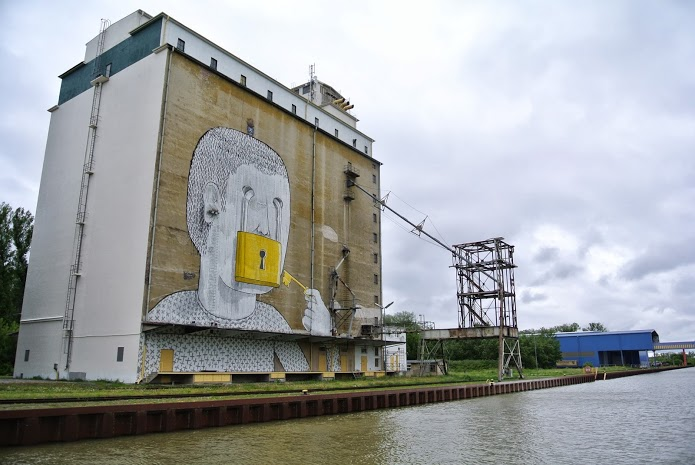
Vienna, Albern harbour mural, 2010-2013

In 2010, Blu was invited to Vienna to paint a mural at the Danube River harbour near Albern in the city district of Simmering. First suggested in 1923 as one possibility for the expansion of Vienna's harbour facilities, Albern was selected for realisation by the German Reich Ministry of Transport (Reichsverkehrsministerium) in 1939, a year after the "Anschluss" of Austria to Nazi Germany. The project was to serve as a logistic node of a future geo- and biopolitical order, designated for the transshipment of grain from the annexed or economically colonized regions of eastern and south-eastern Europe to the heartlands of the German Reich. For the construction of the harbour basin and its five granaries between 1939 and 1942, the Nazi regime employed forced labour. Realized on one of the granaries, Blue's mural called upon the overdue historical and social commemoration of the place's charged history and the unknown fates of the forced labourers who built it. The commissioned piece was destroyed in autumn 2013 in the course of renovation works.

==== England ====
In 2007, Blu went to London for the first time, where he made many pieces around Camden Town and Willow Street and at the former headquarters of the art gallery website Pictures on Walls. That same summer, he took part in a two-man exhibit with Ericailcane at the Lazarides Gallery. The following year, the Tate Modern presented an exhibition on the phenomenon of street art and invited Blu, along with JR, Faile, Sixeart, and Os Gêmeos e Nunca, to paint its entire main façade.

==== Germany ====
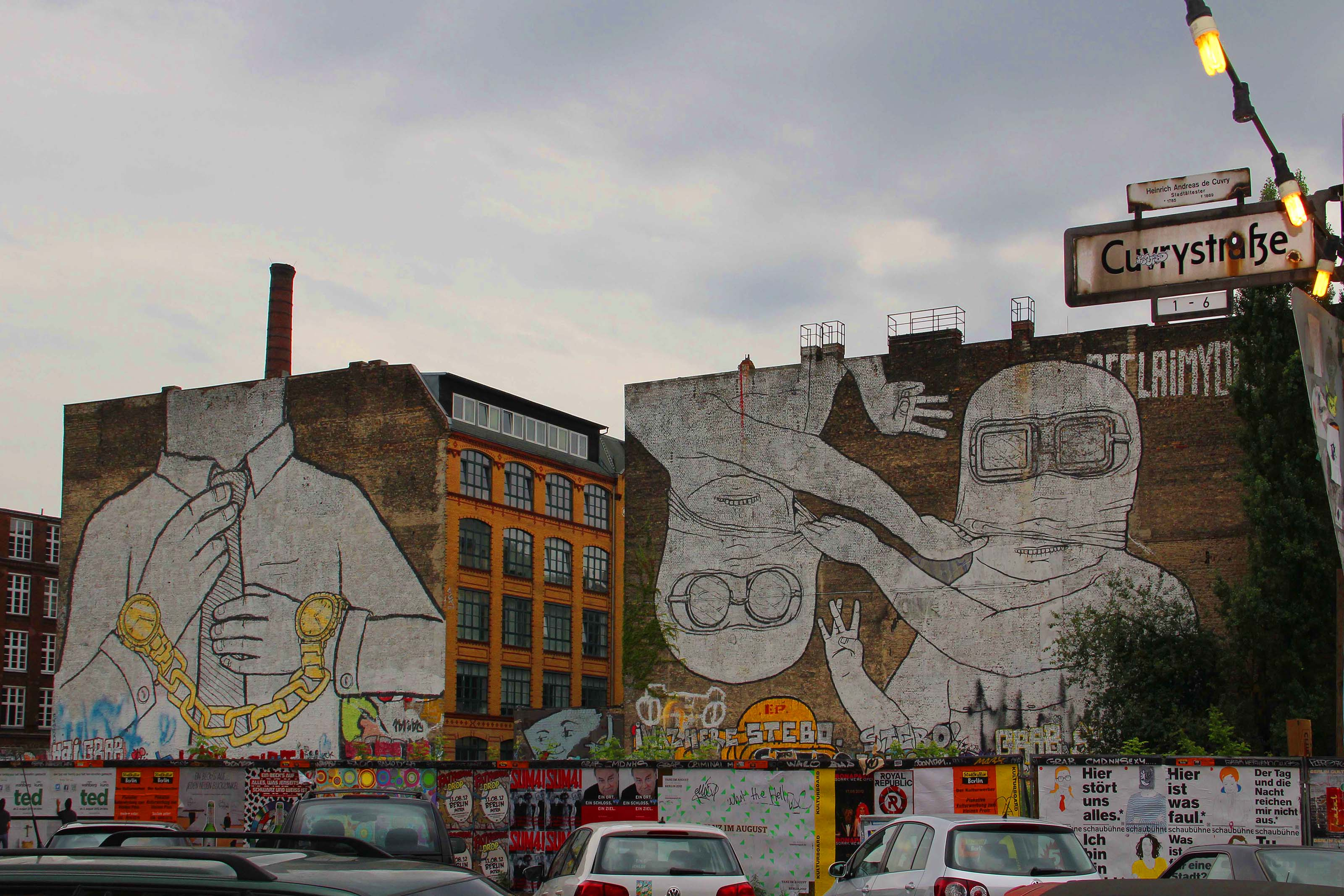
Murals in Cuvrystraße, 2007-2014.

Blu worked in Germany on many occasions between 2006 and 2009, mostly in Berlin and always around Cuvrystraße in a multi-ethnic neighborhood called Kreuzberg. Thanks to his participation in several of the festivals "Backjump" and "Planetprozess," he had the opportunity to create some of his works, one of which was painted in combination with gigantic photos by the French artist JR.

In 2006, during one of these trips, Blu made his first digital animation from images painted directly on a wall, a technique that would be a recurrent theme of many of his future videos, such as "Muto."

In consultation with Blu, the two murals at Cuvrystraße were covered with black paint in 2014 by a group of people as a sign of discontent with the city's urban development policies in the area.

==== Italy ====
Italy, above any other country, can boast of having the majority of Blu's graffiti, both illegal and legal. Among the public projects worth noting are the façade of PAC (the Contemporary Art Pavilion) in Milan, finished in 2008; the murals in that city's Bicocca and Lambrate train stations, done in 2008 and 2009; three editions of "Spina Festival" in Comacchio (2005, 2006, and 2007); and two editions of "Fame Festival a Grottaglie" (2008 and 2009). In this last one, Blu completed a video animation with the New York-based artist, David Ellis. Blu has also taken part in many editions of the festival "Icone" in Modena and in Ancona's "Festival Pop Up" in 2008, where he painted, along with Ericailcane a gigantic silos next to the harbor waterfront. Other Italian cities where Blu has left his mark are varied, among which are Prato, Florence, Grosseto, Turin, Ancona, Rovereto, Verona and Pesaro. In Bologna, he wrote most of his first works because of his studies at the city's university. In 2016, he deleted all murals painted in Bologna due to the decision taken by the municipality, which made an exhibition trying to profit from Blu's graffiti without his permission.

Blu has also painted in several "Centri Sociali", places that are between squats and self-managed cultural centers. In Bologna his work is visible at XM24, TPO, Livello 57, Crash; in Rome at Forte Prenestino and Collatino; in Milan at Cox 18 and Leoncavallo and in Pisa at Cantiere San Bernardo.

==== Spain ====
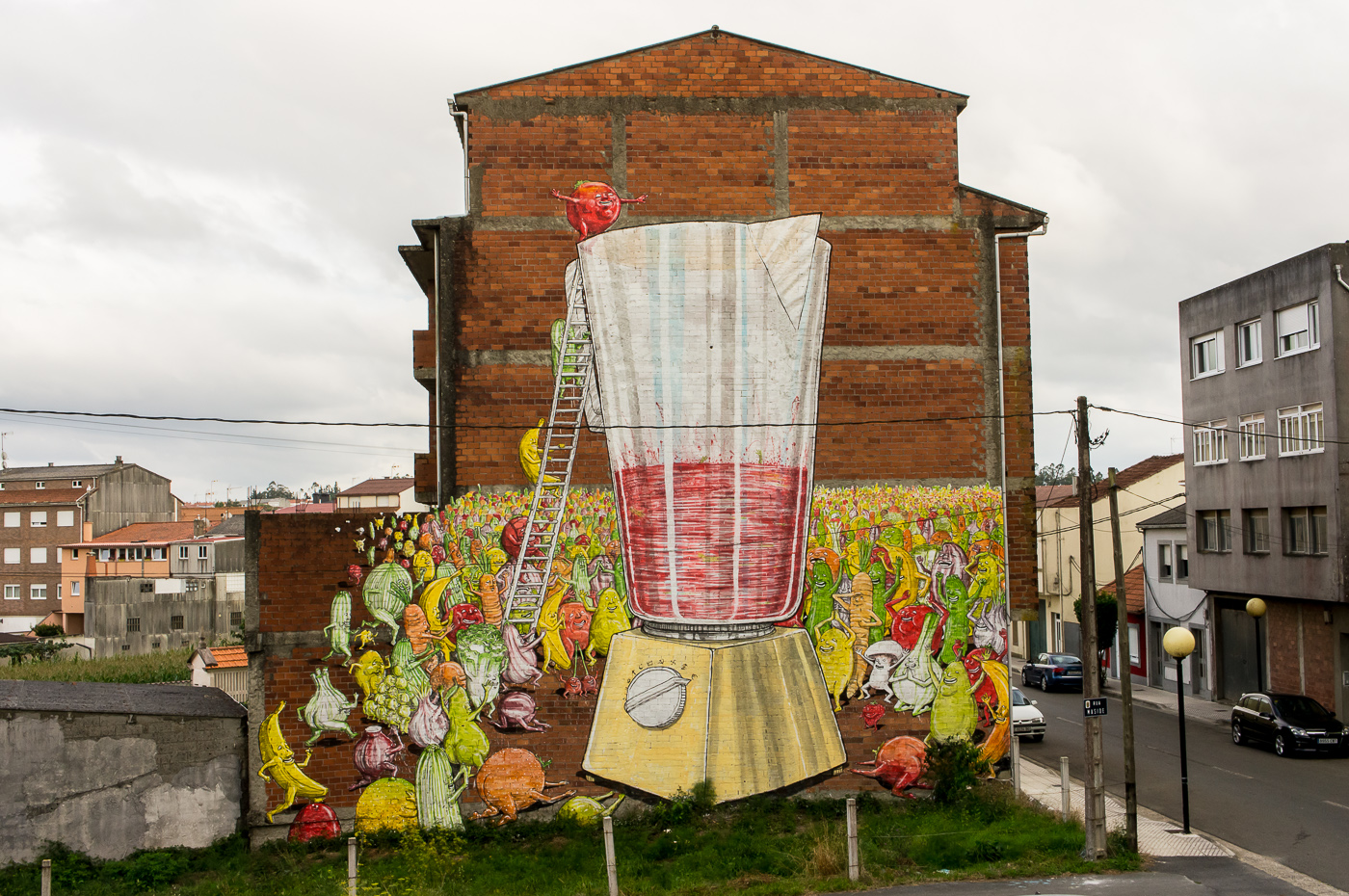
Ordes, 2012.

Blu has frequently visited Spain. At the festival "Segundo Asalto" in Zaragoza, he, along with the artists San, Eltono, Nuria, and Nano, painted a mural of a colossal minotaur picking up an astonished man. Blu's murals can also be found in Valencia, Linares, Madrid and Barcelona. In Barcelona's Barrio Carmelo neighborhood, Blu took part in the 2008 edition of the festival "The Influencers". With the global economic crisis looming, Blu painted a threatening shark whose skin is completely covered in euro bills.

== US censorship ==
- He was invited in Los Angeles for the exhibition "Art in the Streets" but his work on the side of the Geffen Contemporary Wing of MOCA was censored.

== Bibliography ==
- Backjumps (2007). The Live Issue #3: Urban Communication and Aesthetics, William Stratmann, ISBN 978-3-937946-27-6
- Dietrich, Lucas (2009). 60: Innovators Shaping Our Creative Future, Thames & Hudson.
- Hundertmark, Christian (2006). The Art of Rebellion 2: World of Urban Art Activism (No. 2)
- Iosifidis, Kiriakos (2009). Mural Art, Volume 2: Murals on Huge Public Surfaces Around the World from Graffiti to Trompe L'Oeil, Gingko Press.
- Lazarides, Steve (2009). Outsiders: Art by People
- Lewisohn, Cedar, editor (2008). Street Art: The Graffiti Revolution, HNA Books.
- Manco, Tristan (2007). Street Sketchbook: Inside the Journals of International Street and Graffiti Artists, Chronicle Books.
- Tschiedl, Roman (2014). BLU - Untitled/it is obvious, In: Taig, Maria [Ed.]: Kör vie 07-10: Public art Vienna 2007 - 2010, Verlag für moderne Kunst

== Editions ==
- Blu (2018). Minima muralia, Special edition, Zooo Print and Press
- Blu (2018). Minima muralia, Zooo Print and Press
- Blu (2008). Blu 2004-2007, Studio Cromie
- Blu (2006). Nulla, Zooo Print and Press.
- Blu (2005). 25 disegni (with Ericailcane), Zooo Print and Press.
