= Ann Lewis (artist) =

Activist artist

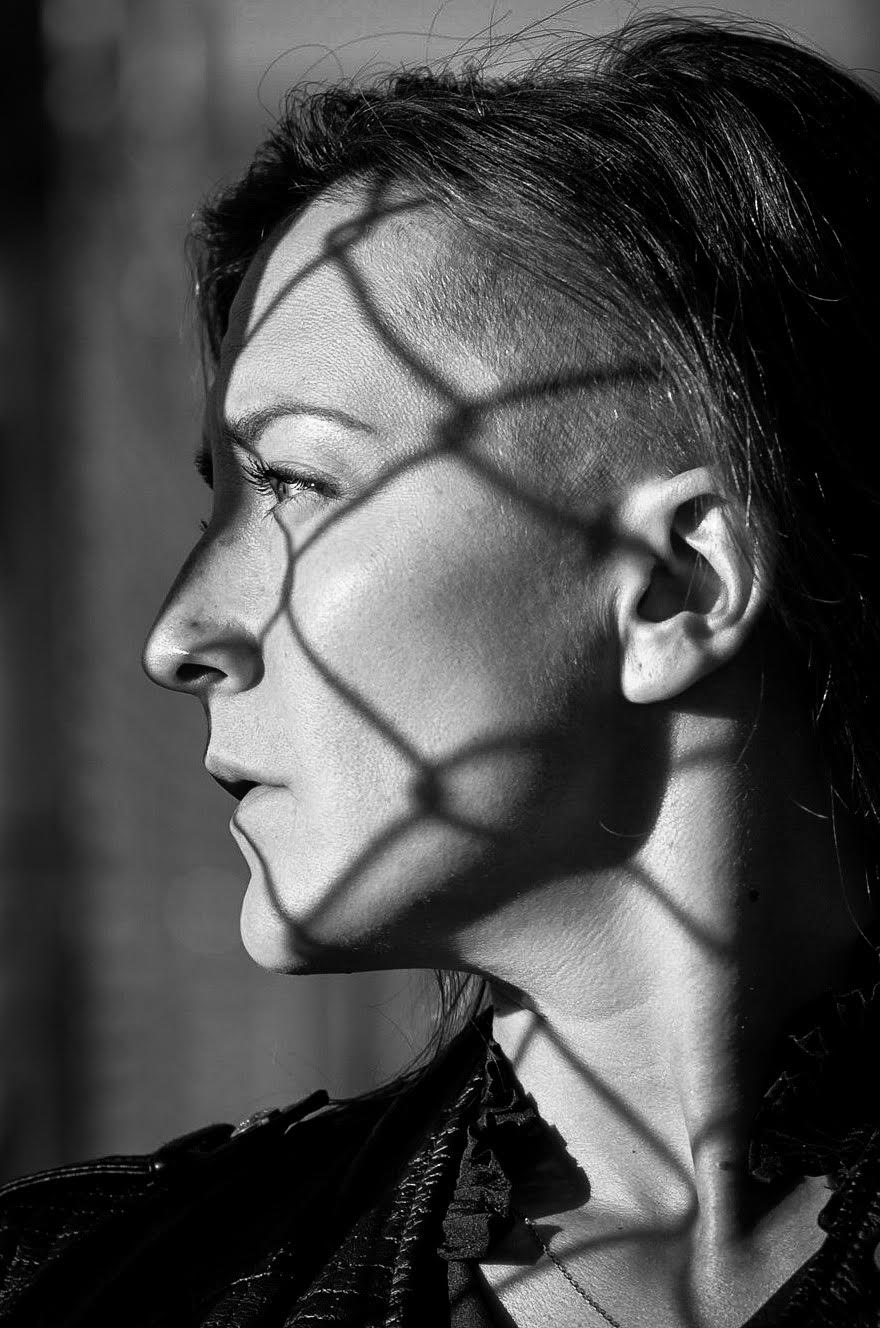
Ann Lewis in 2017

Ann Lewis (born 1981 Duluth, Minnesota) is a multidisciplinary activist artist often working in public spaces. She focuses her attention on social justice and environmental issues and is best known for her politically charged and sometimes uncommissioned takeovers of public space. She is a 2018 artist-in-residence at the Santa Fe Art Institute Residency for Equal Justice. She lives and works between Detroit, MI and Brooklyn, NY.

== Work ==
A multidisciplinary activist artist using painting, installation, and participatory performance, Lewis explores the American identity, power structures, and justice. Her work often incorporates repetition through graphic elements and a limited color palette. She is known for producing work that encourages dialogue and drives community participation. Lewis began her public art career as a street artist under the pseudonym GILF! and in early 2014 garnered national media attention when she installed an oversized police tape banner that read “GENTRIFICATION IN PROGRESS” at the former graffiti mecca 5 Pointz in Queens, New York.

Her most recent public art commission, See Her, shines a light on mass incarceration in the context of former female inmates reentering society. The work was created in collaboration with residents at local reentry facility for incarcerated women run by Community Resources for Justice in Boston and Now + There, a Boston-based public art nonprofit, as part of its Year of the Woman series, which was named one of Hyperallergic’s top 20 U.S. exhibitions of 2017.

Her piece White Lies #1, an American flag on which she has reproduced every false statement made by President Trump during his first year in office in white ink, was highlighted in media coverage of Parade Against Patriarchy at Art Basel in Miami Beach, 2017. The group was led by feminist artist Michelle Pred and included Krista Suh, the creator of the Pussyhat Project, who brought a numbered edition of the pink knit hats worn by women during the Women's Marches across the nation the day after Trump's inauguration.

Lewis has collaborated with various brands and organizations over the years, including the fashion house Rebecca Minkoff, where she designed a limited edition series of moto jackets; proceeds from the sale of the jackets were donated to Not on Our Watch, a human rights charity. The Amplifier Foundation, a nonprofit organization that leverages art to drive social change, commissioned her work in 2016. She has worked with Young New Yorkers, a nonprofit dedicated to keeping young people out of prison, since 2014. In 2016, she served as the curator for the organization's benefit auction, which included donated works from more than 80 socially minded artists such as Shepard Fairey, Icy & Sot, Ben Eine, Swoon, Gaia, Dan Witz, Cey Adams, Li-Hill, and ASVP, among others.

Lewis is featured in the upcoming documentary, Street Heroines.

== Themes ==
Lewis's work focuses on social justice and political issues such as mass incarceration, women's rights, police brutality, and gentrification.

== Selected public art commissions ==
- See Her - Now + There, Boston, MA, 2017
- Empower Equality - Pride Heritage Orlando Memorial, New York City, 2016
- Never turn your Back on the Ocean - Asbury Park Mural Project, Asbury Park, NJ, 2015

== Solo and selected group shows, residencies ==
- Santa Fe Art Institute Equal Justice Residency, 2018
- Truth to Power/Rock the Vote - Philadelphia, 2016
- Race & Revolution - Governors Island, New York City, 2016
- SHATTERING - Joseph Gross Gallery, New York City, 2015
- Staufferstadt Residency, Strasburg, VA, 2015
