= Gusmano Cesaretti =

Italian photographer and artist (born 1944)

- Born: 24 July 1944 (age 81); Porcari, Lucca, Italy
- Occupations: Photographer, artist, film visual consultant
- Spouse: Rosa Cesaretti (m. 1984)
- Children: 2
- Parent(s): Bruno Cesaretti, Delfa Cesaretti
- Website: gusmanocesaretti.com

Gusmano Cesaretti (born 24 July 1944) is a self-taught Italian photographer and artist born in Porcari (Lucca), Italy to Bruno Cesaretti and Delfa Cesaretti. He has also worked in films as a producer and visual consultant. He is one of the first photographers to document the East Los Angeles street culture, and has produced photojournalistic works in locations around the world, including North, Central, and South America, Southeast Asia, China, Africa, and the Midwest.

== Los Angeles street life ==
Cesaretti is known for his photo documentations of Los Angeles lifestyles, the Klique car club, Chicano street barrio culture, and LA gang life.

== Other locations ==
Cesaretti created series of photographs in Cuba, Bolivia, Panama, Brazil, Mexico, China, Thailand, Lebanon, Israel, Africa, and Chicago's South Side and Cabrini–Green Housing Project. These photographic studies are documented on his website.

== Curator and publisher ==
Cesaretti has curated many exhibitions, beginning with his Pasadena, California, gallery Cityscape Foto Gallery, which he founded in 1977. He was instrumental in arranging the exhibition of several major works by Los Angeles street artists in the Los Angeles Museum of Contemporary Art's blockbuster 2011 Art in the Streets show, including works by the Chosen Few MC. In 2014, he started publishing Los Angeles FOTOFOLIO, an underground journal of black-and-white photography by well-known and emerging photographers, distributed free of charge in Los Angeles, New York, Paris, London, and Mexico City.

== Books and exhibitions ==
Cesaretti's photographs have appeared in many books and magazines as well as several artist monographs, including Street Writers (Acrobat Books, 1975), 5 x 5 = 24 (Arte Povera, 1979), Fragments of Los Angeles (Damian/Alleged Press, 2013), and Dentro le Mura (Arte Povera, 2014). His work has been exhibited at the Huntington Library, the Los Angeles Museum of Contemporary Art, and the Smithsonian Institution. In 2025, his work was featured in Gente di Fotografia, issue 84, in a portfolio titled Close Up.

== Work in films ==
Cesaretti has worked closely with film directors Michael Mann, Tony Scott, and Marc Forster, to create the look and feel of many feature films, including Last of the Mohicans, The Insider, Public Enemies, The Taking of Pelham 123, Quantum of Solace, Collateral, Heat, Miami Vice, Stay, Manhunter, and Ali.

== Personal life ==
Gusmano has been married to Rosa Cesaretti since 1984. They have a son, Vasco Cesaretti. Gusmano has a daughter, Tosca Cesaretti, from a previous marriage. He also has a sister, Manuela Cesaretti.
