= Momo (artist) =

American artist

Momo, sometimes stylised as "MOMO" (born 1974, San Francisco), is an American artist. Originally from San Francisco, he is known for his post-graffiti murals and studio painting. Momo began his experimental outdoor work in the late 90s, working with homemade tools in public spaces. Since 2009 he has been expanding his focus to include a substantial studio practice. He is currently based in New Orleans, Louisiana.

Notable mural commissions include Facebook, Pepsi, the NFL, the World Trade Center, John Hancock Tower, Art Production Fund NY, European Capital of Culture, the NYC DOT, and Yohji Yamamoto's Y-3. Self organized walls in Jamaica, Sicily, and Arizona (2013, 2016, 2018), painted at the artists expense, have been important in demonstrating innovative techniques for a general audience free of the usual commercial concerns.

In 2016 Maya Hayuk, MOMO, Swoon, and Faile inaugurated the new Millennium Iconoclast Museum of Art in Brussels, with installations on five floors. Solo shows the following year were held at Delimbo Gallery in Sevilla and Alice Gallery in Belgium, as well as an experimental group show with Mark Flood, Revok, and Paul Kremer at Library Street Collective in Detroit. MOMO is a long-time collaborator with fellow artist Eltono.

== Mural commissions (selection) ==
- The Crystal Ship, Oostende, 2023
- Ogden Museum of Southern Art, Louisiana 2019
- Yuma Arts Center, Yuma, Arizona 2018
- Home of the Arts, Gold Coast, Australia 2018
- Facebook, New York 2017
- Facebook Headquarters, California 2017
- Mercedes House, NYC 2017
- Art Production Fund, NYC 2015
- Hudson River Trading Headquarters - 4 World Trade Center, NYC 2017
- Miami Dolphins Stadium, 2016
- Philadelphia Mural Arts, 2016
- Ace Hotel Palm Springs, California 2015
- John Hancock Tower, Boston 2015
- Wynwood Walls (Art Basel), Miami 2012
- Bien Urbain Besançon, France 2012, 2013
- Fame Grottaglie, Italy 2010, 2011, 2012
- Open Walls Baltimore Baltimore, Maryland 2012
- Incubate Tilburg, Holland 2011
- Outomatic Leuven, Belgium 2011
- Nova Contemporary Culture Rio de Janeiro, Brazil 2011
- Crono Festival Lisbon, Portugal 2011

== Exhibitions (selection) ==
- Machine Show (group) Library Street Collective, Detroit, Michigan 2017
- Wilderness, Delimbo Gallery, Seville, Spain 2017
- Best Picture, Alice Gallery, Brussels, Belgium 2017
- City Lights (group), MIMA Museum, Brussels, Belgium 2016
- Darmon 2, Studio Cromie, Grottaglie, Italy, 2013
- There Are No Wheels in Nature, Winterlong Gallery, Niort, France 2014
- Just Before Brazil (Group) Alice Gallery, Brussels 2014
- Butt Joints, May Gallery and Residency, New Orleans, Louisiana 2013
- Hecho en Oaxaca (Group), Museo de Arte Contemporáneo de Oaxaca, Mexico, 2013
- Darmon, Studio Cromie, Grottaglie, Italy, 2013
- Artscapes (group), Scion Installation Space, Los Angeles 2010
- Nova, Museu da Imagem e do Som, São Paulo, Brazil 2010
- Post-Graffiti, Geometry, and Abstraction (Group), Fundación Caixa Galicia LaCoruna, Spain 2010
- Y-3 F/W 2009, NY Fashion Week Show, (Runway and Clothing), Pier 40 New York 2009
- PLAF (with Eltono), Anonymous Gallery, New York NY 2008
- MMMB ( with Melissa Brown), Espeis Archetype Gallery, Williamsburg NY 2008
- 11 Spring Street (Group), New York NY 2006
