= Dan Witz =

American painter

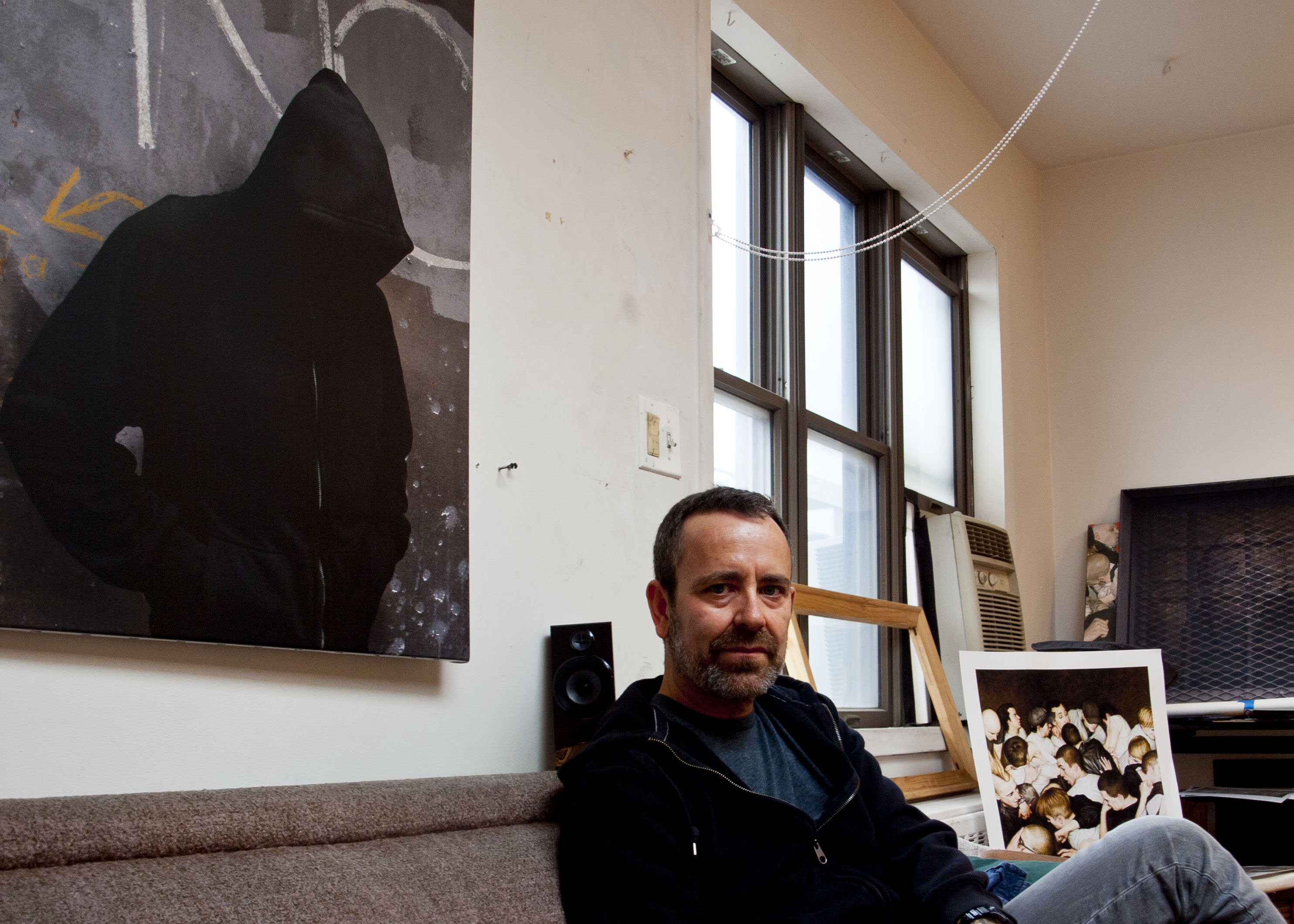
- Dan Witz in studio
- Born: October 19, 1957 (age 68); Chicago, IL
- Education: 1980 Cooper Union. B. F. A. 1975-77 Rhode Island School of Design
- Known for: Street Artist, Painter
- Website: danwitz.com

Dan Witz (born 1957) is a Brooklyn, NY based street artist and realist painter. He grew up in Chicago, IL, and graduated in 1981 from Cooper Union, on New York City's Lower East Side. Witz, consistently active since the late 1970s, is one of the pioneers of the street art movement.

Dan Witz's paintings have been shown in galleries throughout the US and Europe. In June 2010 a monograph, "Dan Witz. In Plain View. 30 Years of Artworks Illegal and Otherwise", was published by Ginkgo Press.

== Career ==
Dan Witz received a National Endowment of the Arts grant, in 1983, and fellowships from the New York Foundation for the Arts, in 1992 and 2000

In 1983 Dan Witz's first book, "The Birds of Manhattan" was published by Skinny Books. His second book, In Plain View, was released in June 2010, by Gingko Press. In September 2010, Gingko Press will release "Hummingbirds, 2011".

The work of Dan Witz has appeared in Juxtapoz, Time, Arts Magazine, New York Magazine, Sites, Public Art Review, The New York Times, The Daily News, Newsday, The New Yorker, Harpers, and Adbusters. Dan was an early and frequent contributor to the definitive street art website and blog, the Wooster Collective.

Witz's work can be seen in the 2010 Banksy film, Exit Through the Gift Shop. In 2006 the Lou Auguste documentary, Open Air, featured the studios and methods of Dan Witz as well as five other American street artists: Faile, Skewville, Mike De Foe, Espo, and Tiki Jay. His work was also featured in the 2005 film, To Be Seen, by Alice Arnold.

Dan Witz's paintings have been shown in galleries worldwide; including Jonathan LeVine Gallery, in Chelsea, New York; Stolen Space Gallery, London, England; Carmichael Gallery, Los Angeles, CA; Addict Gallery, Paris, France; White Walls, San Francisco, and DFN Gallery New York.

== Recent publications ==
- 2010 "In Plain View: 30 Years of Artworks Illegal and Otherwise" Dan Witz, Introduction by David Lopes, Gingko Press
- 2010 "Hummingbirds 2011" Dan Witz, Gingko Press
- 2010 "Trespass, A History of Uncommissioned Urban Art" Edited by Ethel Seno, in collaboration with Marc and Sara Schiller, Taschen
- 2010 "Stickers, From Punk Rock to Contemporary Art" DB Burkeman/ Monica LoCascio, Rizzoli International Publications, Inc.
- 2010 "Street Art Cook Book, A Guide to Techniques and Materials", Benke Carlsson/ Hop Louie, Dokument Press
- 2010 "Beyond the street" Patrick Nguyen, Stuart Mackenzie, Gestalten
- 2009 "The Thousands, painting outside, breaking in" DRAGO
- 2009 "Untitled II, The Beautiful Renaissance", Gary Shove
- 2008 "Untitled, Street Art in the Counter Culture", Gary Shove
- 2008 "Street Art". Cedar Lewisohn Tate Publishing
- 2007 "Sticker City" Claudia Walde alias MadC
- 2007 "Street Renegades" Francesca Gavin
- 2006 "The Art of Rebellion 2" Christian Hundertmark/ C100
- 2004 "Graffiti World" Nicholas Ganz
- 2003 "I NY New York Street Art" Kelly Burns
- 2002 "Stencil Graffiti" Tristan Manco
- 1985 "Street Art" Allan Schwartzman
