= Millennium Iconoclast Museum of Art =

Contemporary art museum in Brussels, Belgium

Millennium Iconoclast Museum of Art (MIMA)
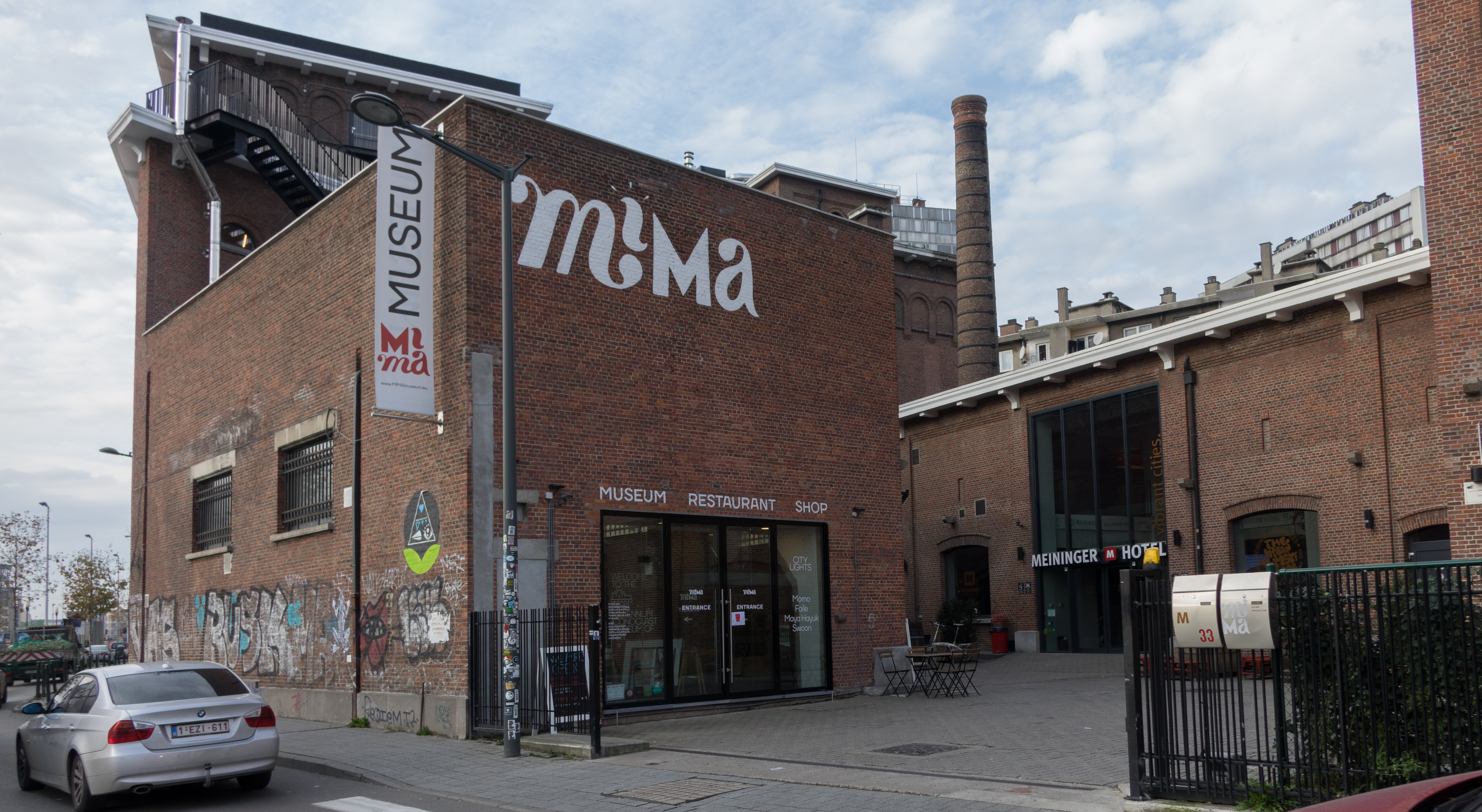
- Exterior of the museum
- Interactive fullscreen map
- Established: 15 April 2016; 10 years ago
- Dissolved: 5 January 2025; 21 months ago
- Location: Quai du Hainaut / Henegouwenkaai 41, 1080 Molenbeek-Saint-Jean, Brussels-Capital Region, Belgium
- Coordinates: 50°51′4″N 4°20′17″E
- Type: Contemporary art
- Director: Raphael Cruyt
- Curator: Alice Van Den Abeele
- Parking: Parking Brunfaut, Rue Fernand Brunfaut / Fernand Brunfautstraat 18, 1080 Brussels
- Website: www.mimamuseum.eu

The Millennium Iconoclast Museum of Art (MIMA) was a contemporary art museum in Molenbeek-Saint-Jean, a municipality of Brussels, Belgium. Privately owned and operated as a non-profit, it was founded in 2016 and housed in the former Belle-Vue Brewery at 41, quai du Hainaut/Henegouwenkaai, along the Brussels–Charleroi Canal. It closed permanently in 2025.

== History ==
Opened on 15 April 2016, the museum was established in the former Belle-Vue Brewery, a four-storey building dating from 1916, located along the Brussels–Charleroi Canal in Molenbeek-Saint-Jean. The museum was privately financed at a cost of €18 million by the developer Jean-Paul Pütz, with contributions of artworks from seven collectors. It operated with an annual budget of around €600,000.

MIMA was directed by Alice van den Abeele and Raphaël Cruyt, who launched the project as a non-profit to address the lack of public contemporary art museums in Belgium. Over the years, the museum hosted 17 exhibitions and welcomed more than 400,000 visitors, showcasing artists such as Momo, FAILE, David Shrigley, Barry McGee, and, in its final exhibition, Vhils. Since 2021, a pedestrian footbridge over the canal has linked the museum directly to the City of Brussels' side, improving access.

Despite earlier plans for expansion, the museum announced its closure in October 2024 after a sudden drop of over 50% in visitor numbers. The decline followed the unexpected closure of the Quai du Hainaut for repairs, cutting off road access to the museum. With the works estimated to last years, MIMA declared its operation "no longer viable". Two planned exhibitions were cancelled, and on 5 January 2025, the museum closed permanently following the final weekend of its Multitude exhibition.

== See also ==
- KANAL – Centre Pompidou
- List of museums in Brussels
- History of Brussels
- Culture of Belgium
