= Malt Island =

Island in Wrocław, Poland

Coordinates: 51°06′58″N 17°02′16″E

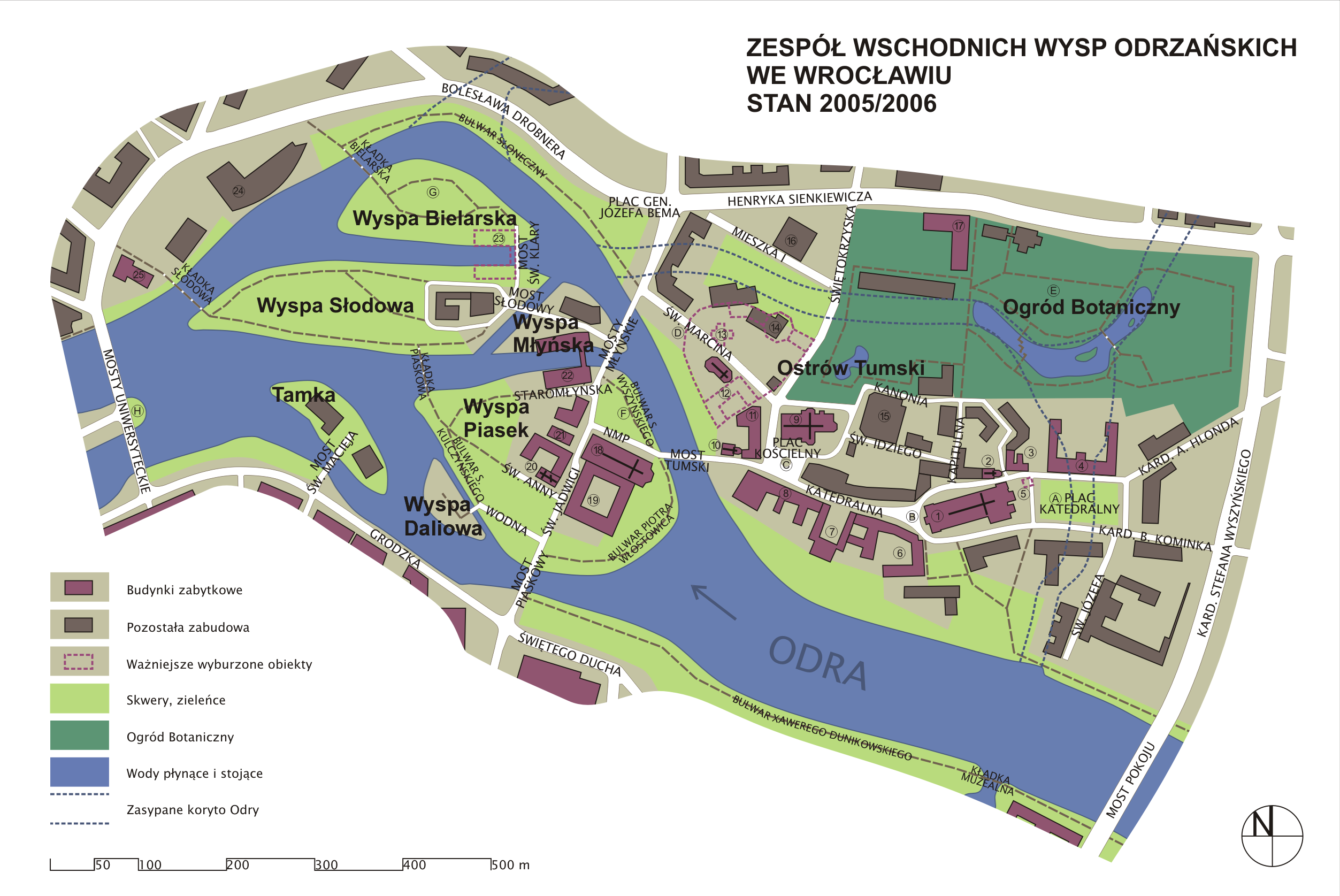
The island, located next to the Sand Island

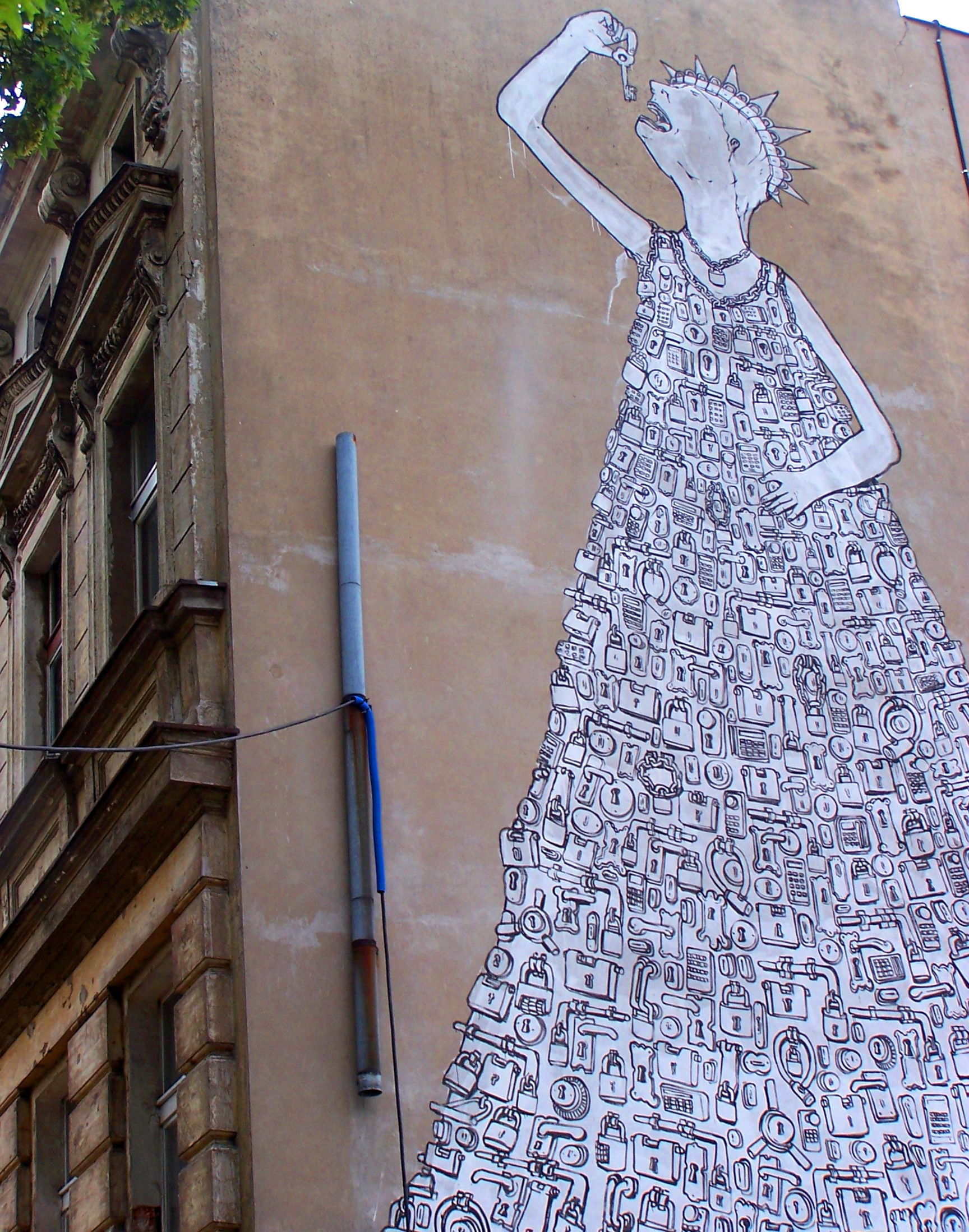
The Statua zniewolenia painting by street artist Blu

The Malt Island (Polish: Wyspa Słodowa, [ˈvɘspa swɔˈdɔva]), also known as the Słodowa Island, is a small islet on the Oder River within the Wrocław Old Town.

The island used to be called Vorderbleiche until 1945. Originally the name came from bleaching linen for the Order of Saint Clare. The island was owned by the Order of Saint Claire from the Middle Ages until the beginning of the 18th century, when it became the property of the city. In the 18th century the Malt Island was connected to Mill and Bielarska Islands with the iron bridge. In the second half of the 19th century, people began to build dwelling houses on it with sewerage systems, phones and electricity. In 1945 the German army installed field artillery there, which made it a target for frequent bombardment during World War II. During the siege of Wrocław at the end of World War II, almost all the buildings of the island were destroyed. There were only some of the buildings left, including the thirteenth-century St. Clare's Mills.

St. Clare's Mills were blown up by sappers in 1975 on the order of Wrocław mayor, Marian Czubiński. The decision was met with widespread criticism and protests by the people of culture, architects, and urban planners. For nearly a quarter century after the destruction of mills, the area remained almost completely undeveloped, with only one house left on the island.

In Polish, Wyspa Słodowa is also the name of the street connecting the Malt Island with the Mill Island, and further with St. Jadwiga Street on the Sand Island. This is why Tumski Hotel uses the address Wyspa Słodowa 10, despite it being located on the Mill Island.

The Malt Island and the neighbouring Sand Island host many cultural events and concerts, especially during the summer season. In has frequently served as a venue for events associated with the Students' Holidays in May. In 2008 the island was one of the venues of the international street art exhibition "External Artists / Out of Sth", during which Italian artist Blu created a mural called "Statue of Enslavement".

On 5 July 2018, the Malt Island was designated as one of five locations in Wrocław where alcohol consumption is allowed in public. It is the only such place in the city centre.
