= Eltono =

French street artist (born 1975)

- Born: 1975 (age 50–51); Paris
- Known for: Public art, Abstract graffiti, Street art, Urban art, Graffiti
- Website: www.eltono.com

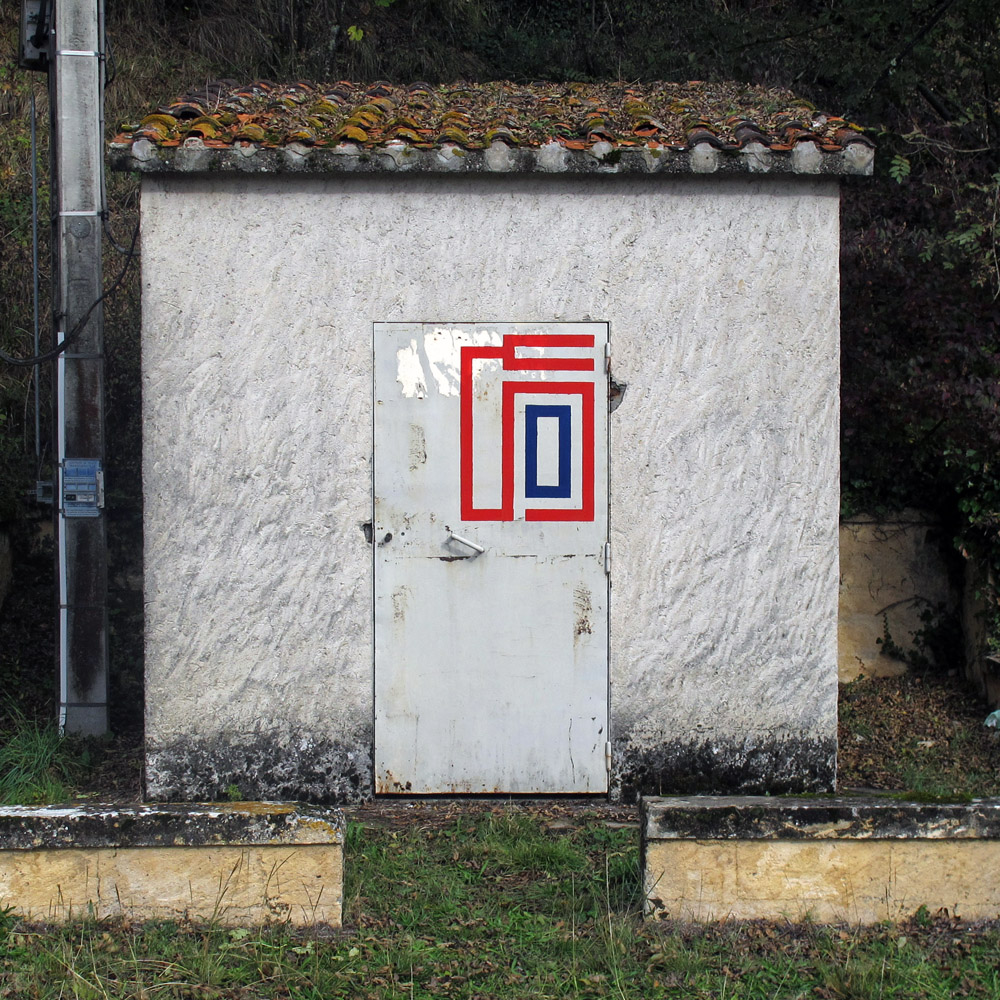
Eltono, France 2014

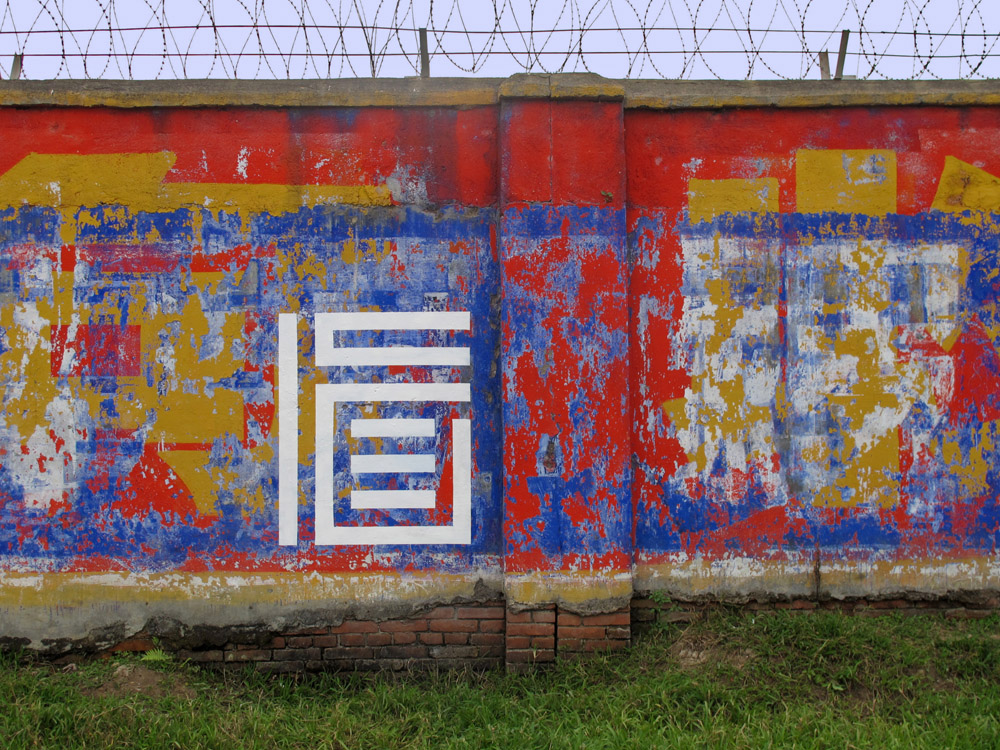
Eltono, Xishuangbanna, China 2013

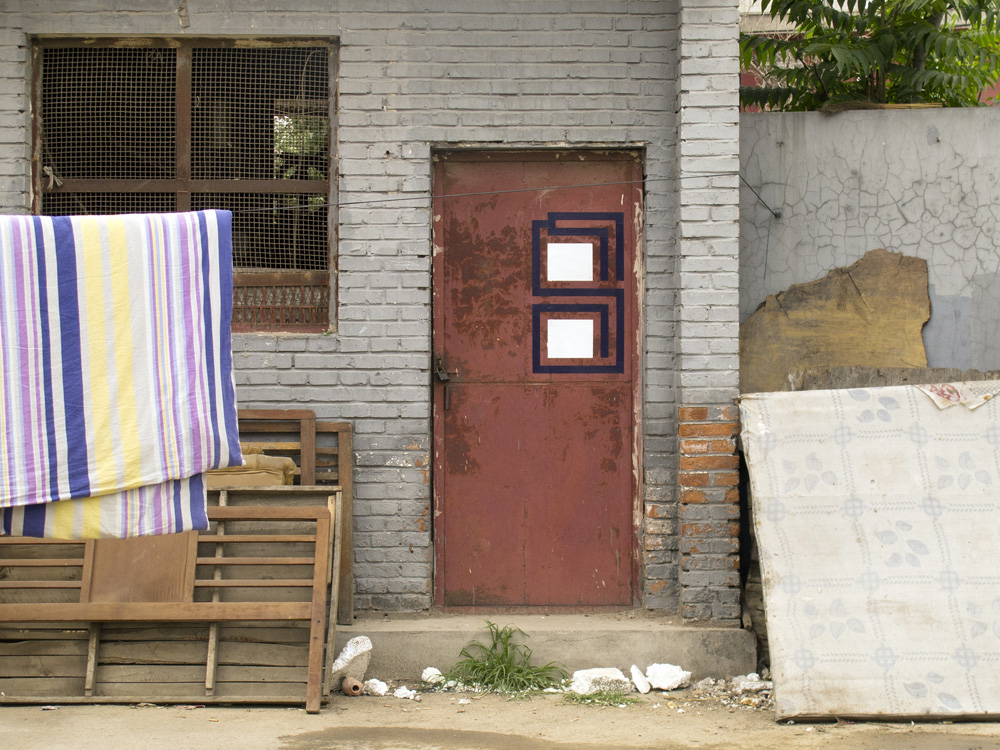
Eltono, Caochangdi, Beijing, China 2012

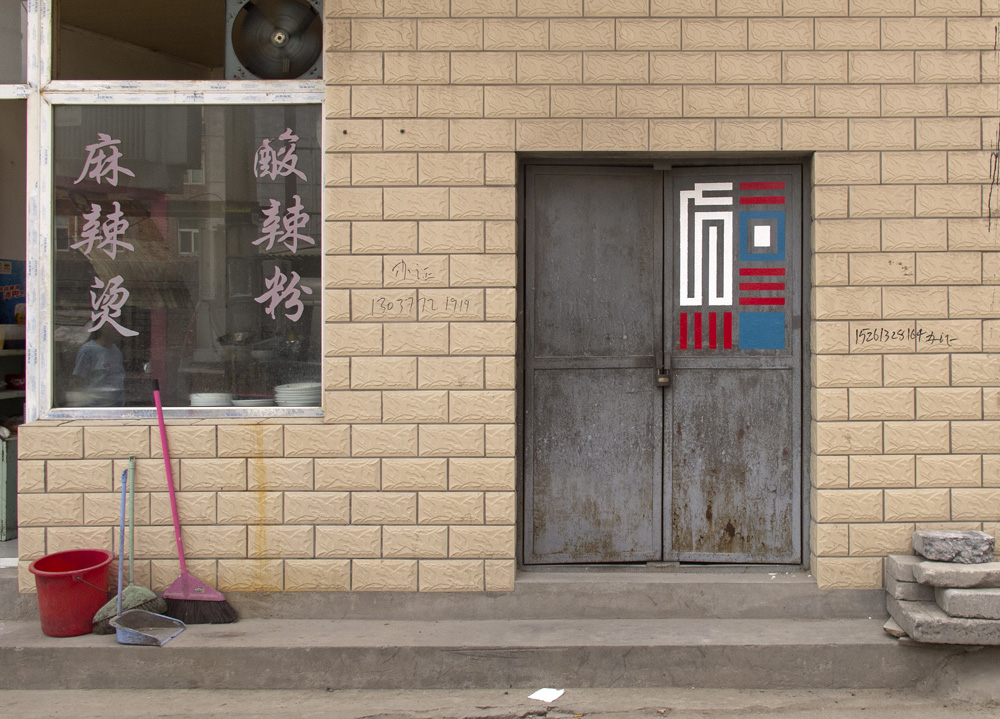
Eltono, Caochangdi, Beijing, China 2012

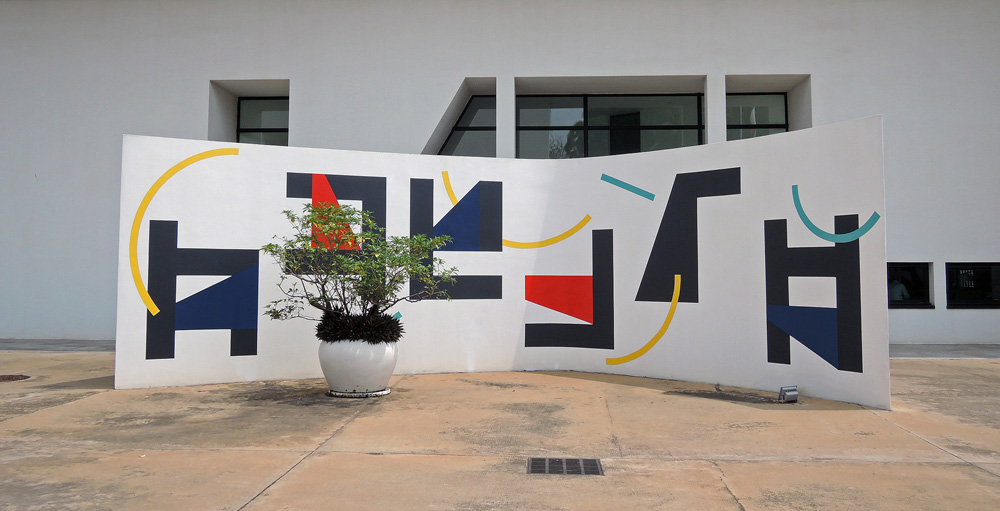
Eltono, French Embassy in Cambodia 2015

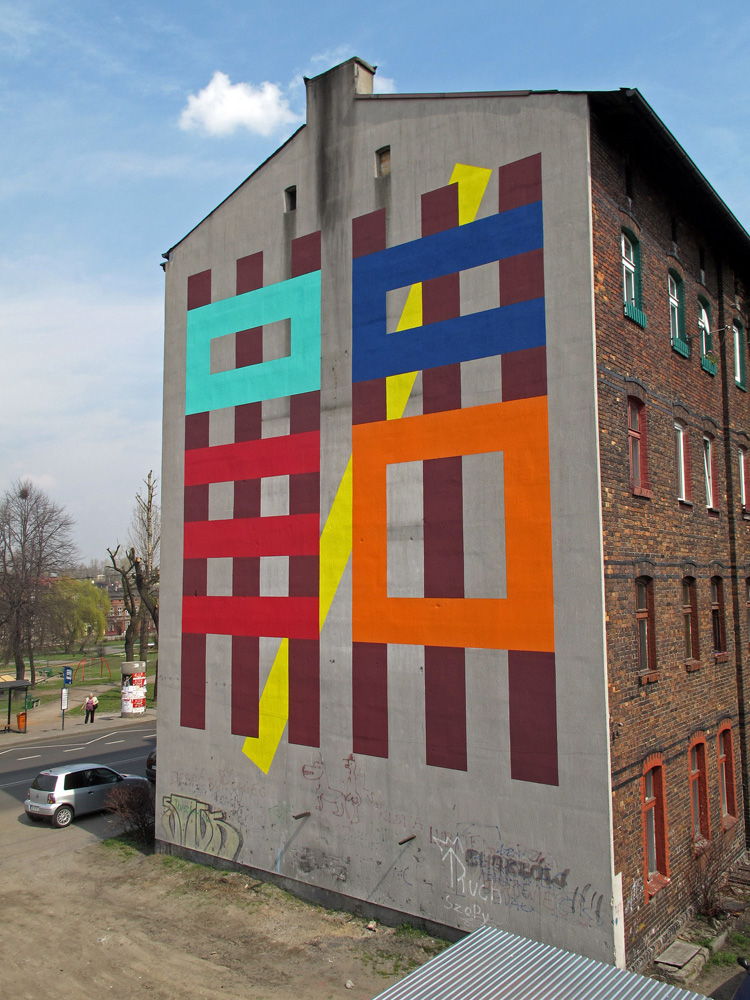
Eltono, Katowice, Poland 2013

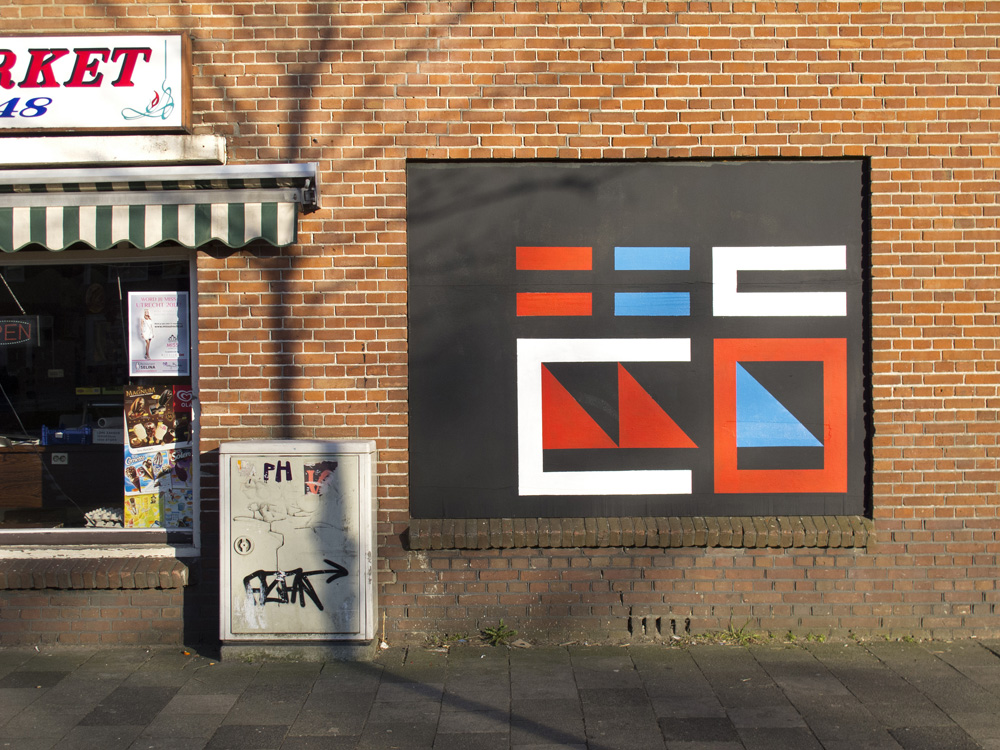
Eltono, Utrecht, NL 2012

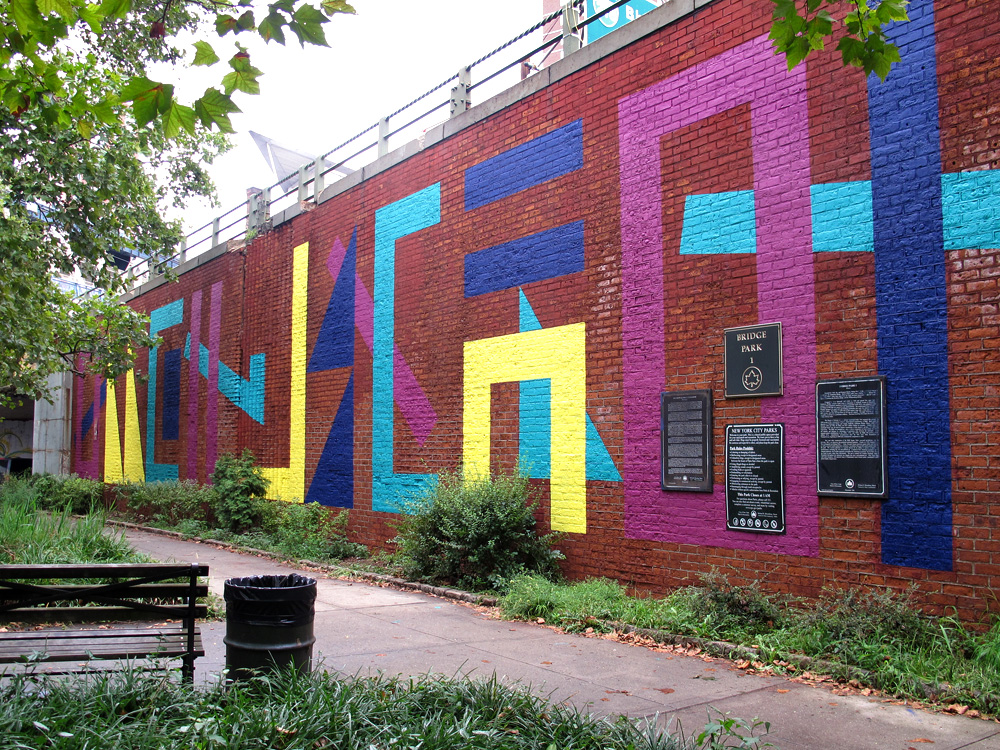
Eltono, Bridge Park 1, Dumbo, NY 2013

Eltono is a French artist born in the suburbs of Paris in 1975. His work is mostly influenced by his graffiti background. He started painting around 1989 in his neighborhood mostly on train tracks and highway walls. "Eltono focused mainly on the railway lines to the northwest of the city, painting in the traditional silver and black, block letter Parisian style." He lived in Madrid from 1999 to 2010 (where he got his pseudonym), then in Beijing from 2010 to 2014 and since 2014 lives in the south of France. In 1999, while living in Madrid, he started painting abstract symbols with tape and acrylic paint. "It was then that he developed the colorful geometric box patterns for which he is now known." "As Eltono himself suggested, his move away from traditional graffiti was produced so as to find a harmony with both the material and the social body of the city (integrating both its architectonic and societal elements in a more consensual manner)." "Eltono also rejects conventional letterforms in favor of a minimalism device with which to negotiate space."

Eltono's work is mainly influenced by the urban environment and questions the limits between public and private space. He uses the term "public space artist" to describe his practice. When showing his work in galleries and museums, he focuses on finding a coherent way to show street art in private spaces. "[Eltono's] career in both the street and the galleries [], is an example of a certain ethic of sustained work, oblivious to everything, which creates its own parameters and builds its own audience."

He has collaborated with artists such as MOMO (artist), Nuria Mora (http://nuriamora.com/), Luce and is part of the Equipo Plástico art collective (alongside Nuria Mora, Nano4814 and Sixeart) and Noviciado9 (alongside 3ttman, Remed, Spok, Nano4814 and Luciano Suarez).

== Solo exhibitions (selection) ==
- 10/2002 — Complémentaires, Vacío 9, Madrid, Spain
- 01/2006 — (x, y, z), Vacío9, Madrid, Spain
- 11/2006 — Eigenkunstruktion, Artitude, Berlin, Germany
- 10/2007 — Eltono at ART, Monterrey, Mexico
- 06/2008 — Astillas, La Culpable, Lima, Peru
- 07/2008 — Bermellón, ROJO artspace, Barcelona, Spain
- 09/2008 — PLAF – Autonomous Mechanisms, New York, U.S.A.
- 01/2009 — Coriandoli, Cripta747, Turin, Italy
- 01/2009 — Pubblico, ROJO artspace, Milan, Italy
- 05/2010 — Retícula, Delimbo Gallery, Seville, Spain
- 10/2011 — Eredu, SC Gallery, Bilbao, Spain
- 06/2012 — 1/1, C-Space gallery, Caochangdi, Beijing, China
- 07/2012 — Deambular, Artium Museum, Vitoria, Spain
- 03/2014 — Amalgama, Slowtrack, Madrid, Spain
- 06/2015 — Incontrôlables, Instituto Cervantes de Paris, Paris, France
- 10/2015 — Aléas, Delimbo, Seville, Spain
- 11/2015 — Lugares Comunes, Set Espai d'Art, Valencia, Spain

== Collective shows (selection) ==
- 06/2002 — Coded Language, Atlanta, USA
- 09/2002 — Liverpool Biennial, Liverpool, England
- 09/2003 — Ill Communication, Urbis Museum, Manchester, England
- 01/2006 — 1st Art Biennial Foundation ONCE, Madrid, Spain
- 09/2006 — Pintura Mutante, Marco Museum, Vigo, Spain
- 01/2007 — Privé Och Público, Göteborg, Sweden
- 03/2008 — Nomadaz, Scion Gallery, Los Angeles, USA
- 05/2008 — Street Art, Tate Modern Museum, London, England
- 05/2009 — Observatori 2009, Valencia, Spain
- 02/2010 — Murals, Fundación Miró, Barcelona, Spain
- 09/2012 — Biennale d’Art Contemporain du Havre, Le Havre, France
- 08/2013 — Wooster Collective 10th Anniversary Show, Jonathan LeVine Gallery, New York, USA
- 09/2014 — Artmossphere Biennial, Moscow, Russia
- 01/2015 — Mapping The City, Somerset House, London, England
- 04/2015 — Oxymores, Ministry of Culture, Paris, France
- 07/2015 — Arqueologia Prohibida, Conde Duque, Madrid, Spain

== Bibliography ==
- Ornament & Order: Graffiti, Street Art and the Parergon, Rafael Schacter, Ashgate (U.K.) - ISBN 9781472409980
- The World Atlas of Street Art and Graffiti, Rafael Schacter, Yale University Press (U.S.A.) - ISBN 9780300199420
- Line and Surface, Monographic book, Stickit (N.L.) - ISBN 9789081841801
- Urban Maps, Instruments of Narrative and Interpretation in the City, Richard Brook and Nick Dunn, Ashgate (U.K.) - ISBN 9780754676577
- We Own the Night: The Art of the Underbelly Project, Workhorse and PAC, Rizzoli (U.S.A.) - ISBN 9780789324948
- Trespass, Taschen (U.S.A.) - ISBN 9783836509640
- Durch die Augen in den Sinn, Galerie Konkret (Germany) - ISBN 978-3940418401
- Urban Interventions, Personal Projects in Public Spaces, Gestalten (Germany) - ISBN 9783899552911
- Arte Emergente en España – Emerging Art in Spain, Manuela Villa, Vaiven (Spain) - ISBN 9788496592643
- Abstract Graffiti, Cedar Lewisohn, Merrell Publishers - ISBN 1858945267
- Puerta Lumbreras – Eltono, Documental book about the project, Puerto Lumbreras (Spain)
- Bar Tom Cruise, Monographic book, Ediciones Rojo (Spain) - ISBN 9788461113996
- The Art of Rebellion II (Germany) - ISBN 9783980990943
- Carnet de rue, JR, Free presse (France) - ISBN 9782915573015
- Graffiti World, Thames & Hudson (Germany) - ISBN 9780500514696
- Street Logos, Thames & Hudson (U.K.) - ISBN 9780500284698
- The Art of Rebellion (Germany) - ISBN 9781584232094
