= Art in the Streets =

Art in the Streets was an exhibition held at the Museum of Contemporary Art Los Angeles from April 17 to August 8, 2011. Curated by its then-director Jeffrey Deitch and associate curators Aaron Rose and Roger Gastman, it surveyed the development of graffiti and global street art from the 1970s to the present, covering the cities of New York City, the West Coast, London, and São Paulo with a focus on Los Angeles. It was supposed to travel to the Brooklyn Museum from March 30 to July 8, 2012. The exhibit at the Brooklyn Museum was cancelled because of financial difficulties.

By some estimates, it was the most attended exhibition in the MOCA LA's history.

Artists in the exhibition included: Barry McGee, Lee Quiñones, Os Gêmeos, Banksy, Shepard Fairey, TAKI 183, Jean-Michel Basquiat, Chaz Bojórquez, ROA, JR, RISK, Rammellzee, Keith Haring, Kenny Scharf, Angel Ortiz, Gusmano Cesaretti and others.

In early December 2010 Italian street artist Blu painted a mural on the side of the museum's Geffen Contemporary Wing to coincide with the exhibition. Because the work's antiwar theme might be deemed offensive, the museum had it painted over within a day, and anonymous fellow artists avenged themselves by putting up posters of Deitch as an ayatollah holding a paint roller.
