= Lucart =

Italian paper manufacturing company

Lucart S.p.A.
- Industry: paper
- Founded: 1953; 73 years ago
- Headquarters: Porcari, Italy, ITA
- Area served: Worldwide
- Products: products in paper
- Revenue: ▲€ 717 millons (fiscal year 2022)
- Website: www.lucartgroup.com

Lucart S.p.A. is an Italian paper manufacturing company. It is based in Porcari, within the Lucca paper district.

== Timeline ==
In 1953, the brothers Tarcisio, Fernando, Eliseo, Alessandro and Raffaello Pasquini founded in Villa Basilica a paper-making company called Cartiera Lucchese of the Pasquini Brothers, dedicated to the manufacture of monogloss paper for flexible packaging.

The company expanded in 1966 and moved to Porcari.

At the end of the last few years the group headed to the health market. In 1988, the Diecimo plan was acquired, dedicated to the production of this paper and its transformation (hygienic paper, kitchen napkins, servilletas, hand towels). Five years later, the company also expanded to France, from where Cartiera Lucchese France was founded: the company had the objective of managing French customers.

In 1998, the commercial company Lucart Ibérica y Lucart France sas (factory in Troyes) was founded.

In 2007, Fato Professional srl was founded, a company that took over the management of Fato Italia srl, leading manufacturer of colored and decorated manteles and servilletas for the Ho.re.ca market.

In 2008 it consolidated its presence in the French market with the acquisition of the tisú branch of Novacare s.a. with the Laval-sur-Vologne plant completely dedicated to the production of articles for the AFH market (outside the house).

In 2009, the Lucchese Cartiera Group changed its name to the Lucart Group. The following year, the first plant was built that allows the production of 100% ecological paper from cellulose fibers from Tetra Pak containers.

In 2012, it acquired the Italian factories of the American Georgia-Pacific in Castelnuovo Garfagnana and Avigliano and the Tenderly and Tutto brands. At the same time, Georgia-Pacific Italia srl changes its company name to Airtissue srl.

Since April 1, 2013, all the Italian companies of the group have merged into a single company called Lucart spa.

In 2016, the Group acquired the assets of the Hungarian company Bokk Paper KFt. and renames the acquired company to Lucart Kft.

In 2018, the Group acquired, through the subsidiary Lucart Iberica S.L.U., the company CEL Technologies S.L.U. in Spain and renamed it to Lucart Tissue & Soap S.L.U.

In 2021, the Group acquired, through the parent company Lucart Spa, 100% of the share capital of the British ESP Ltd (Essential Supply Products Ltd).

In 2021, Lucart will found, together with CPR System, a new subsidiary company called Newpal Spa which will deal with the printing and marketing of recycled plastic pallets deriving from the recovery of Tetra Pak type beverage cartons.

== Business ==
The group produces low-weight paper for flexible packaging and tissue products in pure cellulose and deinked paper, with the Lucart Professional, Grazie, Tenderly, Tutto, Fato, Velo, Smile logo or for private labels. It also produces raw materials for the paper industry (bags, gift papers, papers to be laminated with polyethylene and aluminium). It is the leading European producer of thin MG paper for flexible packaging and among the top ten of paper for hygienic use.
