= Gaia (artist) =

American painter

Gaia (born 1988 in New York City) is an American street artist who has received significant museum showings and critical recognition. Based in Baltimore, he has created large-scale murals worldwide to engage the community where he works in a dialogue by using historical and sociological references to these neighborhoods.

== Early life and education ==
Gaia was born as Andrew Pisacane in 1988 in New York City and raised on the Upper East Side of Manhattan. His artist name, Gaia, is derived from the Greek designation for "earth goddess," a deity that is the personification of Earth. Early in his career he created murals on derelict buildings, alleys, and abandoned billboards that depicted his fear of global warming, frequently using animal imagery to blend nature in with the urban landscapes. In 2007, while still in high school in New York, Gaia started wheat-pasting prints of his linoleum blocks in Bushwick, Williamsburg and Chelsea. He participated in several successful shows in Bushwick at Ad Hoc Art.

=== Baltimore ===
After graduating from high school in June 2007, Gaia moved to Baltimore and studied for four years at the Maryland Institute College of Art (MICA), where he broadened his iconography. For example, he included images of his grandfather, or a rooster holding the head of St. John the Baptist. He graduated in 2011 from MICA.

External videos
- You can watch a video of Gaia creating one of his art works in Baltimore here.

Gaia also developed an interest in the evolution of urban neighborhoods. He began incorporating portraits of influential, and sometimes controversial urban developers: people such as Nelson Rockefeller, Robert Moses, Henry Flagler, James Rouse, Le Corbusier and Mies van der Rohe. These men built highways, skyscrapers and housing projects and collectively and irrevocably, they altered our perception of public space. For this reason, Gaia layered them into his urban murals.

== Career ==
According to the artist himself, much of his early work was inspired by a sense of looming environmental calamity. In 2011, he stated that, "I wanted to express this strange unlocatable feeling of fear about the end of the world - my generation’s zeitgeist of global warming."

=== 2011 ===
In March 2011 Gaia had two solo exhibitions in Chicago co-organized by Maxwell-Colette Gallery and Pawnworks, which included a large-scale installation in the Art Loop at Adams and State.

In May 2011, the Jonathan LeVine Gallery in New York City presented Succession, a solo exhibition of Gaia's work.

In the summer, Gaia created an edition of a raven titled Forevermore and donated prints of it to the Edgar Allan Poe House and Museum in Baltimore, which had lost its funding. The Poe House is located in an area which includes subsidized housing. He also made a double-copy mural of the work nearby Poe Homes low-income housing projects.

When a 50 foot-poster of Gaia's image was wheat-pasted in the neighborhood, it became a photo-op location for local residents. The image was also hung at Case[werks] Showroom & Gallery, for its own fundraising event.

In September 2011, Gaia was commissioned to create a mural for Wynwood Doors for Art Basel/Miami. He chose to do a portrait of Henry Flagler, a railroad magnate who established the historically black neighborhood Overtown in central Miami.

Gaia was one of the artists that took part in The Underbelly Project which exhibited at Art Basel/Miami.

=== 2012 ===
Gaia curated Open Walls Baltimore (OWB) which was backed by the PNC Community Foundation and a grant from the National Endowment for the Arts. The mayor of Baltimore, Stephanie Rawlings-Blake, attended the March 6 launch party for the OWB project at The Windup Space.

Gaia created the first two murals for Open Walls Baltimore at the corner of Charles and North Avenue. Maya Hayuk created the third mural, and other artists who participated were Swoon, Chris Stain, MOMO, Freddy Sam, Jaz, Jetsonoarma, Overunder, Vhils, Nanook, Mata Ruda, Specter, Interesni Kaski, Ever, Doodles, John Ahearn and Sten & Lex. In addition, discussion events included Monica Campana of Living Walls and Jane Golden of Philadelphia Mural Arts.

These artists were invited to create public murals in the Station North Arts and Entertainment District as part of the Open Walls Baltimore grant that aimed to make the area an arts destination for a transitional neighborhood that houses both young artists who attend the nearby Maryland Institute College of Art, and low-income long-term residents.

In September Gaia was invited to create a large installation at the Baltimore Museum of Art Contemporary Wing which reopened on November 17 after having been closed for several years for a major renovation. The project explored a recurring Gaia theme focusing on the residents of a neighborhood located near the BMA known as Remington. Eleven portraits of Remington residents float on a huge linoleum block print of rowhouses on one wall. On the opposite wall is another linoleum block print of rowhouses on which Gaia created a Gauguin-inspired portrait of a woman holding a mango. Kristen Hileman, the museum's curator of contemporary art, said the museum sought to commission an installation by Gaia not only because of his artistic skills, but because of the social and political messages in his work and his mission to connect people in urban landscapes.

=== 2013 ===
South African street artist Freddy Sam hosted Gaia, Know Hope and Jaz in January to create murals in Johannesburg and Cape Town. Gaia was also invited to participate in mural festivals in Montreal, Bushwick, Richmond, Rochester, Sheboygan and Vladivostok. Rice Gallery at Rice University, Houston, Texas which specializes in site-specific installations presented a solo exhibition titled Marshland for Gaia from September 26 through December 8 and commissioned a documentary film.

External videos
- You can watch a 7 minute documentary on Gaia's exhibition at the Rice University Art Gallery here.

=== 2014 ===
In February Gaia participated in the 2014 Pow Wow Hawaii mural festival in Honolulu. Gaia was invited to create a mural and a painting whose images referenced Hawaii's pre-colonial culture. Andrew Hosne of Thinkspace was enlisted by event director Jasper Wong to curate an exhibit for the participants'paintings at the Honolulu Museum of Art School, titled Pow! Wow! Exploring the New Contemporary Art Movement.

After returning from Hawaii, Gaia went to work on curating the second Open Walls Baltimore festival in the Station North Arts District where he created his own mural on the side of a Korean rice cake factory on N Charles Street. There was some controversy with regard to the community reception and the under representation of female artists.

Once Open Wall Baltimore 2 was underway, Gaia left for Perth, Australia to participate in a street art mural event called Public organized by the not-for-profit, Form.

Gaia was also commissioned to create a mural for an event called Year of Altruism. This event in Greenville, SC coincides with the 75th anniversary of Kristallnacht, often seen as the beginning of the Holocaust. The proposed design, with references to textile mills and a landscape with lilies, is meant to recognize the generosity of the altruistic people involved in the textile industry.

In 2014, Gaia was also commissioned to paint a mural of Vincent Chin, along the Grand River Creative Corridor in Detroit. However, a local artist Sintex buffed (painted over) Gaia's black and white mural with a set of images to honor varied civil rights icons, including Chin.

=== 2015 ===
In 2015, Gaia was named to the Forbes 30 Under 30 list for Art & Style.

He was commissioned to create a mural installation at the Center for Civil and Human Rights in Atlanta, GA focusing on the hashtag #iftheygunnedmedown in response to how blacks are perceived in the media following the death of Mike Brown in Ferguson.

The W Hotel, DC, also commissioned Gaia to create murals inside their new restaurant Pinea.

999Contemporary mounted a solo exhibition for the artist in Rome where he also created a mural for a public project in the Tormarancia neighborhood.

Gaia was invited to speak on the Evolution of Street Art on a panel at the Philadelphia Museum of Art.

The artist curated and painted murals at the 2015 O+ Festival in Kingston, NY on October 9–11.

Gaia also had an installation at York College of Pennsylvania Galleries titled Perspectives on Peace. The artist interviewed four local residents to create a video of each which was shown in the center of the octagonal gallery with enlarged portraits of each painted on the perimeter walls. He will also participate in a panel discussion on October 14 with the curators prior to a reception.

=== 2016-17 ===
999Contemporary commissioned Gaia to execute a major mural commission at the Hotel Capannelle in Rome. The three murals titled "Mobility" cover the entire four story exterior of the hotel.

Gaia also worked on a three-story triptych soaring up a staircase from the Bellevue, Washington, W hotel entrance. The murals took 18 days to paint and were completed one week before the hotel's official June 15, 2017, grand opening.

Gaia collaborated on a mammoth Guache five-story triptych in the central hall of the Biblioteca Nacional de Colombia, Bogota, to celebrate the 50th anniversary of publication of Gabriel Garcia Marquez's prize winning novel One Hundred Years of Solitude.

Gaia also worked on the stART- Welcome to Pisa project in Italy. This was another 18 days of work on a scaffold. The mural covers the exterior wall of the Saint Gobain glass factory and depicts and reflects upon the history of labor in Italy (and the world) and the environmental impacts from automation.

In this period, Gaia was also part of a group of international contemporary street artists who were commissioned to pain New Delhi's streets in India. Gaia's paintings focused on Global Warming, and in particular the impact of low cost automobiles as well as container ships on the environment.

Between these mural projects, a new hotel—the Sagamore Pendry in Gaia's hometown of Baltimore—commissioned the muralist to create a painting on canvas for their lobby lounge. The 10' x 12' canvas titled "The Hardest Needle to Thread" that Gaia delivered now hangs in the hotel's lunge and depicts a piece of Baltimore history with the image of Francis Scott Key and the hands of two women (one white and the other black) sewing the flag which flew over Fort McHenry during the War of 1812.

=== 2021 ===
In 2021, with funding from PRHBTN, Gaia painted a mural of Sweet Evening Breeze entitled Mother Of Us All at 161 North Limestone in Lexington, KY. The mural is based on a photo of the same name by John Ashley, taken in 1972, from the collection of the Faulkner Morgan Archive.

== Critical reception ==
Gaia has been an identified as a rising star in the art world, with solo exhibitions in New York City; Los Angeles; Washington, D.C.; Chicago; San Francisco; Miami; Baltimore; and Seoul, Korea.

In 2008, The New York Times announced that "among the names you’ll see again and again these days is Gaia...he’s an artist-of-the-moment, and prints of his that were for sale at a recent exhibition at Ad Hoc Art in Bushwick sold out."

The Baltimore Sun declared him a "critically acclaimed emerging artist with gallery shows in Chicago, New York and Washington and street art from Madrid to Seoul." The Baltimore Sun also noted that "Gaia never loses his playfulness or spontaneity," and hailed his "evolution into pieces that connect deeply to a defined city area. Even the transcendental figures take on new meaning."

Grist Magazine hailed Gaia's arrival "into the inner sanctum of the art world. Galleries from Washington, D.C., to Chicago, San Francisco, and L.A. have exhibited his work. In September, he spent several weeks in Miami, contributing a mural to Wynwood Walls."

Urbanite Magazine noted that Gaia's art can be found in cities from San Francisco to Seoul, Korea. He has had numerous gallery shows exhibiting both his street art and his studio work. His prolific pace and sophisticated execution have earned him a spot in a recent anthology titled Beyond the Street: The 100 Leading Figures in Urban Art. His success is such that he is now straddling the line between street artist and gallery art star."

Our Urban Times predicted that Gaia "will no doubt be part of the art establishment of tomorrow."

Kristen Hileman, curator of contemporary art at the Baltimore Museum of Art, said "This is an artist who wasn’t just tagging things and doing a quick hit in an urban site," Hileman says. "This is a person engaged with the health of the city as an ecosystem and wanting to see the abandoned buildings of Baltimore used for a better purpose than they were." She says that Gaia has the self-awareness to know that part of his role as an artist is to, like Gauguin, live in a culture that really isn't his own.

At the same time, Gaia has sometimes been criticized by local graffiti artists for flying in from out-of-town, without detailed knowledge of the local community.
