= Porcari =

- Comune
- Comune di Porcari
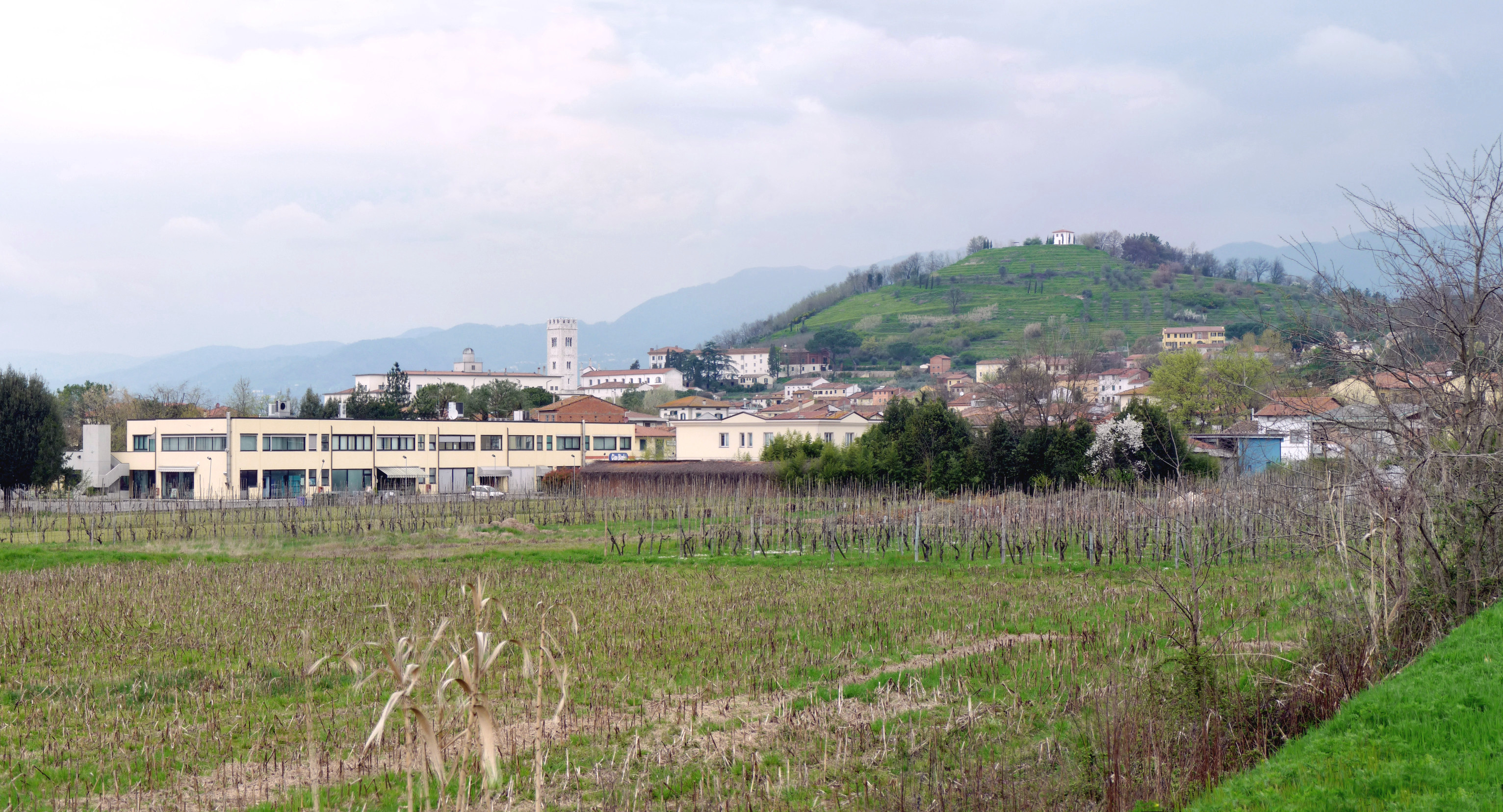

- Coat of arms

- Location within Italy Location within Tuscany
- Coordinates: 43°50′N 10°37′E
- Country: Italy
- Region: Tuscany
- Province: Lucca (LU)
- Frazioni: Rughi, Padule, La Fratina

Government
  - Mayor: Alberto Baccini

Area
  - Total: 17.9 km^{2} (6.9 sq mi)
- Elevation: 32 m (105 ft)

Population (1 June 2011)
  - Total: 8,753
  - Density: 489/km^{2} (1,270/sq mi)
- Demonym: Porcaresi
- Time zone: UTC+1 (CET)
  - Summer (DST): UTC+2 (CEST)
- Postal code: 55016
- Dialing code: 0583
- Patron saint: St. Justus
- Saint day: Monday after Pentecost
- Website: Official website

Porcari is a comune (municipality) in the Province of Lucca in the Italian region Tuscany, located about 50 kilometres (31 mi) west of Florence and about 8 kilometres (5 mi) east of Lucca.

In the Middle Ages it was a stage on the Via Francigena. It houses the church of St. Justus, dating to the 16th century but later mostly remade in neo-medieval style.

== Economy ==
- Lucart, paper manufacturing company
