= The Influencers =

- Genre: Guerrilla communication, Graffiti, Visual arts, Film.
- Dates: beginning of February
- Locations: Barcelona, Spain
- Years active: 2004 - present
- Website: https://theinfluencers.org/

The Influencers is a festival that mixes art, guerrilla communication and radical entertainment. It is curated by Bani Brusadin, Eva & Franco Mattes. In 2012, one of the guests was the Russian art collective Voina.
