= FAILE (artist collaboration) =

American graffiti artists

- Born: Patrick McNeil (born 1975, Edmonton, Alberta) and Patrick Miller (born 1976, Minneapolis, Minnesota); Inception 1999
- Known for: Public art, Street art, Stenciling, Installation art, Printmaking
- Notable work: Deluxx Fluxx, Bedtime Stories, The Wolf Within
- Website: www.faile.net

FAILE (Pronounced "fail") is a Brooklyn-based artistic collaboration between Patrick McNeil (born 1975) and Patrick Miller (born 1976). Since its inception in 1999, FAILE has been known for a wide-ranging multimedia practice recognizable for its explorations of duality through a fragmented style of appropriation and collage.

While painting and printmaking remain central to their approach, over the past decade FAILE has adapted its signature mass culture-driven iconography to an array of materials and techniques, from wooden boxes and window pallets to more traditional canvas, prints, sculptures, stencils, installation, and prayer wheels. FAILE's work is constructed from found visual imagery, and blurs the line between "high" and "low" culture, but recent exhibitions demonstrate an emphasis on audience participation, a critique of consumerism, and the incorporation of religious media, architecture, and site-specific/archival research into their work.

== Biographical ==
McNeil was born in 1975 in Edmonton, Alberta; Miller was born in 1976 in Minneapolis, Minnesota. McNeil and Miller met during their youth in Arizona. Separated in 1996 when Miller remained in art school in Minneapolis and McNeil continued to New York, by the end of the decade, the duo reconnected and, with the addition of then artist Aiko Nakagawa (born 1975, Tokyo, JP), "A Life" was conceived. By early 2000, the trio contributed to the emergence of a nascent street art culture by circulating their screenprinted and painted work on city streets, usually using the subversive processes of wheatpasting and stenciling. During the ensuing years McNeil, Miller, and Nakagawa solidified both their omnivorous style of pop-cultural collage, and changed their name to FAILE (an anagram of A Life). Nakagawa left FAILE in 2006, gaining success in her own right as AIKO aka Lady Aiko, while McNeil and Miller continued on to increased commercial and institutional visibility.

== Career ==
=== Early years: 2000-2005 ===
If FAILE's career can be viewed on a spectrum of "street art" and DIY-products to gallery-ready "fine art," then the first half of the aughts tilts more fully towards street practice. Although FAILE has always shown in galleries in one form or another, and still puts work on the street, these early years were spent deploying work in cities around the world and honing a distinctive style of wheatpasted and stenciled work that recalls both the shredded commodity collage of midcentury décollagistes Mimmo Rotella and Jacques Villeglé, and the pulp-cultural appropriations and comic books sensibilities of sixties "pop" artists such as Richard Hamilton, Andy Warhol, and Roy Lichtenstein. These influences were intensified in FAILE's work by the rapid fire splicing and re-assemblage of sampling, and the direct-to-audience urban raids specific to the golden age of graffiti.

Although FAILE's style can be located in these art historical legacies, their style and idiosyncratic vernacular make FAILE's work distinct and recognizable. During the early years of their career, influenced by contemporaries Shepard Fairey, BAST, and WK Interact, FAILE generated both a process of assemblage and urban circulation, and consistent visual cues and themes. One such example is the Challenger space shuttle, which crashed shortly after its launch in 1986. Not only does the shuttle appear in various forms in much of FAILE's work, the year "1986" is appended to their pieces as a signature that both invokes their specific use of the shuttle image, and also a reminder to their audience of the event itself, of its role in their personal history. "1986" is both indicative of a populist or dialogic impulse in much of FAILE's work, and also an example of the characteristic ambivalence or dualism in their practice. Recurring themes of binaries such as love/hate, peace/war, triumph/calamity, satiation/desire are all prevalent in work that seems to assimilate the global urban landscape but tenders only oblique opinions about that landscape.

During this period, FAILE produced several books in limited edition, including, by 2004, Orange, Death, Boredom, and Lavender. The overlap between FAILE's art practice and design background was pronounced during this early period, and found them collaborating on clothing and shoe lines (including Paper Denim, Comme des Garcons, and Pro-Keds), and music projects, as well as work on the street. In 2004 McNeil reflected, "A lot of what inspires us and excites us is the opportunity to work with talented people and to work on projects that are a challenge. Having the chance to work on things of all different disciplines whether it is fashion, painting, shoe design, or making a toy. The ideas of getting locked in and known for one thing and having to repeat. It sounds like a dreadful situation to be in. Recently we got the opportunity to work on the new Duran Duran album with John Warwicker for Tomato."

This first phase of FAILE's career was markedly experimental and varied—constant travel, a lack of studio space, and a rapidly evolving process meant that work was made for (and usually at) specific sites, from Manhattan to London and Tokyo. Commercial projects helped to finance this period of dissemination and revision. By 2005, however, FAILE acquired a permanent studio space, and were able to commit fully to a more studio-driven practice that both adapted the entropic street aesthetic of FAILE's and others' work, and permitted FAILE to apply their practice to a wider array of media and socio-political themes.

=== Spank the Monkey (2006) ===
From 27 September 2006 to 7 January 2007, independent curator Pedro Alonszo's Spank the Monkey ran at the BALTIC Centre for Contemporary Art in Gateshead, UK. The exhibition brought together twenty two internationally recognized street artists and investigated street art's growing artistic quality and popular appeal (particularly in the United Kingdom) and its rootedness in the realms of graphic design and global youth culture. The exhibition included celebrated "fine artists" such as Barry McGee, Takashi Murakami, and Ryan McGinness alongside noted graffiti, street, and design artists such as Os Gemeos, Shepard Fairey, Banksy, and FAILE. Spank the Monkey was the first exhibition of its kind, and followed closely behind the commercial success of Fairey's Obey line, and Banksy's "Barely Legal" sale of his own work in Los Angeles.

The exhibition, which positioned works both inside the gallery and throughout Newcastle, received favorable reviews. Speaking of the show, critic Guy Bird noted that "when the gallery takes the art seriously, avoiding condescension, or over-glamorisation, and the artists avoid 'sell-out' accusations by keeping control of their message...the results can be spectacular." Spank the Monkey marked both the gradual institutional acceptance of street art, and FAILE's regular display in high-profile fine-art institutions. Indeed, FAILE used the venue to display some of their most somber work to date, in a series of twelve paintings titled "War Profitees," that incorporated harrowing photographs, newspaper text, and a dark color palette to bring to life the tragic 2006 Lebanon War, which killed 1,500 people, most of whom were civilians. The invocation of political violence, and references to Israel and Hezbollah indicated an intensification of FAILE's work, and demonstrated how their technique could be brought to bear on the precarious global order of the 21st century. The integration of form and content in the work, and sustained, critical attention to a political theme evident in FAILE's Spank the Monkey contribution was a harbinger.

=== Tate Modern (2008) ===
In response to the growing popularity—and commercial viability—of street art, the Tate Modern, located in London's Southwark, organized a show simply titled Street Art, that took place from 23 May to 25 August 2008, one week after Banksy's Cans show in a London railway tunnel. The exhibition, organized by curator Cedar Lewisohn, displayed work by six artists or collaborative projects in massive relief on the riverfront-facing wall of the museum's turbine room. Street Art included Nunca and Os Gemeos from Brazil, Blu from Italy, Sixeart from Spain, and JR from France. FAILE was the only group to participate in both the Cans and the Tate shows, contributing to the latter a massive 240-square-foot (22 m^{2}) image of a Native American in full regalia amidst a shredded collage of pulp images and found signage typical of FAILE's work in 2008, and constructed in pieces in the studio before being affixed to the Tate's exterior. Of the exhibition and the institutionalization of their work, FAILE argued "At least it's no longer undermined as something on the street, something without value. Money fuels interest—it's an injection in the butt that fires people up and makes them realise they should pay attention."

While street art was, by 2008, an increasingly accepted and popular form overseas, in New York, graffiti's traditional home, street art was embraced by only a handful of galleries, such as Deitch Projects, an early champion of sometimes FAILE collaborator Swoon. As FAILE noted at the time, "New York has such a history of this art, but institutions are waiting to see what happens before they open the doors to it. The art is starting to surface in New York Sotheby's and Christie's, but it wouldn't be if not for the excitement [in the UK]." Inclusion in the Tate show, which received widespread media attention and reached a large public, brought FAILE more fully into the international spotlight and further established them as one of the most recognizable names in an increasingly globalized and multi-platform art world.

=== Lost in Glimmering Shadows (2008) ===
On the heels of work in England for the Baltic Gallery and the Tate Modern, FAILE displayed a series of new work in November 2008 titled Lost in Glimmering Shadows, and thematically unified exploration of tension between consumer culture and spiritual fulfillment and the contradiction between America's sometimes bloody history and its democratic ideals.

Housed in the Lilian-Baylis Old School in conjunction with Lazarides Gallery in London, Lost in Glimmering Shadows occupied an ambiently lit circular gallery space in which large-scale prints and paintings surrounded sculptural elements in the interior ring. While the temple-like lighting and installation, life-size cast of a boy with rabbit, and large-scale painted work were familiar formal carryovers from earlier exhibitions (such as 2007's commercially successful From Brooklyn With Love at Lazarides, and Nothing Lasts Forever in New York's Chinatown) Lost in Glimmering Shadows notably introduced freestanding, functional prayer wheels, circular disc paintings, and stacks of multifaceted apple boxes, all emblazoned with brightly hued text and found imagery. Moreover, the show introduced a leitmotif of heroic Native American figures in conflict with a consumption-mad America, their world "lost in glimmering shadows."

The work within the exhibition derived much of its force from ironic juxtapositions, such as a reworking of the American flag in the style of a Navajo ceramic in the acrylic on canvas Star Spangled Shadows, and the textual interplay on the prayer wheels of phrases like "In search of sacred" and roadside advertisements for "cold beer" and "snacks." This irony is redoubled by the construction here of functional religious devices (the prayer wheel) overlaid by FAILE's own international brand. At other times, the work is more explicit, depicting a suit-wearing kachina figure amidst the backdrop of a pulp serial promising "A Betrayal Story," in the painting of the same name, or implying an alternate America in It Could be Beautiful. Consistent FAILE themes such as the Challenger shuttle and urban signage were featured alongside new figures and decorative elements derived from traditional figurines and baskets, as well as appropriated 20th-century imagery and pictures from the American southwest.

=== Deluxx Fluxx (2010) ===
From 12 February to 27 March on Greek Street in London, and again from 30 April to 27 May 2010, on artist BAST to produce an installation dubbed Deluxx Fluxx, comprising custom-made, operational arcade games and a foosball table. The entire salon at 158 Allen St. and the arcade cabinets therein were wheatpasted by FAILE and BAST, and blurred the line between the traditional "white cube" method of art display and the commercial operation of a gaming parlor. While audiences were invited to play the games for free, the works themselves were part canvas, part sculptural object, and part cabinet for interactive video art. The content of the cabinets, video work modeled on classic "games," were executed in collaboration with Adapted Studio and Seth Jabour of the band Les Savy Fav.

This New York installation updated an earlier version of the show with the Lazarides Gallery in London from earlier that spring, and featured recurring FAILE and BAST images, such as kissing women, Popeye, old time boxers, a barking dog, and commercial logos and signage for, among others, Chapstick and former airline TWA. Most of the images, such as they were derived from threads within FAILE's visual archive no longer for sale as prints in their own right, while others, such as the "Fashion Chimp," may appear in future projects. While the London show provided the blueprint for the New York iteration, the latter featured new games and images, and employed neon and blacklighting to generate a fully immersive experience. The aim of Deluxx Fluxx was to bridge the DIY-sensibility and popular accessibility of street practice with the more permanent, gallery-style emphasis of FAILE's more recent work. According to the artists, "After doing the show in London, we learned a lot and had so much of the groundwork built to do the show again. There was a real sense of joy in seeing people interact with the work in this way and that was the whole point of the show from the beginning. We wanted to bring it to NYC and it was something we wanted to do on our own. Just to make it happen, much like our street art. We knew we wanted to create new machines here, to make it a new experience but the same style show."

In so doing, Deluxx Fluxx obscured the lines between artist and consumer, and viewer and participant in an attempt to recapture the recent history of the Lower East Side as a haven for anti-elitist art practices such as graffiti and punk rock. While not reviewed heavily in art publications, Deluxx Fluxx received favorable reviews, with Stephen Heyman of the New York Times arguing that "art can be diverting, but people sometimes need winners and losers to get in the game."

In 2014 Deluxx Fluxx was also exhibited at Edinburgh, Scotland's Summerhall as part of the Edinburgh Festival - alongside the Vestige Board paintings; large canvases created initially in the studio from the artists and assistants cleaning their screens and brushes on the surfaces and then later completed by Faile with the addition of recognisable "Faile" iconography on the surface. The exhibitions were a critical and popular success.

=== Temple (2010) ===
From 16 July to 5 August 2010, FAILE displayed Temple a full-scale church in ruins in Praça dos Restauradores Square in Lisbon, Portugal. The installation was made in conjunction with the Portugal Arte 10 Festival and is slated for touring abroad. Temple brought together a variety of earlier motifs—street art vernacular, prayer wheels, and a dualistic interest in the globalization of commerce and new forms of spiritual immanence—with the site specific concerns of working in an historically Catholic country. The piece itself is a building in ruins fabricated with components, such as iron gating, ceramic relief work, and painted ceramic tiles from local and foreign manufacturers. Familiar FAILE images appear in relief (an update on 15th-century Florentine sculptor Luca Della Robia), the previously 2-D "Scuba Horse" was realized as a sculptural fountain, and the white, blue, and gold color palette was a nod towards the Portuguese landscape. Temple marked FAILE's first contribution to the international festival circuit, and brought their practice full circle, taking high concept studio art back to an accessible, urban setting.

Temple received strong critical and viewer attention, and was successful at blending seamlessly into its temporary environment even as it expanded and augmented FAILE's idiosyncratic leitmotifs. According to Interview, "Faile's site-specific work seems to be the hit of the biennial. It's a shining ruin, an open-air dialogue between the sacred past and the secular present. And it's an easy match for the historical architecture encircling the busy Praça dos Restauradores, which is probably why your average cab driver likes it–and why foreign tourists passing by have been trying to look it up in their guidebooks." In its ability to blur the boundaries between art and architecture, object and display environment, Temple further amplified underlying currents in FAILE's work, such as an emphasis on openness and participation, the porousness of cultural and institutional boundaries, and the fluid integration of visual culture and the built environment.

=== Bedtime Stories (2010) ===
This exhibition of works on wood was something of a return to fundamentals, clearly emphasizing form and process, and ran From 4 November to 23 December 2010 at the Perry Rubenstein gallery in New York. Each of the twelve works' compositions were created from individually painted wooden blocks that came together in "puzzle-box" format as unified paintings. According to the text accompanying the show, the paintings on wood "reveal FAILE's relentless assimilation and refinement of the vast visual vocabularies of both the urban environment and their own decade-long practice. The grids of these paintings are at once modular and fixed, tactile and graphic. On their surfaces, iconoclastic characters fluidly intermingle with adroit deconstructions of commodity culture. The re-combinations of carefully constructed texts and images provide a glimpse into FAILE's rigorous and organic process, and draw attention to painting's inherent materiality."

=== Fragments of FAILE (2011) ===
For the late fall of 2011, FAILE made a series of new paintings for a solo show at the Lazarides Gallery in London. The new work marked a period of experimentation and a pronounced return to painting and folk tradition. While all of the pieces for Fragments of FAILE were built from existing FAILE motifs, images, and text, their formats referenced a wide array of new formal approaches, including monochromatic abstraction, figuration and portraiture, American quilting, Native American textiles, and Tibetan Mandalas. Fragments of FAILE showcased work made during an intensive phase of studio work between larger outdoor commissions. Some elements, such as the use of wood and a modular or "quilted" structure would factor prominently into subsequent installations.

=== The Wolf Within (2012) ===
In the fall of 2012, FAILE worked with the Tiger Translate program to construct a massive (15 ft. high) public sculpture at the National Garden Park complex on the outskirts of Ulaanbaatar, the capitol of Mongolia. For the commission, FAILE selected a figure drawn from their Lost in Glimmering Shadows show, a corporate-styled man seemingly in transition to a wolf-like form. Constructed at twice human scale, the original image (Eat With the Wolf)—conceived on the brink of the 2008 financial crisis—was given a new context and new associations. Wolf Within can, for example, be read as a cautionary tale for a nation in the midst of a massive mineral resource boom and in the process of rapid urbanization. It is also a reminder of the delicate balance between progress and tradition, and the persistence and resilience of the natural world. Wolf Within is a permanent installation, rather than a gallery or museum show, and marked FAILE's increasing engagement with commissioned, large-scale outdoor projects.

=== Les Ballets de FAILE (2013) ===
FAILE was commissioned by the New York City Ballet to build a new installation in the five-story atrium space of the David H. Koch Theater at the Lincoln Center for the Performing Arts on New York's Upper West Side, to be displayed during the winter and spring of 2013. In addition to a series of new paintings, FAILE also produced hundreds of individually painted wooden blocks to be given to audience members at two of the NYCB's performances. The centerpiece of the project, however, was a forty foot high tower dubbed Tower of FAILE, constructed using wooden boxes atop a wooden plinth to form an obelisk screen printed and painted with familiar FAILE imagery, and new materials drawn from research in the NYCB's archives. This tower was an outgrowth of FAILE's longer-term experimentation with wood and hybrid-sculptural forms, but was FAILE's largest constructed object to date. It took advantage of the Theater's multiple vantages and high ceilings in order to create encounters with the work that go beyond the single-perspective of a wall-mounted or wheatpasted work. In this way, the tower arguably built on earlier theories of minimalism in artmaking, and contemporary installation formats, such as Maurizio Cattelan's 2012 retrospective at the Guggenheim in New York. Of the installation, the Village Voice argued that the project signaled the emergence of the internet generation into a bastion of elite culture, and that it effectively connected "relatable populist imagery with the most rigid of bourgeois arts." In May 2013, FAILE reprised their collaboration with the NYCB, installing twenty one of their signature prayer wheels in the Koch atrium space. This installation also featured a performance by the ballet that was developed in dialogue with the art.

=== Where Wild Won't Break (2013) ===
In 2013, FAILE's first solo American museum show was held from 21 September to 22 December at Dallas Contemporary. The show featured a suite of paintings on wood with metal armatures, and a range of mixed-media works drawing on classic Americana, such as T-shirts and racing coveralls. For Where Wild Won't Break FAILE incorporated a range of imagery associated with the American west, including cowboys, bandana clad outlaws. horses, eagles, and desert landscapes. Another motif within the show was muscle car racing and associated iconography, such as patches and decals, all reworked with FAILE's by-then signature approaches of digital decollage and multimedia assemblage. The publication Artnews argued that "the adventurous, impulsive nature of the West lent itself well to FAILE's artwork because, as their name suggests, the duo embraces fallibility and spontaneity. [Citing Miller] "No matter how well you try to tame something wild, chaos will always be a part of it." While installing the Dallas Contemporary show, FAILE completed a large mural on the city's Singleton Boulevard, which reflected imagery from FAILE's archive, including the wolf man and bunny boy, juxtaposed with newer material made for the exhibition, including a bandit driving a hot rod.

=== Savage/Sacred Young Minds (2015) ===
FAILE's work returned to New York for a major retrospective at the Brooklyn Museum, running from 10 July to 4 October. The exhibition, organized by curator Sharon Matt Atkins, featured a return of the Temple, which first appeared outdoors in Lisbon, Portugal. Here, it was reconstituted in an interior gallery of the museum amid two large-scale, hand-carved sculptures, and more recent paintings and works on wood. FAILE also prepared a new arcade for the occasion, drawing on the black-lit, all-over aesthetic of its earlier pop-up Deluxx Fluxx installations with Bäst. At the Brooklyn Museum, signature arcade cabinets were complemented by new FAILE-designed pinball machines that were (like their digital counterparts) fully interactive and cultivated a sense of play and leisure within the otherwise "white cube" space of the gallery. Reviews for the show were mixed, with the Huffington Post's Jaime Rojo and Steven Harrington noting the punk rock and Dada motifs within the arcade, and praising the democratic sensibility of the installation. They argued that Savage/Sacred Young Minds offered "a full immersion and opportunity for titillating interaction, this show provides an unambiguous sense of the industry that is backing the FAILE fantasy. Throughout their work and your imagination and assumed role, you may be villain, distressed damsel, wolfman, fairey, vandal, wrestler, hot-rodder, madonna, whore, supplicant, avenger, surfing horse or simply an arcade hero who is whiling away windowless hours punching buttons, popping flippers and pumping FAILE tokens into tantalizing art machines." Others, such as Ken Johnson of the New York Times, did not see the broader implications of the show, finding it instead unfocused. He noted that, "while some other parts of the temple are amusing, intense vibes of savagery, sacredness or insanity are absent. How those psychic states might be related is obscured by Faile's bewilderingly overwrought and unfocused magpie appropriation of graphic signifiers from many times and places, from ancient Egypt to 20th-century comic books." Time Out New York, in turn, marked FAILE's movement into the museum context, and their connection to an earlier legacy in the New York avant-garde. They suggested that, "as the careers of Keith Haring and Jean-Michel Basquiat show, the street can often be an avenue into the art world, something certainly true for Patrick McNeil and Patrick Miller. Two Brooklyn artists collaborating under the all-caps name of FAILE, they've jumped from plastering walls around Williamsburg to exhibiting in galleries and museums."

=== Wishing on You (2015) ===
Throughout the summer of 2015, visitors to New York's Times Square encountered a large-scale FAILE installation titled Wishing on You. This seven-foot-high kinetic sculpture expanded on the prayer wheels that FAILE placed both inside and outside the gallery in earlier years. Wishing on You blended old and new FAILE motifs, and was built into a flat-roofed, pagoda-like shelter. Audiences climbed two steps and passed through green and red columns bearing seemingly south Asian decorative motifs. The vividly chromatic and textured wheel not only turned, but also powered neon lights in the ceiling of the structure. In this way Wishing on You paid homage not only to the traditional larger prayer wheels of Bhutan, but also the public square's history of arcades, nickelodeons, and garish advertising. Of the installation, FAILE noted that "while Wishing on You really builds on Times Square's storied past...we are also aware of how it has served for so long as a truly American place of celebration and commemoration." For his part, Times Square Alliance president Tim Tompkins remarked of Wishing on You that, "rituals that wish for hope are central to the character of our city, but especially to the character of Times Square."

=== Strong Currents (2016) and Meet Me Halfway (2017) ===
2016 marked the first FAILE show with Gordon Gallery, a contemporary art space in Tel Aviv. Hung salon style, Strong Currents brought together a range of studio-based works, and featured familiar motifs such as the reclining "wolf man" and the geometric American flag from the Lost in Glimmering Shadows era. On the whole, the show was notable for its spare compositions and looser handling. In contrast to the intricacy of the wood-block assemblages that preceded them, the works in Strong Currents had a notably graphic feel. In them, FAILE emphasized vibrant color, broad expanses, and more evident brushwork, as in a multihued bouquet of flowers on a white background, or the show's centerpiece, a woman and her horse at rest in an open field.

This line of inquiry continued into 2017 with the Paris exhibition of Meet Me Halfway. As in previous FAILE work, the process of layering and bricolage was fundamental to the multimedia works on display. But here, FAILE pressed the color-blocked sensibility of Strong Currents further, building up figural shapes using cut paper, then overpainting a neutral tone to create negative space or a ground for the composition. This process lent the figures an abstract quality reminiscent of early-20th century posters, and modernist painters like Henri Matisse. The cut paper works were displayed with a survey of recent studio-based works, including assemblages of wood blocks, copper plates, and mosaic or tile-styled arrays of smaller modules. In conjunction with this show, FAILE translated one of the smaller works into a ten-story mural on the side of a building in the city's 13th arrondissement, with a text in French that translates to "and I held my breath."

=== Stages (2018) ===
From its inception, FAILE has worked on a range of surfaces, from canvases and wood blocks to city walls. Since at least the Lost in Glimmering Shadows show, they have also attempted to turn galleries into immersive environments, building platforms, painting on display spaces, and encouraging audience participation. In 2010, they turned their attention more fully to questions of sound and lighting as well. The Stages show in Berlin brought many of these elements together, showcasing a broad spectrum of approaches to painting from the previous decade (e.g. gestural abstraction, interlocking "blocks", and fragmented collage). For this exhibition, FAILE also applied black-and-white pieces directly to the walls of the Springmann Gallery, and created a literal stage marked off by a diamond-shaped portal that framed a woman in a bandanna strumming a guitar. During the show's run, the space was carefully lighted in purples and blue and used by a variety of performers. This "environment" seemed to build on earlier experiments, and set the tone for later versions of the Deluxx Fluxx project.

=== From the Air We Share (2018–19) ===
In 2018, FAILE took on several large-scale commissions in the city of Strasbourg in northeastern France. Each of these was public facing, and focussed on a more sequential or narrative quality. In 2017, FAILE visited Strasbourg and studied its local lore, ultimately writing a poem to be illustrated by a series of massive black-and-white panels on the exterior of the Musée d'Art moderne et contemporain. The museum's site notes that text and images are epic in tone and rich in metaphor but connect to local luminaries from Marie-Antoinette to Hans Arp, as well as important geographical features like the Rhine River. Relatedly, FAILE also created a massive color mural, "Little by Little", spanning several thousand feet of the central train station overlooking the Place de la Gare. Decorative and representational fragments of FAILE paintings (e.g. the race-car driving cowboy, the surf horse, and women as both damsel and cat burglar) appear in the commission in a monumental format. As part of this project, FAILE also painted a streetcar in bright pastel tones (again, both abstract and figurative). Although the station commission ends in 2019, the "FAILE Train" will be in service for several years.

=== Public Tile Installations (Ongoing) ===
2010's Temple project in Portugal found FAILE working in ceramic on a large scale, developing cast sculptural forms and drawing inspiration from accretions of urban tiling. This process complemented FAILE's interest in vernacular architecture and American textile traditions and opened on to a new way of working in the city using ceramics. The first example of this type of work was the 104 North 7th Street project in Williamsburg, Brooklyn. For this "Casa de los Azulejos", FAILE designed an array of signature tiles in striking patterns that were then handmade and fired in a wood-burning kiln. The building, formerly a nondescript light industrial space, was clad by hand over the course of several days. According to FAILE, North 7th was a natural extension of their earlier street-based projects. Miller noted that, in creating the mosaic, "we see almost the process of how graffiti gets built up, the way it gets buffed, these sort of geometric colorfield, abstract paintings."

FAILE's work with tile murals is ongoing, and they have executed a range of custom projects in Southern California, including a home in Venice (2017) and a low-slung building in the downtown Arts District, Los Angeles (2018). This and other work in the city responds in a site-specific fashion to the local context. For example, for a public installation in Orange County's Playa District (2018), FAILE created a slate of bespoke patterns suited to the area, tessellated layouts derived from film reels, the coastal landscape, deco design, and indigenous craft. Similarly, a 2019 commission in Culver City plays on the Lantana flower and local institutions such as the Gemological Institute of America and the famed Rollerdrome.

=== Deluxx Fluxx Detroit (Ongoing) ===
The Deluxx Fluxx collaboration with Bäst is a pop-up arcade space that has appeared in multiple locations since 2010. In the summer of 2018 FAILE opened a more permanent version of the project in downtown Detroit near the "Belt", an alley between Library and Broadway Streets. The corridor features an exhibition space and is centered on a series of public arts interventions by contemporaries like Nina Chanel Abney, Carlos Rolón, and Shepard Fairey. FAILE had already shown work the year before in this area with Library Street Collective. That show, The Size of the Fight, assembled many instances of FAILE's practice, including pinball machines, works on wood, and mandala-like paintings. Many of these featured Detroit-specific motifs, as in a "Detroit Tiger" and racing logos that call out to the city. The title of the exhibition references the Mark Twain adage about the "size of the fight in the dog", and Detroit's simultaneous status as an underdog, and place of resilience and rebirth. Overall, FAILE was inspired by the energy of Detroit, and made plans for a more permanent project there.

Like earlier versions, the Detroit Deluxx Fluxx blends elements from the golden age of arcades, 80s-era basements, and the visual culture of nightclubs. It features the arcade's signature day-glo palette and ten custom video game installations. Made in collaboration with Matthew Cooley, the latter are based on Detroit-specific themes, including Robocop and the city's Eastern Market. Built out from a raw space, FAILE lined the walls with their own poster-inspired work and developed a lighting system with Andi Watson, a designer best known as creative director for the band Radiohead. According to the Detroit Free Press, "the result is a venue that's intimate (240-person capacity) and loaded with details. Its elements will be adjusted over time to create a sense of constant evolution." In this sense, Deluxx Fluxx is simultaneously an interactive art project and an active performance venue, the space hosts DJ nights focused on Detroit genres (soul, techno) and national acts (e.g. Avey Tare, Chromeo).

== Process ==
Although FAILE's completed works are iconographically and stylistically distinctive, their process of creation owes much to chance, improvisation, and openness to outside source material. This is true of both FAILE's relationship to form and content—the visual elements of their work is continuously adapted to heterogeneous materials, from grocery store sign paper to wooden boxes and painted ceramics. During the early years of their career, FAILE's primary laboratories were urban streets. On the one hand, their practice, at its most basic, consisted of painting with stencils on the built environment. On the other, from the outset FAILE developed work in the studio that drew from a wide array of international cultural influences, both sacred and profane, that were then wheatpasted in the outside world. These latter works demanded reproducibility and rapid availability for circulation, and were thus well suited to the printmaking process. After experimenting with more graphically centered black and white images, and the intensive process of layer-by-layer color transfer, FAILE introduced an element of immediacy to these prints by painting the paper prior to printing, yielding prints that were loose and chromatically expressive.

Each of these tendencies were amplified by FAILE's consistent travel and limited permanent studio space. By necessity, work was adapted to its location of display, by virtue of its inherent "site specificity," as well as the group's absorption of forms, imagery, and usable materials wherever they happened to be. Once those materials were exhausted, stencils could be used to provide a constant template in lieu of prints. This early phase was one of dynamism and experimentation, and much of FAILE's early work was left to deteriorate and interact with its environment. By 2005, when FAILE established a larger studio space, this ad hoc approach was supplemented with a more traditional approach to painting and print editions that drew on these earlier priorities (inter-cultural permutation, use of found images and signifiers, and an expressive, playful approach to execution), while taking the entropy and dynamism of the street as an object of investigation.

Although street art is a consistent aspect of FAILE's practice (in concrete terms and as a source of inspiration), the post-2005 period has permitted them to work more slowly, generating thematically driven suites (War Profitees; Lost in Glimmering Shadows), small print runs, and increasingly three-dimensional media, from arcade cabinets, salvaged wood, and large-scale casting. Each of FAILE's projects is unified, however, by a consistent openness to chance, external cultural influences, audience interactivity, and the organic rhythms of the street.

More recently, found wood and apple boxes figured into FAILE's development in their studio practice of hybrid forms of painting that blur the boundaries between religious, folk, artisanal, and sculptural forms. The histories of abstraction and quilting, as well as the modular form of the puzzle box, for example, were foundational for the suites of paintings in 2010's Bedtime Stories and 2011's Fragments of FAILE. At the same time, architectural forms and Iberian ornamental tradition were essential in constructing 2010's Temple project, a ruin featuring prayer wheels and cast relief work in Lisbon. Both elements—projects in wood, and building environments—were fused in producing an "obelisk" of printed/painted boxes in the atrium of the Koch Auditorium in New York's Lincoln Center in 2013. For much of the past decade, FAILE's work has been iterative, with outdoor and public installations informing studio-based work in an apparently dialogic way. Many of their gallery shows, for example, draw on the technical procedures developed for site-specific commissions and vice versa. While FAILE's projects are known for their high degree of finish, many seem to suggest the artistic process itself as a kind of content. As of 2019, FAILE consistently worked in a wide variety of formats, from European streetcars to tile-clad buildings in California.

FAILE has also consistently produced artist's books (typically in partnership with German publisher Gestalten Verlag) including FAILE: Prints + Originals, 1999–2009 (2010), FAILE Temple (2012), and FAILE: Works on Wood: Process, Paintings, and Sculpture (2014).

== Cultural impact ==
FAILE, like many of their contemporaries in the street art community, emphasize art making over indirect political statements or sloganeering, but their work often contains both passive and overt messages, usually cloaked in ambivalence. On the one hand, FAILE emerged from a graphic design sensibility and historically functions as a recognizable graphic presence as well as an artistic identity. Similarly, graffiti and street art have typically operated as a counterpublic artistic practice and means of garnering fame or status for "writers" and artmakers. While there is not an explicitly partisan or anti-capitalist edge to this type of work, it is structurally a political act in its flouting of laws, embrace of punk-rock and hip-hop aesthetics, and function as a means of populist or direct to the masses expression. There also exists in graffiti and street art a deeper anti-establishment trend in its attempt to beautify and reclaim the urban environment, and blur the line between the elite art gallery systems and the "outside" world of the streets.

FAILE certainly works in this tradition. Although they are not graffiti writers as such, their work originated in the streets, and their studio work bears the stylistic hallmarks of both wheatpasting/stenciling and the vernacular of the global urban environment. FAILE argues that, "our process has always resembled this loose and fast critique on society, whether it be literal or figurative. Our image-making has at times been very methodical and researched, other times it's been experimental and dirty. Street art at its roots is 'punk.' It set out to critique and comment on a world it felt outside of." Such a critique is sometimes ambivalent, as FAILE's work is marked by the consistent juxtaposition of dualities. Other times, it is more direct, as in the seemingly explicit pictures in the Lost in Glimmering Shadows exhibition, or in the public wheatpasting in 2010 of images of kissing women amid the text "No Change Will My Heart Fear." The latter echoes the ambivalent prompting of Banksy's noted "Kissing Coppers" wall painting, and is indicative of FAILE's consistent prioritization of ambivalence and open-endedness over more explicitly prescriptiveness.

There are both socially and institution-critical strands in FAILE's work and its public or alternative-space staging and execution. FAILE's work is overarchingly characterized by an open approach that allows the interpretation and meaning of their work to ramify once it enters the public sphere. Of their outdoor work, FAILE argues that "it gives a person the sense that it is there just for them. That they've stumbled across this great little gem amidst the chaos of daily life that can really speak to them. We try to build in a certain ambiguity that leaves the door open for the viewer to find themselves within the story." The openness of meaning and emphasis on the experience of the viewer marks a shared affinity with both the anti-elitist impulses of recent street art, and the more institutional ideas of site specificity and relational aesthetics. In 2010, FAILE expanded their painting and printing into the realm of reconstructed sculptural and architectural elements, religious artifacts (such as prayer wheels) and the 2010 Temple project in Lisbon. These projects reflect FAILE's concern that "everything that requires skill is disappearing from the world," and that the Temple is "an expression of the crumbling beauty of this disappearing world." This focus on public works was further developed in 2012 with the Eat With the Wolf sculpture in Ulaanbaatar; on the streets of Brooklyn and Los Angeles with the 104 N. 7th and other tile-based projects; in Times Square, Manhattan, with the large-scale, interactive prayer wheel (Wishing on You); and in a series interactive arcades that became a music venue in Detroit.

== Solo exhibitions ==
- City Lights Millennium Iconoclast Museum of Art Belgium (2021)
- From the Air We Share, Musée d'Art moderne et contemporain, Strasbourg, FR (2019)
- Where the Ends Meet, Gordon Gallery, Tel Aviv, IL (2019)
- Stages, Galerie Henrik Springmann, Berlin, Germany (2017)
- The Size of the Fight, Library Street Collective, Detroit, MI (2017)
- Meet Me Halfway, Magda Danysz Gallery, Paris, FR (2017)
- Strong Currents, Gordon Gallery, Tel Aviv, IL (2016)
- Wishing on You, Times Square (Public Installation), New York, NY (2015)
- Savage/Sacred Young Minds, The Brooklyn Museum, New York, NY (2015)
- Where Wild Won't Break, Dallas Contemporary, Dallas, TX (2013)
- Les Ballets de Faile, New York City Ballet Art Series, David H. Koch Theater at Lincoln Center, New York, NY (2013)
- The Wolf Within, Commissioned Public Sculpture by Mongolian Arts Council, UlaanBaatar, MN (2012)
- 104 N. 7th Mural, Brooklyn, NY (2012)
- Fragments of Faile, Lazarides Gallery, London, UK (2011)
- Faile: "A Decade of Prints and Originals", Post No Bills, Venice Beach, CA (2011)
- Bedtime Stories, Perry Rubenstein Gallery, New York, NY (2010)
- Lost in Glimmering Shadows, Lilian Baylis School-Lazarides Gallery, London, UK (2008)
- From Brooklyn with Love, Lazarides Gallery, London, UK (2007)
- Nothing Lasts Forever, 201 Chrystie Street, New York, NY (2007)
- Faile Prints, Fifty24, Portland, OR (2006)
- The Room NYC, New York, NY (2005)

== Selected group exhibition history ==
2018

- Beyond the Streets, Los Angeles, CA
- Art From the Streets, Art Science Museum, Singapore, SG

2017

- Eastern Skies, Condition Publique, Roubaix, FR

2016

- Love Me, Love Me Not, NYC Parks Department, Transmitter Park, Brooklyn, NY
- City Lights, MIMA Museum, Brussels, BE
- Street Art: A Global View, Central Academy of Fine Art Museum, Beijing, CN
- Commission Art Fair, Bronx, NY
- Et J'ai Retenu Mon Souffle, Street Art 13, Paris, FR

2014

- Inaugural Exhibition, Allouche Gallery, New York, NY
- FAILE & BÄST, Deluxx Fluxx Arcade Edinburgh, Summerhall Museum, Scotland, UK
- The Provocateurs, Art Alliance, Chicago, IL
- RE:DEFINE: MTV's Staying Alive Foundation Art Benefit, Dallas, TX
- Juxtapoz 20th Anniversary Show, Jonathan Levine Gallery, New York, NY
- Darren Aronofsky's Foundations of the Deep: Visions of Noah and the Flood, New York, NY
- Cat Art Show, 101/Exhibit, Los Angeles, CA

2013

  - FAILE & BÄST, Deluxx Fluxx Arcade Miami Beach, Miami, FL
- Ten Years of Wooster Collective, Jonathan LeVine Gallery, New York, NY
- Cash, Cans & Candy, Galerie Ernst Hilger, Vienna, AU

2012

- Damien Hirst's Murderme Private Collection, Pinacoteca Giovanni e Marella Agnelli, Turin, IT
- The Boneyard Project, Pima Air and Space Museum, Tucson, AZ
- Sotheby's Sick Children's Trust Benefit Sale, London, UK
- Tonight We Won't Be Bored, V1 Gallery, Copenhagen, DE

2011

- Underbelly Show, Art Basel Miami, Miami, FL
- On Every Street, Samuel Owen Gallery, Greenwich, CT
- T&J Artwalk for Human Rights Watch, Oslo, NO
- RE:DEFINE MTV's Staying Alive Foundation Art Benefit, Dallas, TX
- Art Mère / Art Père Auction LIVESTRONG Benefit, Los Angeles, CA

2010

- FAILE & BÄST, Deluxx Fluxx Arcade, Allen Street, New York, NY; Greek Street, London, UK
- Temple, Portugal Arte 10, Lisbon, PT
- Meet Me Inside, Gagosian Gallery, Los Angeles, CA
- Viva La Revolucion: A Dialogue with the Urban Landscape, Museum of Contemporary Art, San Diego, CA
- Underbelly Project, Brooklyn, NY

2008

- Poster Resistance 2, New Image Art Gallery, Los Angeles, CA
- Street Art, Tate Modern, London, UK
- Outsiders, The New Art Gallery Walsall, Walsall, UK; Houston and Bowery, Lazarides, New York, NY

2007

- The Burning House (Faile, Dave Ellis, and Swoon), Museum Hetdomein, Sittard, ND; New Image Art Gallery, Los Angeles, CA

2006

- Spank the Monkey, Baltic Centre for Contemporary Arts, Newcastle-Gateshead, UK
- Tiger Translate, Shanghai Sculpture Space, Shanghai, CN
- Animalia, Irvine Contemporary, Washington, DC
- Mural Commission, Weiden+Kennedy, Portland, OR
- Wall Snatchers, Washington Project for the Arts, Washington, DC
- Swish, Lazarides Gallery, London, UK

2005

- Untitled, Fifty24SF, San Francisco, CA
- Ridiculousnessofitallshow, New Image Art Gallery, Los Angeles, CA
- Design Edge, IdN, Singapore, SG
- Denver Show, Andenken Gallery, Denver, CO
- The Pony Show, New York, NY
- ROJO Golden, Stay Gold Gallery, Brooklyn, NY; Urbis Artium Gallery, San Francisco, CA
- The First LA Weekly Biennial, Track 16 Gallery, Los Angeles, CA
- Supreme Trading N8 Gallery, Brooklyn, NY

2004

- Weiden + Kennedy, Amsterdam, ND
- Espai Pupu, Barcelona, SP
- Lab 101, Los Angeles, CA
- Break Beat Science Showroom, Tokyo, JP
- X-Girl, New York, NY
- Les Complices, Zurich, CH
- One Eye Space, Los Angeles, CA
- Lavender, Transplant Gallery, New York, NY
- Mural, Diesel Store, Austin, TX
- Pictures on Walls, Diesel Denim Gallery, New York, NY

2003

- Battle Graphics, McCaig-Welles, New York, NY
- Secret Party, Bob's, New York, NY
- Hasta Pronto, Centre Cultural Es Jonquet, Majorca, SP
- Back Jumps Live Issue, Bethanien Kreuzberg, Berlin, DE
- Jungle LP Show, Rocket Gallery, Tokyo, JP
- Broken Sunshine (curated by FAILE), Firehouse 87 Lafayette Street, New York, NY
- Fancy Faile and Bast, Neurotitam Haus Schwarzenberg, Berlin, DE
- Transplant Gallery, New York, NY
- M3projects, New York, NY

2002

- The Big Group Show, M3Projects, New York, NY
- Faile Presents Boredom Project, V1 Gallery, Copenhagen, DE
- Surface 2 Air, Paris, FR
- Dragon Bar, London, UK
- Max Fish Gallery, New York, NY
- Gas Experiment, Tokyo, JP
- Supersonic & Alien, Galleria S.A.L.E.S., Rome, IT
