= Sixeart =

Spanish artist

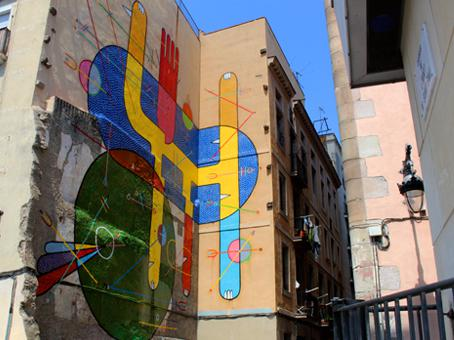
- Sixe Paredes, tribute to Joan Miró, Raval, Barcelona, 2014
- Born: 1975 (age 50–51); Badalona, Spain
- Style: Graffiti
- Website: www.sixeparedes.com

Sergio Hidalgo Paredes is a Spanish contemporary artist from Barcelona known as Sixe art or Sixeart. He was a graffiti artist in Barcelona; in the late 1980s he started painting. In 2008, he was one of the six artists invited to paint the river façade of the Tate Modern in London.

== Exhibitions ==
- Truck Art Project. - Madrid, España, 2016.
