= List of street artists =

This is a list of notable street artists.

== Africa ==
=== Egypt ===
- Alaa Awad - street art, painter
- Aya Tarek – graffiti
- Ganzeer – stencil graffiti
- Keizer – stencil graffiti, street poster art

=== Nigeria ===
- Osa Seven – graffiti, street art, graphic design

=== South Africa ===
- Faith47 – graffiti, street art, fine art
- Ben Jay Crossman - graffiti-style street artist, concept artist, illustrator, photographer, film producer, director

== America ==
=== Argentina ===
- Milagros Correch - muralist
- Ever (Buenos Aires) – street art

=== Brazil ===
- Alexandre Ōrion – graffiti, stencil graffiti, photography
- Os Gemeos – graffiti
- Ananda Nahu – graffiti
- Eduardo Kobra – graffiti, muralist

=== Canada ===
- Lionel (artist) - street installation, ad-hacks, wheatpasting, stencil graffiti
- Posterchild – stencil graffiti, street poster art

=== Mexico ===
- Pablo Delgado – paste-ups
- Golgo

=== Peru ===
- Monky – chicha posters, screen printing
- Elliot Túpac – murals, lettering, chicha posters

=== Venezuela ===
- Enrique Enn – stencil graffiti, street poster art

=== United States ===
A–L

- ABOVE (San Francisco) - now known as Tavar Zawacki- stencils, installation art, contemporary painter.
- Federico Archuleta (Austin, Texas) – stencil murals
- Atlas, Alhambra, California
- AVANT (New York City) – guerrilla art, street art
- B.N.E. (New York City)
- Beautiful Angle (Tacoma, Washington) – wheatpasting letterpress
- Jean-Michel Basquiat (New York City)
- Borf (Washington, D.C.) – graffiti, stencils
- Caine 1 (New York City)
- André Pierre Charles (New York City)
- David Choe (Los Angeles)
- Clandestine Culture (Miami) wheatpaste posters
- Claw Money (New York City)
- Robbie Conal (Los Angeles) – poster art
- Tim "CON" Conlon (Alexandria, Virginia) – graffiti, street installations
- Cool "Disco" Dan (Dan Hogg, Washington, D.C.) – graffiti
- Cope2 (born Fernando Carlo in the Bronx, New York) – graffiti
- Cornbread (born Darryl McCray in Philadelphia, Pennsylvania) – graffiti
- Shai Dahan
- Dondi (graffiti artist) (New York City)
- Brad Downey (born 1980 in Louisville, Kentucky) – film, sculpture, painting and drawing.
- El Celso (New York City)
- Ron English – billboards, stencils, murals
- Faile (Brooklyn, New York) – artist collective
- Shepard Fairey (Los Angeles) – street artist and graphic designer; OBEY campaign
- Tatyana Fazlalizadeh (New York) – Stop Telling Women to Smile campaign
- Futura 2000 (New York City) – subway writer
- Galo Canote (aka LoveGalo and MakeOne - Los Angeles x Guadalajara) - Graffiti, murals, sculpture, installation art curator
- Guerrilla Girls (New York City)
- Graffiti Research Lab (New York City)
- Dave Halili (Los Angeles) – graffiti and album cover artist
- Richard Hambleton (New York City)
- Hanksy (New York City)
- Indie184 (New York City)
- Kaws (New York City)
- Keith Haring (New York City)
- Maya Hayuk (New York) – boldly colored murals
- IZ the Wiz (born November 30, 1958 – June 17, 2009 as Michael Martin) – bold colored work
- Chris Johanson (California) - Graffiti, murals, sculpture, installation art
- Lady Aiko (Brooklyn) – street art
- Lady Pink (New York)
- JonOne (New York City) – graffiti
- Mark Jenkins (Alexandria, Virginia) – street installations
- Michael Kirby (Baltimore, Maryland)
- Margaret Kilgallen (San Francisco)
- Knitta Please (Houston, Texas) – knitted graffiti
- Liz LaManche (Boston) – murals, pavement art
- Logan Hicks (New York City) - American Contemporary Artist

M–Z

- Barry McGee (born 1966 in San Francisco, California; also known as "Twist", "Twister", "Ray Fong" and others)
- Greg Mike (Atlanta) – street art, murals, Loudmouf Icon
- Eric Millikin (Detroit)
- Mr. Brainwash (Los Angeles)
- Mear One (Los Angeles)
- Mister Cartoon (Los Angeles) – tattoo, graffiti
- Alec Monopoly (Los Angeles) – street art, fine art, murals
- Morley (Los Angeles) – wheatpaste artist
- Neck Face (California) – graffiti
- Nsumi (New York City) – art collective
- Olek (New York City) – street installations
- Pat Perry – itinerant muralist
- Plastic Jesus (Los Angeles) – graffiti, street installations
- Poster Boy (New York City) – New York City Subway street artist
- Stephen Powers (ESPO)
- Annie Preece (Los Angeles)
- Priz-one (New York City) – graffiti
- Rammellzee (New York City) – gothic futurist, graffiti
- Retna (born Marquis Lewis 1979; Los Angeles) – graffiti
- Revs (New York City), graffiti and urban art
- Jorge Rodriguez-Gerada (New York City) – urban art, culture jamming
- Stephanie Rond (Columbus, Ohio)
- Rubin415 (New York City) - graffiti
- Saber (Los Angeles) – graffiti
- Sabo (Los Angeles)
- SAMO (New York City)
- Sane Smith (New York City)
- Scape Martinez (California) – abstract expressionist, graffiti, public art installations
- Kenny Scharf (Los Angeles)
- Seen (New York City) – "The godfather of graffiti", tattoos, toys
- Sidewalk Sam (Boston) – pavement art
- SJK 171 (New York City) – graffiti writing pioneer
- Skullphone (Los Angeles)
- Smear (Cristian Gheorghiu) (Los Angeles) – graffiti, street art, contemporary painter
- The Splasher (New York City) – a serial vandal who splattered other works of street art with paint
- Stay High 149 (born Wayne Roberts; October 20, 1950 – June 11, 2012; New York) – graffiti artist
- Melanie Stimmell (Los Angeles) – Madonnari-style street painting
- Swoon (New York City) – cut out, wheatpasting
- TAKI 183 (Bronx, New York) – graffiti writing pioneer
- Jacek Tylicki (New York City) – early street art – art war
- Erni Vales (New York City)
- Dan Witz (Brooklyn, New York)
- Jason Wulf (New York City) – graffiti artist
- XVALA (primarily Los Angeles) - street installations, stencils, graffiti
- Tavar Zawacki (San Francisco) - Street art pioneer. Stencils, installation art, contemporary painter.

== Asia ==
=== Afghanistan ===
- Shamsia Hassani – street art, digital art

=== Hong Kong ===
- Tsang Tsou Choi, also known as "King of Kowloon" – graffiti

=== India ===
- Daku, pseudonymous – graffiti, social commentary
- Yantr, pseudonymous – machines, social commentary

=== Iran ===
- A1one, also known as "Tanha" – graffiti, street Art
- Black Hand – pseudonymous stencil artist
- Reza Rioter – graffiti

=== Israel ===
- Solomon Souza – spray-paint art
- Know Hope - Social Practice artist

=== Korea ===
- Royal Dog - graffiti writing, spray murals

=== Pakistan ===
- Sanki King (Karachi) – graffiti, street art, sneaker art

=== Thailand ===
- Headache Stencil

=== Yemen ===
- Murad Subay, known for his street art campaigns, that engage the community in doing art and murals to express themselves via art – street art and graffiti

== Europe ==
=== Belgium ===
- ROA – graffiti (animals and birds)

=== Denmark ===
- TEJN – Lock On street sculptures, paste up, stencil, installation, conceptual art

=== Finland ===
- Sampsa – graffiti, stencil art and painting

=== France ===
- André (born 1971 as André Saraiva; also known as "Mr. A", "Monsieur A" or "Monsieur André") – Swedish-Portuguese graffiti artist; lives in Paris
- Ash – graffiti
- Blek le Rat – stencil graffiti, poster art
- C215 – stencil graffiti
- Darco (born 1968 as Darco Gellert in Bielefeld, Germany) – graffiti artist; lives and works in Paris
- EL Seed – calligraphy graffiti
- Ememem – anonymous street mosaic artist
- Invader – mosaic
- Jef Aérosol – stencil graffiti
- JR – graffiti, poster art, photography
- Kim Prisu - stencil graffiti
- Thierry Noir – Berlin Wall artist
- M. Chat (Thoma Vuille, born July 16, 1977) – graffiti
- Miss.Tic – stencil
- Miss Van – graffiti
- Seb Toussaint – street art, murals
- Zevs (born 1977) – anonymous street artist

=== Georgia ===
- Gagosh – street artist; stencil, graffiti, mosaics, installation
- Dr. Love – street artist, graffiti

=== Germany ===
- 3Steps (founded 1998) – a contemporary street artist collective between the twins Kai Harald Krieger (born March 15, 1980) and Uwe Harald Krieger (born March 15, 1980) and Joachim Pitt (born December 8, 1980)
- DAIM (born 1971 in Lüneburg as Mirko Reisser) – graffiti
- Darco see: France
- DOME (real name: Christian Krämer) – street art, murals, urban art
- El Bocho (Berlin) – street art
- Boris Hoppek (born 1970, in Kreuztal; also known as "Forty") – contemporary artist based in Barcelona; artistic roots lie in graffiti, but today his work spans painting, photography, video, sculpture and installation art
- Irmela Mensah-Schramm – hate speech alteration / effacement, archiving
- MadC (real name: Claudia Walde) – graffiti, graphic design
- Klark Kent (born 1973 in Frankfurt am Main, Germany) – graffiti artist and music producer
- van Ray (born 1984 in Düsseldorf) – street art and urban art artist
- Various & Gould – Berlin based street art and urban art duo
- Undenk (Germany and Australia)

=== Greece ===
- Argiris Ser – street art, graffiti, lowbrow
- Bleeps.gr – street painting, wheatpasting, stencil graffiti
- INO – painting, murals, graffiti, street art
- Woozy (born 1979 as Vaggelis Hoursoglou) – street art, graffiti

=== Ireland ===
- Fin DAC – murals, painting
- Will St Leger – stencil, painting

=== Italy ===
- 108 – graffiti
- Blu – graffiti, stop motion
- Cibo – murals over neo-fascist graffiti
- Geco – graffiti
- Neve – graffiti, murals
- Sten Lex – stencil

=== The Netherlands ===
- Ces53
- Harmen de Hoop – art interventions
- JDL street art - Large scale realistic murals
- Leon Keer – 3D street artist, anamorphic, street art
- Max Zorn

=== Norway ===
- Dolk – graffiti, stencil graffiti
- DOT DOT DOT – graffiti, stencil graffiti
- Pøbel – graffiti, stencil graffiti
- Martin Whatson – graffiti, stencil graffiti

=== Poland ===
- Crocheted Olek – yarn bombing

=== Portugal ===
- Add Fuel (born Diogo Machado) – graffiti
- Bordalo II – large installations made from recycled trash
- Vhils – bas relief

=== Russia ===
- Pavel 183 – graffiti

=== Spain ===
- Chanoir (Barcelona) – graffiti
- El Xupet Negre (Barcelona) – graffiti
- La Mano/Nami (Spanish for The Hand) – graffiti artist based in Barcelona
- Muelle (Madrid)

=== Sweden ===
- Akay – graffiti
- Czon – sculptures, statues, installations, pasties, graffiti
- Max Magnus Norman – sculptures, installations
- NUG – graffiti, video art

=== Switzerland ===
- Dare (graffiti artist) (1968-2010) real name Sigi (Siegfried) von Koeding, was a Swiss graffiti artist and curator
- Harald Naegeli (born December 4, 1939) – known as the "Sprayer of Zurich" after the graffiti he sprayed in the late 1970s
- NEVERCREW (Christian Rebecchi, born December 20, 1980; Pablo Togni, born September 29, 1979) – mural paintings, installations

=== United Kingdom ===
- Banksy (Bristol) – graffiti, stencil graffiti
- Cartrain (London-Leytonstone) – stencil, collage
- James Cochran (London) – graffiti, street art, murals
- Andy Council (Bristol) – graffiti, murals
- Cutup (London) – billboards
- D.N.Z (London) - Stencil art
- Darren Cullen (London) – graffiti, stencil graffiti
- Robert Del Naja (Bristol) (also known as 3D) – graffiti, street art, album covers
- Guy Denning (born Bristol) – stencil graffiti, paste-up, painting
- Ben Eine – street art, alphabet letters
- Inkie (Bristol and London) – graffiti, street art, grap design
- Paul Insect (London) – graffiti, stencil graffiti, street art
- Alex Martinez (Notting Hill, London) – graffiti, street art
- My Dog Sighs (Portsmouth) – street art, murals
- Christiaan Nagel (London) – The Mushroom Man, street art sculpture
- Adam Neate (London) – art on cardboard
- Phlegm (Sheffield) – murals, street art
- King Robbo (London) – graffiti, trainwriting, street art
- Sickboy (Bristol and London) – graffiti, street art
- Rich Simmons (Croydon) – street art, stencil graffiti, pop art
- Stik (London) – graffiti, street art
- Temper (Birmingham/Wolverhampton) – graffiti, canvas
- Sweet Toof (London) – graffiti, murals
- Seb Toussaint – street art, murals, canvas
- Nick Walker (Bristol) – graffiti, murals

== Oceania ==
=== Australia ===
- Civilian – stencil graffiti
- Luke Cornish (also known as "E.L.K.")) – stencil graffiti
- Lushsux - graffiti
- Facter (also known as "Fletcher Andersen")) – graffiti, street art & toy designer
- Fred Fowler – stencil art, post-graffiti
- Jisoe – graffiti
- Juilee Pryor – murals
- Meek – stencil graffiti
- Mini Graff – stencil graffiti
- Pam the Bird - graffiti
- Phibs – stencil graffiti
- Prism – stencil graffiti
- Rone – stencil graffiti, street poster art
- Shida – murals
- Stormie Mills – graffiti art
- Vexta – stencil graffiti
- ZAM-1 – graffiti

== See also ==
- Lists of artists by nationality
