= Poster Boy (street artist) =

American graffiti artists

Poster Boy is a decentralized group of vandals. Since the beginning, Poster Boy has remained anonymous and refuse to sell or sign any original work. The collective's work focuses the principles of hip hop, specifically the element of graffiti, by limiting almost all work to improvisation. Using only a razor blade, Poster Boy creates satiric collage-like works created by cutting out sections of the self-adhesive advertisement posters in the platforms of New York City Subway stations, and pasting them back in different positions. Poster Boy is also referred to a 'Poster Boy movement' where other people produce similar unsigned work in the New York City subways imitating this original artist. Even after their first arrest, of Brooklyn resident Henry Matyjewicz, the collective remains active online and on the streets.

One of Poster Boy's work is featured in Banksy's 2010 documentary Exit Through the Gift Shop.

Poster Boy's work was also included in the retrospective street art show "10 Years of Wooster Collective" at Jonathan LeVine Gallery in 2013.

== Work ==
"At first, it was just something to keep me occupied while waiting on the subway." "I was playing with the posters, cutting them up" (he carried a razor used at work) and discovered that unlike the cardboard posters in the subway trains, the advertising posters on the subway platforms were printed on a self-adhesive material that could be stuck back down after being torn or cut out. He began to play with available images and text to create humorous "mash-ups" of advertisements. In 2008 alone, he has created over 200 manipulated underground posters in NYC subway. He compares the creation of poster "mash-ups" to hip hop "freestyling" on a microphone. He does not have preconceived notions of what the work will be ("I don't have anything planned…go there, see something, get inspired and do the work"), but uses the available images, often in a way that relates to current events. One commentator noted: "The pieces generally have a critical edge to them, making comments on the state of society and on the advertisements themselves." This can be explicitly political (as his pieces on Sean Bell, "IRAN = NAM", "Obama Drama," and Gaza), or a more general send up of celebrity and corporate culture.

Poster Boy has been called the "Matisse of subway-ad mash-ups," "a kind of anti-consumerist Zorro with a razor blade," and "an anti-consumerist guerilla artist." Culture reporter Ben Walters has said of his work "Poster Boy's work straddles two boisterous artistic subcultures: street art and culture jamming." Poster Boy has said of his technique, "No matter what I do to the piece, as long as I did something to those advertisements and that saturation, it's political. It's anti-media, anti–established art world."

Poster Boy calls the work "A social thing, as opposed to being an artist making things for bored rich people to hang above their couch." Besides the message of the individual piece, the aspect of producing anonymous public art that other people could do is part of the work. In a video interview, he has said of his work, "I want it to be free of copyright and free of authorship, as much as possible." "The overall goal for Poster Boy is to inspire others. I'd love to see people take up the Poster Boy model and create change within their environment." As his fame has grown, others have begun to emulate the technique. Whether these are unconnected individuals copying one original artist, or part of the "Poster Boy model" or "movement" has not been publicly confirmed.

Poster Boy's work is transitive (usually ripped down by MTA employees) but recorded in photographs. Photos of most of his work put up on the Poster Boy photostream on the Flickr photo sharing website.

Poster Boy has collaborated with Aakash Nihalani, a street artist who uses brightly colored electrical tape to create geometric patterns, and has worked on large outdoor monochrome pieces covering illegal NPA billboards with Jordan Seiler of the Public Ad Campaign.

Poster Boy's work had recently grown in scale and he has applied his technique to large billboards. He seems to have been unaware of the somewhat similar and earlier billboard work of the UK group Cutup.

In March 2009, a major installation of subway advertising by the Museum of Modern Art at the Atlantic / Pacific subway stop in Brooklyn, consisting just of reproductions of works shown in MOMA, was doctored by what was claimed to be "the mysterious Poster Boy collective" along with Doug Jaeger of thehappycorp. The cutups included part of a Goodyear tire appearing to be floating with Monet's waterlilies.

The initial Poster Boy work was all illicit, and he claimed "I don't want to make any money off of it. I don't want to bring it into the galleries.". However, after his arrest in January 2009 his work has been shown in galleries, including a one-person show in Eastern District Brooklyn, April 3–26, 2009. He was also included in the group show, Razors, Tape, Glass, at Jajo Gallery in Newark New Jersey. This move has been criticized in the street art blogs.

== Legal issues ==
Poster Boy's cutting and pasting of subway advertisements is illegal. Previously their work had been noted by the MTA police, but did not seem a high priority for them. "Vandalism of our property is illegal, and we prosecute to the fullest extent of the law," spokesperson Aaron Donovan told reporter Brian Raftery. "That being said, the problem to date has been minimal." He has had several brushes with the law, but on occasions transit police have let him go. On January 30, 2009, while attending a benefit for Friends We Love artist's video documentaries, a person thought to be Poster Boy was arrested by undercover police agents waiting for him. This "Poster Boy" was charged with two misdemeanor counts of criminal mischief and went before a Judge on February 9, 2009.

On December 16, 2009, Matyjewicz pleaded guilty to the offenses. In exchange, the judge agreed to vacate the felony provided Matyjewicz served 210 hours of community service. Once completed, he would get three years' probation.

Sometime around January 2009, Poster Boy's underground fame became such that there seemed to be several imitators, and his idea of having others "take up the Poster Boy model" seemed to be catching on. There even seems to be some confusion over whether the Poster Boy, arrested on January 30, 2009, was the same Poster Boy who initiated the subway collages, or a "legal" above ground stand in. The New York Times reports a call from Poster Boy saying the man who was arrested "is one of the many individuals who believe in the Poster Boy 'movement'" The Adbusters website notes that "Sources close to the artist maintain that there are, in fact, multiple 'Poster Boys' presently engaged in the project." In an interview after the arrest, Henry Matyjewicz has said that "Henry is an artist just inspired by what's going on with the Poster Boy movement."

== See also ==
- Posterchild, a Toronto-based street artist
- List of street artists in the United States
- Street art
