= Civilian (disambiguation) =

A civilian is generally a person who is not an active member of his or her country's armed forces, uniformed police force, or uniformed fire and rescue service

Civilian(s) or The Civilian(s) may also refer to:

== Law ==
- A specialist in Roman law
- A specialist in modern civil law
- A member of the College of Civilians
- A member of the Indian Civil Service in British India

== Music ==
- Civilian (Boy Kill Boy album), 2006
- Civilian (Gentle Giant album), 1980
- Civilian (Wye Oak album) or the title song, 2011
- Civilian, an album by Adam Pascal, 2004
- Civilian, an album by Frank Tovey, 1988
- Civilians (Joe Henry album) or the title song, 2007

== Other uses ==
- Civilian (street artist), Australian street artist
- The Civilian, a New Zealand satirical website
- The Civilians, an investigative theatre company in New York City
- Nissan Civilian, a light bus
