= NoonieNoonieNoonie =

French street artist

NoonieNoonieNoonie is an anonymous street artist active in Paris. The identity of NNNN is unknown, although they have garnered a lot of French press. In 2017, Ozy Magazine listed NoonieNoonieNoonie as "one of the nine creative stars to know".

== See also ==
- List of street artists

== Additional sources ==
- Stemmelin, Pierre (21 April 2014). "Interview exclusive avec le Street Artiste NoonieNoonieNoonie". Archived from the original on 24 April 2014.
