= Geco =

Geco may refer to:

- Geco (artist), Italian street artist
- Geco (Geophysical Company of Norway)
- Gustav Genschow & Co., German company; maker of bullets found in the investigation of the Murders of Gene and Eugene Thomas

== See also ==
- GECO, the General Engineering Company of Ontario
