= Michael Kirby =

Michael Kirby may refer to:

- Michael Kirby (judge) (born 1939), retired Australian High Court judge
- Michael J. L. Kirby (born 1941), Canadian politician and chair of the Mental Health Commission of Canada
- Michael G. Kirby (born 1952), American politician
- Michael Kirby (artist), American street artist
- Michael Kirby (figure skater) (1925–2002), Canadian figure skater and actor
- Michael Kirby (theater) (1931–1997), professor of drama at New York University
- Michael David Kirby (born 1953), U.S. diplomat and former ambassador to Moldova and Serbia
