= Wendy Murray (artist) =

New Zealand-Australian visual artist

- Born: 1974 (age 51–52); New Zealand
- Other name: Mini Graff
- Occupations: Visual artist, graphic designer, academic
- Known for: Poster design
- Website: www.wendymurray.com.au

Wendy Murray (born 1974) is a New Zealand-Australian visual artist and arts educator, formerly known as Mini Graff, under which name she worked as an urban street-poster artist between 2003 and 2010. Murray's use of letraset transfers, accompanied with vibrant colours and fluorescent inks, references the work of studios from the 1960s through to the 1980s, including the community-based Earthworks Poster Collective and Redback Graphix.

Murray was born in New Zealand. She gained a Bachelor's in Design from Massey University, New Zealand, in 1999 and, following a move to Australia, earned a Master of Fine Arts from the National Art School, Sydney, in 2014.

== Selected commissions and awards ==
- 2018 – University of Sydney Printer in Residence Award
- 2018 – Love is Hard Work – Castlemaine, VIC
- 2017 – The Newtown Hub / Newtown Art Seat (awarded by Inner West Council)
- 2014 – Behind this Smile, Hobsons Bay City Council

== Publications ==
- Banksy in the Burbs, Art Guide, 2016.
- Antonia Aitken, Artist as Conduit, Imprint Magazine, Winter 2015, volume 50, No. 2, 2015.

=== Art books ===
- Night & Day – Hill End drawings by Wendy Murray, digital, perfect bound, edition 200, 2019.
- Sydney – We Need to Talk!, digital, screen print, perfect binding / hand-bound, edition 100, 2018.
- Pull Your Punches, digital, perfect bound, edition 75, 2017.
- The Daily – Drawing Inspiration, digital, perfect bound, edition 75, 2017.

== Curatorial ==
- Wendy Murray and Stuart Bailey, Fresh Blood – Redback Graphix and its Aftermath, Casula Powerhouse Arts Centre, 13 January – 17 March 2018

== See also ==
- List of Street Artists
- Stencil Graffiti
