= Dome (artist) =

German graffiti artist (born 1975)

- Born: Christian Krämer; 1975 (age 50–51); Karlsruhe, Germany
- Known for: Graffiti, Street art, Sculpture,

Dome (born 1975) is a German graffiti artist.

== Creativity and exhibitions ==
In 1995, Christian Krämer began to study spray painting. By the 2000s he took part in exhibitions. In the beginning of his artistic career Krämer used a large color palette, but since 2012 his work has been monochrome. Krämer's style has been classified as avant-garde, as he combines realistic and surreal elements.

=== Germany ===
2001

- Die Faerberei in Munich; title of the exhibition: "Ostasinn"

2002

- Gotec House of culture in Karlsruhe; title of the exhibition: "X – flammable"

2003

- Die Faerberei in Munich; title of the exhibition: " Ostasinn"

2004

- Reithalle in Ingolstadt; title of the exhibition: "Graffiti war Gestern"
- Baden Art society in Karlsruhe; title of the exhibition: "Member exhibition"

2005

- Baden Art society in Karlsruhe; title of the exhibition: "Member exhibition"

2006

- Wildwuchs Gallery in Freiburg; title of the exhibition: "Opening"
- Färberei in Munich; title of the exhibition: "Kunst Kultur Kongress"
- Gotec House of culture in Karlsruhe; title of the exhibition: "Urban Signs"

2007

- Gotec House of culture in Karlsruhe; title of the exhibition: "Urban Signs 2"
- Carhartt Gallery in Weil am Rhein; title of the exhibition: "Carhartt Gallery"
- Baden Art society in Karlsruhe; title of the exhibition: "Member exhibition"

2008

- Carhartt Gallery in Weil am Rhein; title of the exhibition: "Carhartt Gallery"
- Gotec House of culture in Karlsruhe; title of the exhibition: "Urban Signs 3"
- Carhartt Gallery in Weil am Rhein; title of the exhibition: "Exhibition for Urban Arts"
- Intoxicated Demons Gallery in Berlin; title of the exhibition: "Addicted to details"
- Gallery im Schlachthaus in Karlsruhe; title of the exhibition: "Solo show"
- Baden Art society in Karlsruhe; title of the exhibition: "Member exhibition"

2009

- Gotec House of culture in Karlsruhe; title of the exhibition: "Urban Signs 4"
- SAP in Walldorf; title of the exhibition: "Street Art Painting"
- Intoxicated Demons Gallery in Berlin; title of the exhibition: "Kunst im Tresor"
- Nuthouse Gallery in Munich; title of the exhibition: "Stroke 01"
- Baden Art society in Karlsruhe; title of the exhibition: "Member exhibition"

2010

- Aliseo Art Projects in Gengenbach; title of the exhibition: "Zerfall und Zukunft"
- SNNC in Wanderausstellung; title of the exhibition: "Schwarz auf Weiss"
- Nuthouse Gallery in Munich; title of the exhibition: "Stroke 02"
- Gallery X Hoch 4 in Ingolstadt; title of the exhibition: "Das andere Echt"

2011

- Gallery Rheinstrasse in Karlsruhe; title of the exhibition: "Summer exhibition"
- Art society Freiburg in Freiburg; title of the exhibition: "New contemporary art"
- Gallery Rheinstrasse in Karlsruhe; title of the exhibition: "Kunst schenken"

2012

- Art society Schopfheim in Schopfheim; title of the exhibition: "Nachtgestalten"
- City Gallery in Saarbrücken; title of the exhibition: "Urban Art Show"

2014

- Urban Art Gallery in Stuttgart; title of the exhibition: "Urban playground"

=== Italy ===
2008

- Museo Civico in Bassano del Grappa; title of the exhibition: " Infart 3"
- Atrion in Milano; title of the exhibition: " Urban Painting "

2010

- Urban Painting Gallery in Milano; title of the exhibition: "Summer Show"
- Open Lab Gallery in Genova; title of the exhibition: "Great stuff"
- Urban Painting Gallery in Milano; title of the exhibition: " Milano Design Week "

2011

- Castello Visconteo in Visconteo; title of the exhibition: "Urban Painting"

2012

- Urban Painting Gallery in Carugate; title of the exhibition: " Urban Painting Night "

=== Austria ===
2009

- Museumsquartier in Wien; title of the exhibition: "Streetartpassage"

=== Denmark ===
2009

- Gallery Jenzen in Aalborg; title of the exhibition: "Urban Art"

=== Israel ===
2013

- STA Gallery in Tel Aviv; title of the exhibition: "Solo Exhibition"

=== United States ===
2013

- Wynwood in Miami; title of the exhibition: "Shoot for the moon "

== Festivals and events ==
2013

- Street Art Doping (Warsaw, Poland)
- Sketchmate (Chieri, Italy)
- Wynwood Embassy (Miami, USA)

== See also ==
- Street art
- List of street artists
