= Sickboy (artist) =

Bristol street artist

Sickboy Burning Candy
- Born: 1980 (age 45–46)
- Style: Street art
- Movement: Bristol underground scene; Graffiti
- Website: sickboykks on Instagram

Sickboy (1980) is the name of a street artist from Bristol, UK, known for his temple logo and his 'Save the Youth' slogan. Sickboy moved to London in 2007 and his street art became prevalent particularly in the Shoreditch area and London Borough of Tower Hamlets.

Sickboy originally trained in fine art and, as well as painting graffiti on the street, he also paints on canvas and exhibits conventionally in art galleries. He has been painting street art since circa 1995. In recent years Sickboy has become known for painting his 'temple' logo on wheelie bins, which can then be worth up to £50,000.

In a 2011 The Guardian article Sickboy named Spanish street artist La Mano as a major influence. He said "At the time, graffiti was mainly seen as letter-based, but [Le Mano] just used a logo and repeated it... I'd never been a big fan of stencil work, which is where a lot of people think graffiti crosses over into more acceptable street art. La Mano stuck more closely to the graffiti aspect, which I try to adhere to now. I like the freehand, grab-a-tin-of-spray-paint approach".
