= Morley (artist) =

American artist

- Born: 1982 (age 43–44); Iowa City, Iowa, United States
- Education: School of Visual Arts
- Movement: Street Art

Morley (born 1982) is a street artist based in Los Angeles, California. He specializes in wheatpaste prints that feature bold text and an image of the artist drawing the words with a Sharpie marker. Morley has indicated that he studied at The School of Visual Arts in New York. In 2011 his work caught the eye of former Banksy manager Steve Lazarides, whose Outsiders division began selling screen prints of his work shortly after. His work has been featured in the books: "It's A Stickup: Posters from the World's Greatest Street Artists", "Stay Up! Los Angeles Street Art", "Happy Graffiti: Street Art with Heart", "New Street Art", and "The Popular History of Graffiti: From the Ancient World to the Present", "New Street Art".

In 2014, his first book "If You're Reading This, There's Still Time" was published by Cameron + Company books. In it, Morley is described by The Huffington Post as “the antithesis of street artists. Where traditional taggers obscure their name in scrawled script only readable to their own, Morley prints big messages with his large, bold lettering. Where most find it cool to be cryptic, Morley shares his wit in complete sentences. Where many street artists prefer anonymity or an empowered alter-ego, Morley includes a plain drawing of his unglamorous self writing each ironic aphorism. His humor veers from self-deprecating to sly, his insight ranges from soul searching to silly.”

== Street pasting ==
Morley's posts photos of his work along with stories and anecdotes on his blog.

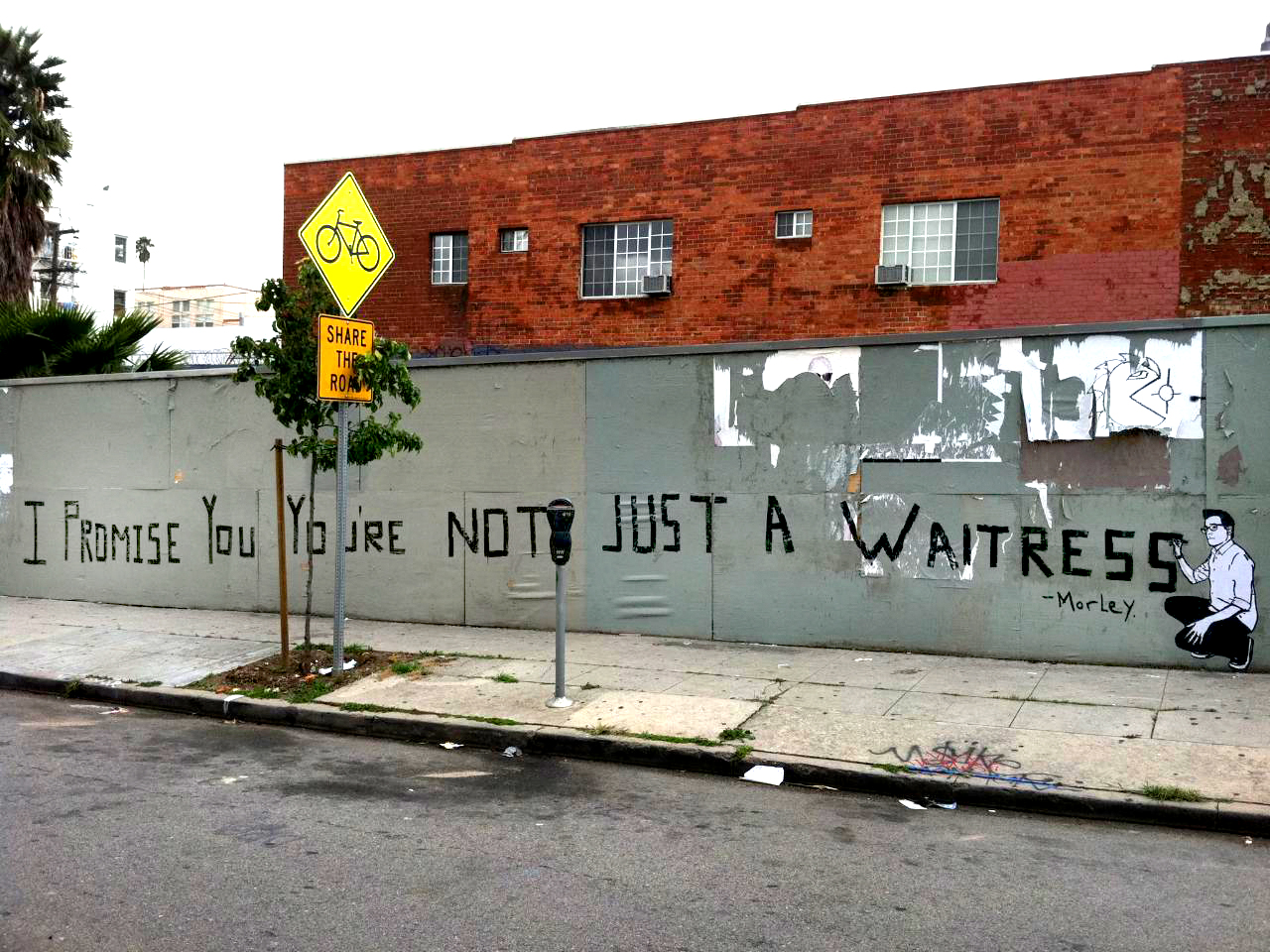
"Waitress" By Morley in Los Angeles, CA.

== Exhibitions ==
Morley's first appearance in a gallery was September 15, 2011 at Post No Bills in Venice, California.

Morley's first solo exhibition "I Don't Make Sense Without You" was in July, 2012 at The Outsiders Gallery in Newcastle, England.
