= Golgo (artist) =

Andreas Hijar, better known as Golgo, is a Mexican street artist who is known for his futuristic artwork and unconventional approaches to mixed media art and clothing designs with his etheric nature. He has been featured in museums internationally.

== Biography ==
Hijar is a Mexican street artist who was born in Mexico City. Hijar fuses many different styles into his artworks. His inspiration is drawn from his Mexican heritage, lucha libre, religion, science fiction, comic books, and popular culture. Hijar is a self-taught artist who would begin doing Graffiti/Street art in Mexico City streets. Hijar later created his own crew in the 1990s called "Da Flow Team family", which is now called "Heavyweights".

He is known for his collaborative efforts with various street brands and art galleries: USSR, American Eagle Outfitters, Nike Dunk, Gorillaz: Demon Days Art Exhibit LA, All City Canvas Art collaboration. He didn't hit his big break until Nike offered him a shoe deal. The first shoe he first developed was the Lucha Dunk High. The shoe was a success internationally although areas like Mexico and the US caught on to the trend much later. Through his collaborative efforts with Nike Hijar would befriend Futura, a world renowned graffiti artist who would later collaborate in the all city canvas with Hijar downtown Mexico City. The image collaborated on was called "detail 7", which was created in 2013. The image features a stencil of a larger-than-life scaled chiseled figured that's overseeing the city with three heads. The light blue hazy background and various orbs floating in the background give the glowing eyed being a strong omnipresence. Hijar and Futura also collaborated on a full-sized bus, another larger-than-life stencil that looks like a superhero, provided by Golgo and the atmospheric expression of Futura (graffiti artist) spray can. Golgo and Futura produce other-worldly images. Hijar is still working with various streetwear brands in his Los Angeles studio and continuing his succession nationally and internationally with his collective art galleries.
