= Royyal Dog =

South Korean street artist

- Born: Chris Chanyang Shim; February 25, 1989 (age 37); South Korea
- Known for: Spray paint art
- Style: Street art

Chris Chanyang Shim (Korean: 심찬양, born February 25, 1989), known as Royyal Dog and formerly Royal Dog, is a South Korean graffiti writer and street artist. He is best known for his photorealistic murals of African American women in traditional Korean hanbok. Shim started gaining recognition in 2016 for his murals featuring rap icons and multiculturalism in the United States.

== Early life and education ==
Shim studied cartoon animation at Chungkang College of Cultural Industries. Wanting to become a missionary to Africa, he began studies in 2011 at the International Evangelical College in the Philippines in Pastoral Studies, but left school in 2013 to pursue painting in Perth, Australia. He draws much of his inspiration from hip hop culture.

== Notable works ==
- "Flower Has Bloomed", 2016 - The Container Yard, Los Angeles, CA
- Michelle Obama, 2019 - 74th Street and Chappel Avenue, Chicago, IL
- Kobe Bryant tribute, 2020 - 400 S. Alameda Ave, Los Angeles, CA
