= 3Steps =

German-based contemporary artist collective

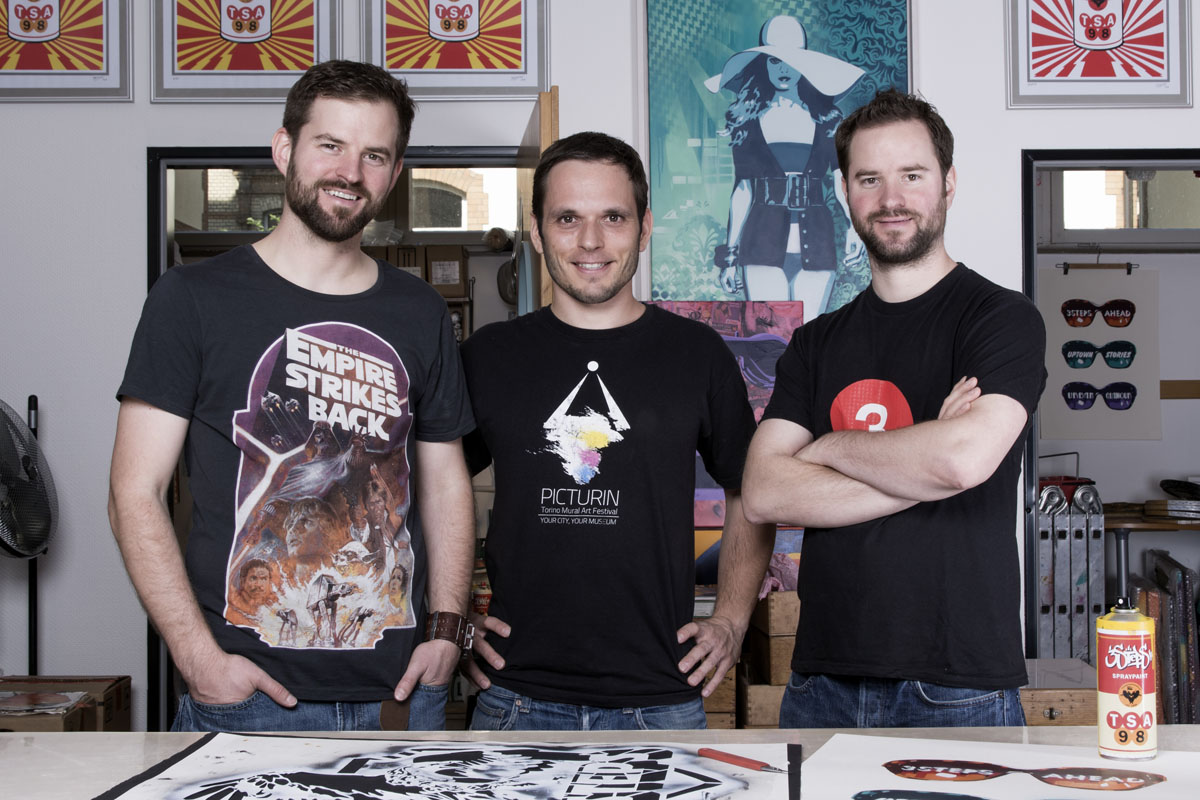
- 3Steps (Kai H. Krieger, Joachim Pitt and Uwe H. Krieger) in its studio (2014)
- Born: Kai H. Krieger, Joachim Pitt and Uwe H. Krieger (1980) founded 1998; Giessen, Hesse Germany
- Known for: Public art, Street art, print making, Pop Art
- Awards: German Cultural and Creative Pilot Award by the Federal Republic of Germany, Berlin 2014; Winner Start Up Weekend Space, with STELLART art for space project, Bremen 2015; Fellow, Ambassador for cultural and creative economy of Germany, Berlin 2016; Ab in die Mitte! Landessieger, RIVER TALES street art festival, awarded by Hessian Ministry of the Environment and Climate Protection, Wiesbaden 2017

3Steps (German pronunciation: [θɹiːˈstɛps]) is a German-based contemporary artist collective between the twins Kai Harald Krieger and Uwe Harald Krieger (born 15 March 1980) and Joachim Pitt (born 8 December 1980).

The works of 3Steps have developed from mural art, graffiti art and street art. The spray can is the central media of 3Steps. The collective paints huge images on facades and murals, as well as several kinds of paintable media in the studio. Bright colors and the reflection of a modern society express the intention of the three friends.

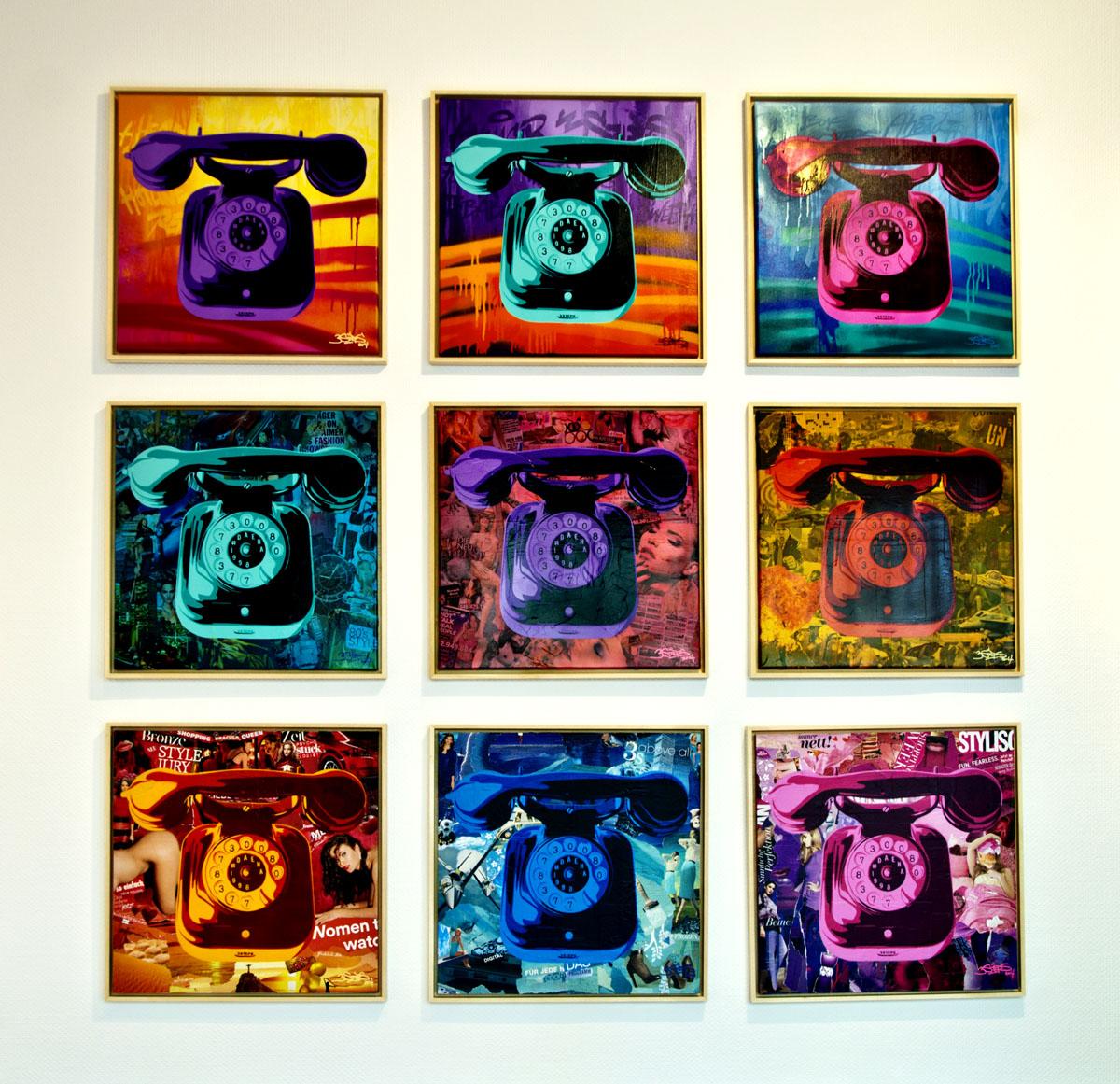
3Steps Telephone Paintings, 2014.

In November 2014 3Steps received the “Kultur- und Kreativpilot Deutschland” (Cultural and Creative pilot of Germany) award by the Federal Republic of Germany. 3Steps lives and works in the University town of Giessen, central Germany.

== Development ==
3Steps was founded in fall 1998. The style of the collective quickly developed from the classic “New York Style Writing” graffiti and high art graffiti to artistic short stories on large-scale murals. The work of 3Steps can be found around the entire globe, from Giessen and Wetzlar via Munich and Berlin to London, Milan, Venice, L.A. and New York.

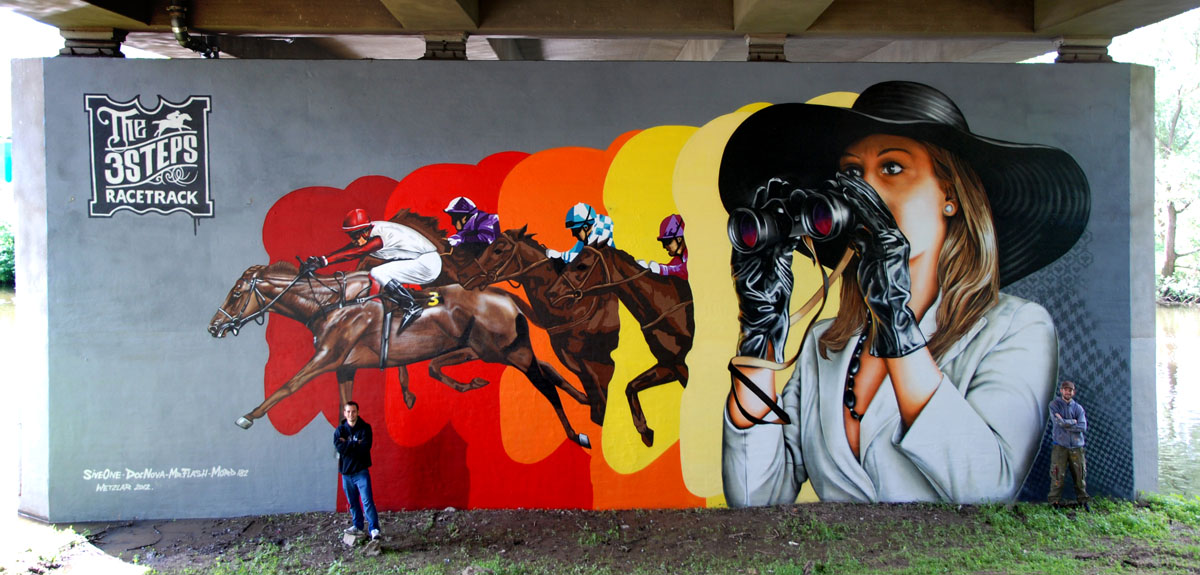
Mural Art "Racetrack" by 3Steps for the Hessentag in Wetzlar, 2012

After completing their university studies with diploma and award-winning PhD, the three friends founded their studio and art space in Giessen in 2012. Since then they devote themselves to new content driven topics and projects. In the studio 3Steps produces fine art paintings, editions and exclusive products.

== Works ==
Today's style of 3Steps includes influences of street art, style writing, photorealism, printmaking and pop art. In their current works 3Steps reflects today’s life, characterized by varying environments from reality, fiction, media and fantasy. The imagery of 3Steps is telling short stories and modern fairy tales. Most of the collective stories based on iconic figures and moments of daily life. 3Steps turns everyday commodities and historic items into modern art. Nature faces urban culture and sunken cities. The works are colorful imageries in which aesthetics and glamor melt with urban culture and adventure.

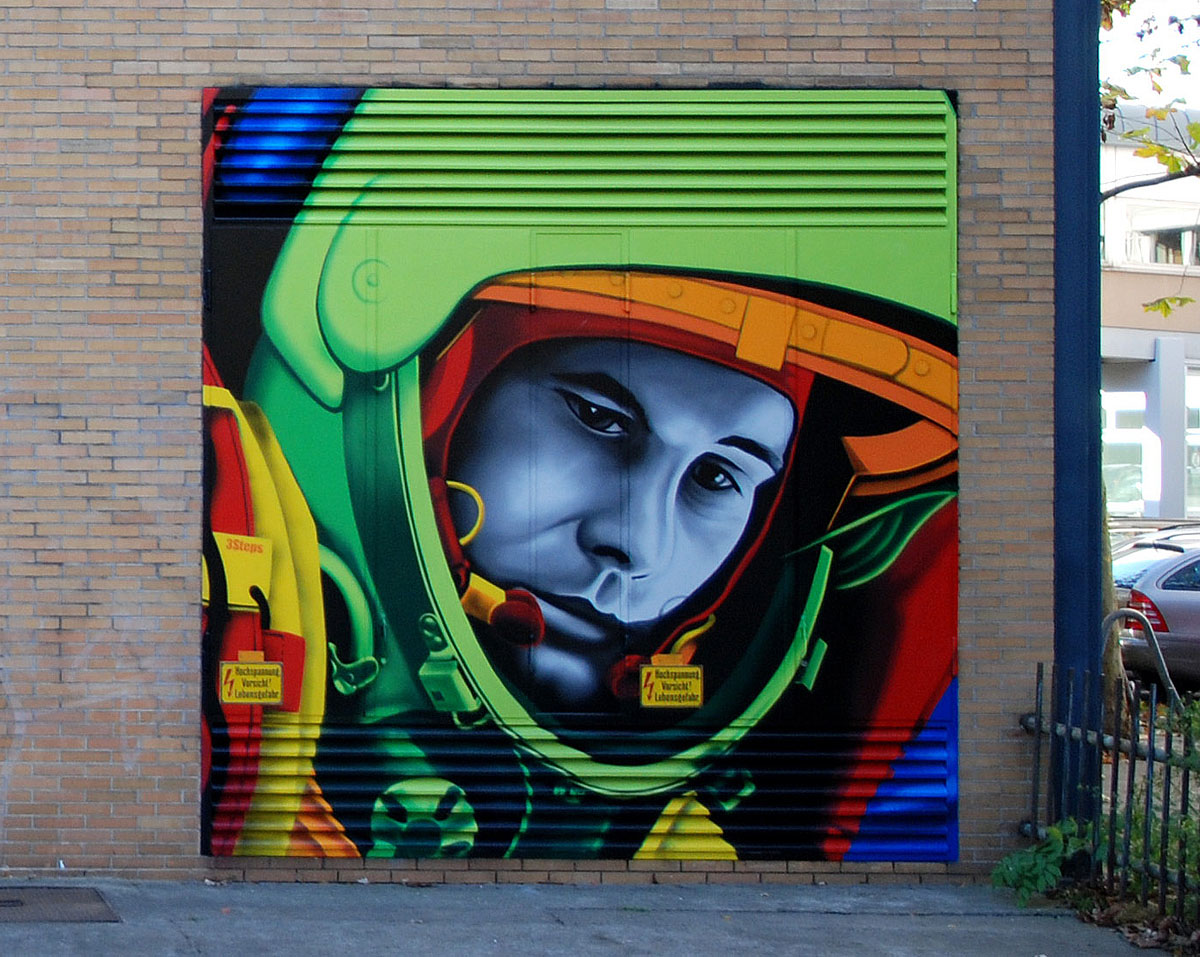
Yuri Gagarin Pop Art Portrait by 3Steps at the THM, 2011.

The body of work of 3Steps contains large scale mural art, street art, paintings on wood and canvas, photographs, screenprints as well as sculptures and installation art. Most of the mixed media paintings consist of a collage of newspapers, magazines, photographs, stencil works, spray paint, acrylic, resin and screen printing on wood and canvas.

== River Tales ==
3Steps is initiator and curator of the international urban art festival River Tales (in German: Flussgeschichten). The goal of the repeatedly funded project is the redevelopment of city, countryside and river by urban mural art and street art. Since 2012 the project grows through the participation of numerous international artists (e.g. Loomit, Dome, Alexander Becherer, 3Steps, Macs and Etnik).

== Scholarships and collections ==
=== Grants and scholarships ===
- 2016: Artist Catalogue Funding, Hessisches Ministerium für Wissenschaft und Kunst, Stadt Giessen and Stadt Wetzlar
- 2015: Kultur- und Künstlerförderung des Landes Hessen, Hessisches Ministerium für Wissenschaft and Kunst
- 2011-2012: Kulturfond Gießen-Wetzlar, Kulturamt Stadt Giessen and Kulturamt Stadt Wetzlar

=== Public collections ===
- Museum für Kommunikation Frankfurt, Frankfurt am Main, Hesse, Germany
- Industrie- und Stadtmuseum, Wetzlar, Hesse, Germany

== Exhibitions ==
=== Selected solo exhibitions ===
- 2017: art KARLSRUHE, One Artist Solo Show Birds of Prey with 2CforArt Gallery, art fair Karlsruhe, DE
- 2016: Fields of Memories, Wetzlarer Kunstverein, Wetzlar, DE
- 2016: Heard on the Street, 2CforArt Gallery, Salzburg, AT
- 2015: Welcome to Milvus County, Kunst in Licher Scheunen, Art Festival, Lich, DE
- 2014: Ahead! a studio show, 3Steps Showroom & Gallery, Giessen, DE
- 2013: East vs. West Coast, Milvus Gallery, Giessen, DE

=== Selected group exhibitions ===
- 2016: Eröffnung, Kunstforum, Laubach, DE
- 2016: 3Steps Booth, COME Fair 2016, Coburg, DE
- 2015: 3Steps Booth, Stroke Ltd. Art Fair, Munich, DE
- 2015: Druckfrisch #3, Galerie am Bahndamm, Giessen, DE
- 2015: Expressions, Galerie Hegemann, Munich, DE
- 2015: AprilApril, Galerie Artikel5, Aachen, DE
- 2014: Goethes Werther, Museum of Wetzlar, DE
- 2014: Stadtbotanik, Galerie am Bahndamm, Giessen, DE
- 2013: East vs. West Coast Galerie S., Aachen, DE
- 2013: Einer von uns. August Bebel und Wetzlar, Museum of Wetzlar, DE
- 2010: 100 Künstler | 100 artists, Museum Zinkhütter Hof, Stolberg Aachen, DE
- 2010: Style needs no color, Pretty Portal, Düsseldorf; Stroke 2 Art Fair, Munich; Bloom Art.Fair 21, Cologne, DE

=== Street art festivals (selected) ===
- 2014: River Tales | Event of Urban Art, Giessen, DE
- 2012: Can!t graffiti festival, Antwerp, DE
- 2012: Urban Device, Grosseto, IT
- 2012: River Tales | Event of Urban Art, Giessen-Wetzlar, DE
- 2011: Can!t graffiti festival 2011, Antwerp, BE
- 2011: IBUg 2011 – Urban Culture Festival, Meerane, DE
- 2009: International Meeting of Styles – State of mind, London, UK
- 2009: Can!t graffiti festival 2009, Antwerp, BE
- 2009: Beyond Materialism, Saloniki, GR
- 2008: Urban Code, Venice, IT
- 2007: International Meeting of Styles – Big Dreamers, New York City, US
- 2007: Brighton Hip Hop Festival – Freedom, Brighton, UK
- 2006: Optical Confusion – Meeting of Mural Art, Wetzlar, DE

== Bibliography ==
=== Bibliography ===
Monographs

- 3Steps: Milvus County. Monographie, Bildband mit zahlreichen Texten in Deutsch und Englisch, Giessen 2016, ISBN 978-3-945991-91-6.
- 3Steps: Birds of Prey. Ausstellungs Katalog, Giessen 2017, ISBN 978-3-945991-81-7.
- Projekt159: Eine Region. Eine Bank. Eine Wand. Monographie, Catalogue for art on architecture, Giessen 2016, ISBN 978-3-94599-159-6.
- 3Steps: Ahead!. Giessen 2015, ISBN 978-3-945991-00-8.

=== Further reading ===
- Iosifidis Kiriakos: Mural Art Vol. 3: Murals on huge public Places around the World. Publikat, Mainaschaff 2010, ISBN 3-939566-28-4, p. 20–21.
- Cristian Campos: 1,000 Ideas for Graffiti and Street Art: Murals, Tags, and More from Artists Around the World l. Rockport Publishers & moamao Publications, Beverly MA/Barcelona 2010, ISBN 978-1-59253-658-0.
- Reinhard Müller-Rode: 3Steps Urban Art. In: Bogart. 4. Jahrgang, Nr. 7, 2011, S. 8–11 (online).
- Style needs no color: Schwarz auf Weiss – Vol. II – Style needs no color. From Here to Fame Publishing, Berlin 2011, ISBN 978-3-937946-06-1, p. 120–121.
- Cristian Campos: Graffiti and Urban Art: Murals, Tags, Stencils and Sticker. Loft Publications & Frechmann Kolon, Barcelona/Köln 2011, ISBN 84-9936-771-2, p. 228–253.
- Artistic career | Karriere mit Kunst. In: Streifzug Magazin. April 2014, p. 37 (online).
- Frank Malt: 100 European Graffiti Artists. Schiffer Pub Co, Atglen PA 2014, ISBN 978-0-7643-4658-3, p. 12–15.

=== Tv and radio reports ===
- Daniela Will: Remarkable Street Artists | Ausgezeichnete Sprayer. tv report, Sat1 17:30LIVE. 2015-01-16, (online).
- Eva Grage: Awarded Street Artists | Ausgezeichnete Sprayer | 3Steps from Giessen. radio report, In: hr2-kultur. 2014-12-20, (online).
