= Gagosh (street artist) =

Street artist

- Born: Tbilisi, Georgia
- Known for: Street art, Graffiti, Mosaics; Street Installations, Street Poetry
- Website: gagosh.org

Gagosh is the pseudonym of a Tbilisi, Georgia-based street artist who creates stencils, installations, street poetry and mosaics. His work protests social issues such as the shortage of green space in Tbilisi, labor rights, unemployment, air pollution, social stigmas, the inconvenience of Tbilisi streets for disabled people, exceeded politics and lack of love in society.

In his installations, Gagosh tries to connect art with technical and IT fields. His works implement cyberart and new media art techniques into street art.

== On gender equality ==
Gagosh has done several murals about gender equality. Two of them, “Neat Writing” and “Let's solve this equation together”, are in Zestaponi, West Georgia where gender problem is still an existing and real issue.

The first mural represents a girl who repeatedly writes on the blackboard the quote from The Knight in the Panther's Skin - “The lion's whelps are equal be they male or female”.

The second one shows a small boy and girl writing together the mathematical equals sign on the wall.

Also, a stencil in the underway pass in front of Tbilisi State University. That painting portrays Georgian female monarch Tamar the Great as a King of Hearts underlining the fact that Tamar was titled as a King not as a Queen.

== On Russian occupation ==
Gagosh has actively protested against Russian occupation of Georgian territory since 2008.

In 2014, he painted the mural “Children know it better!” next to Heroes’ Memorial in Gori. The painting depicts three girls vandalizing soviet tank with graffiti colors. Later on, Russian soldiers keep constantly moving the occupation line further into Georgian territory. So called “Creeping Occupation” still takes place in Gori villages, causing Georgian citizens to lose their agricultural lands and in some cases, even houses people live in. Hence, Gagosh has made a stencil “Occupation on the wheels” that is located in the underground pass of the Heroes’ Square in Tbilisi. The stencil represents masked and armed waiters moving the boarder wire with bar carts, illustrating the “Creeping Occupation” of Georgia.

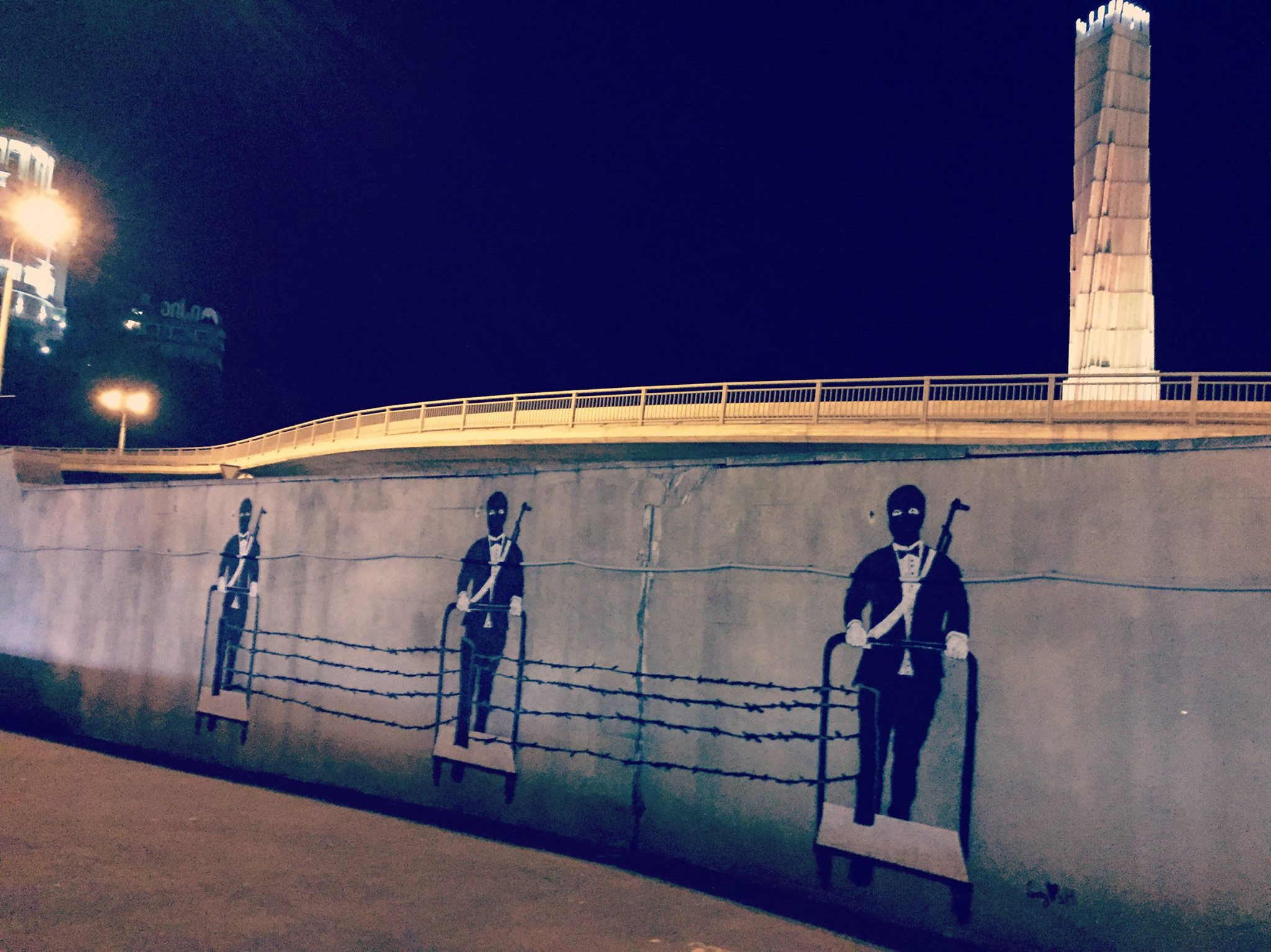
Occupation on the wheels

During the 2018 World Cup in Russia, anti-occupation stencil signed by Gagosh emerged in Tbilisi Old Town. The stencil presents the red FIFA cup placed upon red skulls with text in the bottom “Russia 2008”. On his official website, the author writes: “10 years before Russia2018, the world witnessed the Russia2008 away match in Georgia, played by artillery and troops with disregard for fair play. And still they have not been disqualified?!”

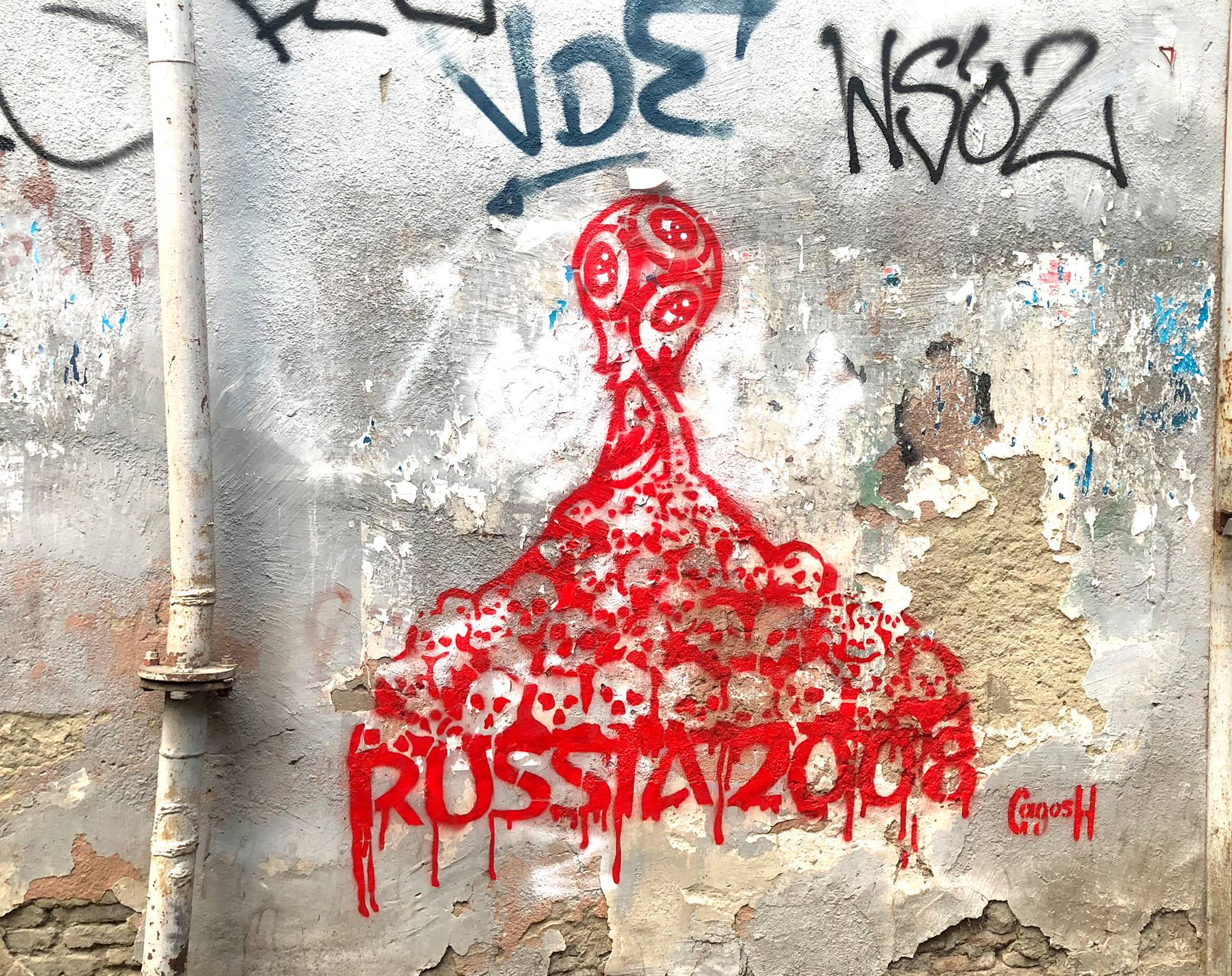
Russia2008

In August 2018, for the 10 years of occupation Gagosh made another anti-occupational mural on the wall of National Parliamentary Library of Georgia named “Wall of August”. The mural is based on the Guernica, prominent work of Picasso as it was created for the response to the bombing of Guernica by Nazi's. “The Wall of August” depicts several tragic themes that were shot during the war days of 2008. The mural conveys several metaphorical elements such as Russian military boots on the Georgian ornamented carpet, bear enters and leaves, the theme and bombs that repetitively contain the digits of 2,0,0,8.

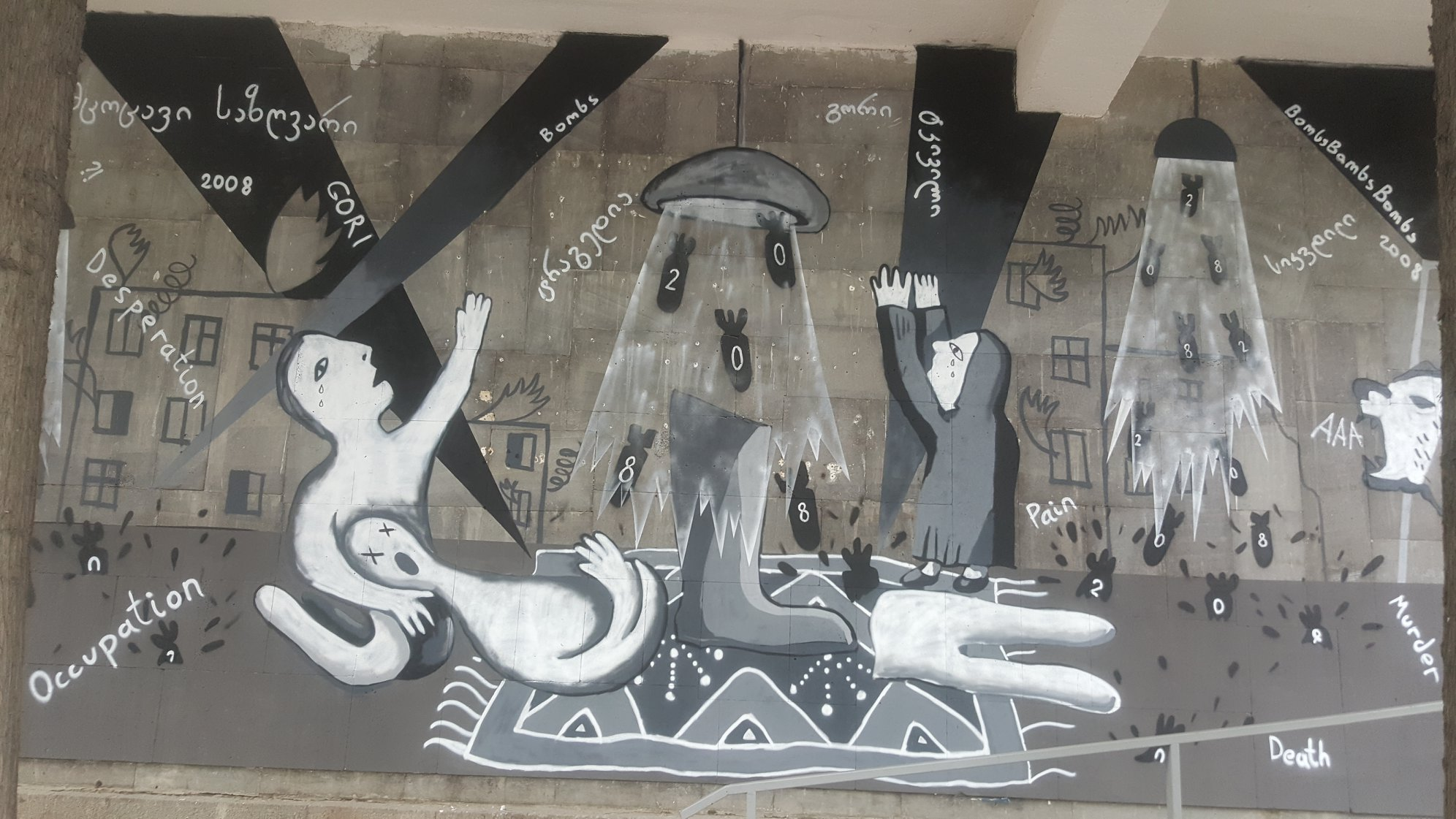
Wall of August
