= ZAM-1 =

Australian graffiti artist and designer

ZAM or "ZAM-1", "Z A M : S.A.C.-1; M.S.A." is the acronym of an Australian Melbourne-based artist and designer, also known for his early pioneering spray-can art (graffiti artist) career during the 1980s.

Z.A.M. initially was a conventional gallery artist during early adolescence (including published book illustrations), before exploring the U.S. graffiti/street art phenomenon in the early 1980s, then later evolving into a contemporary unconventional artist and designer.
