= Martin Whatson =

Stencil Artist

- Born: 1984 (age 41–42)
- Style: Stencil, graffiti

Martin Whatson (born 1984 in Norway) is a Norwegian stencil artist.

== Techniques and styles ==
Martin Whatson creates sculptures, stencils and spray paintings to produce relevant compositions both inside the gallery space and in the arena of public art and Ewalls.

== Exhibitions ==
In 2017, Whatson solo exhibition "Revive", curated by Rom Levy was held in Santa Monica, California.

== Solo exhibitions ==
- 2017 – Revive – Santa Monica / USA
- 2016 – Affinity (collaboration with SNIK) Modus Art Gallery– Paris / France
- 2015 – Old News Galleri-A-Oslo / Norway
- 2015 – About-Face – Blackbook Galle – Denver / USA
- 2014 – Hide & Seek- Rex- London / UK
- 2014 – Nationalteateret- Nationalteateret- Oslo / Norway
- 2014 – Square- Galle- Oslo / Norway
- 2013 – Transformed-Gallery Kawamatsu-okyo / Japan
- 2013 – Undercover-Reed Project-Stavanger / Norway
- 2013 – The Beauty of Grey- MSA Gallery-Paris / France
- 2011 – What have i done? – Black Pop Galler- Copenhagen / Denmark
- 2011 – Love Tour – Gallery Kawamatsu–Tokyo / Japan
