= Erni Vales =

American graffiti artist

Erni
- Born: 1965 (age 59–60); The Bronx, New York City, United States
- Education: High School of Art and Design
- Style: 3D graffiti
- Movement: Graffiti
- Website: ernivales.com

Erni Vales is an American graffiti artist from New York City.

== Early life ==
Vales was born in the Bronx in 1965, and raised in Lower Manhattan.

== Career ==
While attending High School of Art and Design in New York, he made his first artist appearances at Graffiti Productions Inc., one of the first galleries to feature authentic graffiti work of the era. Vales' first professional jobs included graffiti murals in dance clubs in New York.
