= Skullphone =

American artist

- Known for: Artist
- Website: Skullphone.com

Skullphone is an American artist who lives and works in Los Angeles. He first gained notoriety as a street artist in 1999 with a wheatpasted black-and-white skull holding a cell phone, an image described as "eerie, yet smart".

== Origin of the name ==
Skullphone's use of a nickname to sign and promote his artwork was not planned; when his first images appeared, he was referred to as "the guy who does that skull holding a cellphone image you see posted around town", which later was shortened to "that's Skullphone".

== First outdoor works ==
In addition to the repeated image of his signature skull, Skullphone received acclaim for his serial image of a Mobil Pegasus as skeleton, which he attached to condemned gas stations. The intent of his early outdoor work was to blend into existing advertising, signage and architecture. His outdoor stickers were designed to look official in the context of where they were placed by appropriating existing signage with a slight change: adding a small skullphone. Most notable among these stickers were those made for gas pumps, bathrooms and New York City riot gates, which were later displayed in a replicated Skullphone History Museum at the Riverside Art Museum in Riverside, California, in 2008.

== 2008: Outdoor digital billboards controversy ==
In 2008, Skullphone created a stir when his artwork appeared on the first digital billboards that had appeared in Los Angeles, with initial online reports suggesting that the artist had "hacked" the digital billboards. This was rapidly revealed to be untrue, with a Clear Channel representative saying that the ads had been paid for, and another explicitly stating "The advertisement was bought under the assumption that it was art that was in an art show". Some commentators took a negative view of this manipulation, with one proclaiming the artist to be "a phony". Skullphone has neither confirmed nor denied paying for his images to appear on the billboards, stating "I never claimed to have hacked anything, nor have I claimed I didn't."

== Digital Media paintings ==
In 2008, Skullphone debuted his Digital Media series – a series painted specifically for indoor viewing – a departure from the large-scale outdoor work for which he first became known. Skullphone's gallery work is centered on signage and borrows from the worlds of advertising, religion, government and private enterprise, the artist employing a deliberate grid system of red, blue and green paint that mimics LED displays, creating pointillistic images that dislocate when approached. Skullphone describes the philosophy behind his Digital Media paintings as "documenting what is disposable and ephemeral" and claims that the work has its "roots in the street, and is optical, and is pop."

== Publication ==
In 2010, Skullphone was one of the featured artists in Trespass: A History of Uncommissioned Art, a book by the Wooster Collective.
