= Undenk =

Undek
- Website: www.undenk.com

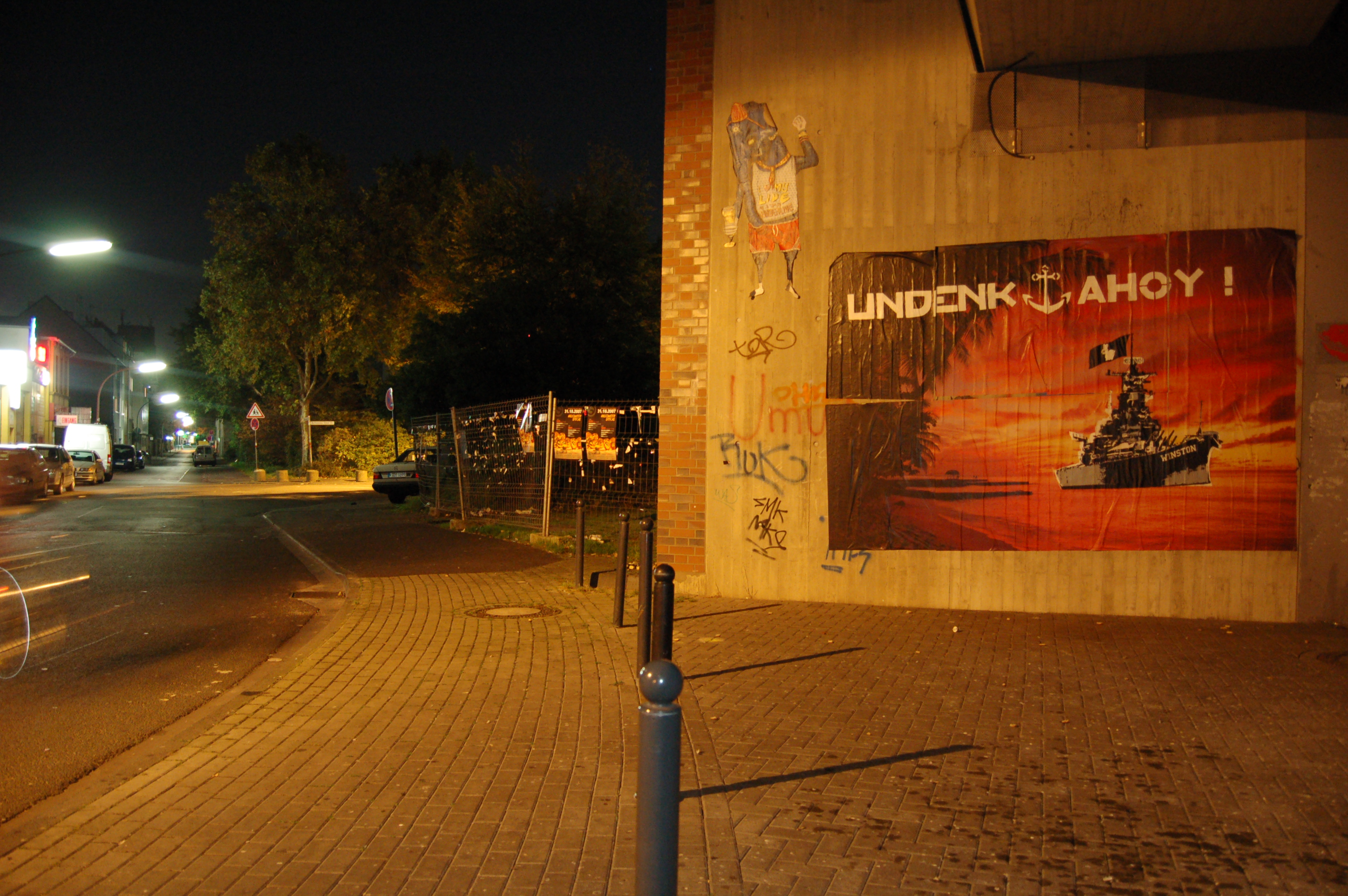
Large Undenk paste-up in Cologne-Ehrenfeld

Undenk is an underground street art group based in Germany and Australia, operating worldwide. Due to its conspiratorial nature, an exact number of members remains unknown.

The origin of the group's name comes from the German translation of the Newspeak term "crimethink", which was used in George Orwell's novel, Nineteen Eighty-Four.

Undenk utilizes both official and unofficial, legal as well as semi-legal means of distributing and publishing its often ironic but usually aims to be sophisticated, controversial and provocative form of progressive art.

== Artforms ==
Undenk's workhorses are stickers, either seemingly self-produced in limited editions or professionally made in large numbers. The stickers are generally displayed in public spaces such as on streets and traffic lights, on walls, trashbins and any other street-bound surface that allows for the pasting of stickers. Other likely locations may or may not include public transportation, public restrooms as well as buildings open to the public, either for entertaining (bars, clubs, sports arenas, concert venues) or administrative (schools, universities, municipal buildings) purposes.

A special mention among the broad variety of Undenk stickers should be given to a design colloquially referred to as "Winston". Winston, also Undenk's trademark, is a stylized white rabbit looking backward over his shoulder, most probably named after the protagonist Winston Smith in Orwell's "Nineteen Eighty-Four". The most common interpretation sees in Winston a reference to the rabbit in Lewis Carroll's "Alice In Wonderland". Winston has been spotted in such places as the Forbidden City of Beijing, New York City's Times Square, at the pyramids of Giza as well as in numerous metropolitan cities like Monaco, San Francisco and Sydney.

Another, yet less common form of Undenk's street-bound activism are stencils and graffiti, also in form of collaborations with other street- and graffiti-artists. In recent times, apparently home-made paste-up posters have been seen in various editions, numbers and designs.

== Exhibitions, further activism and philosophy ==
Parallel to its low-fi, underground street-art, Undenk has participated in and staged several public and official exhibitions. During these exhibitions, in showrooms in Cologne and Berlin and during the "Bread And Butter" fashion weeks of Berlin and Barcelona 2006, the focus has been more on "indoor" artforms such as traditional cotton canvases, painted skateboards and recycled materials such as plain cardboard. Both approaches have the use of stencil-techniques in common.

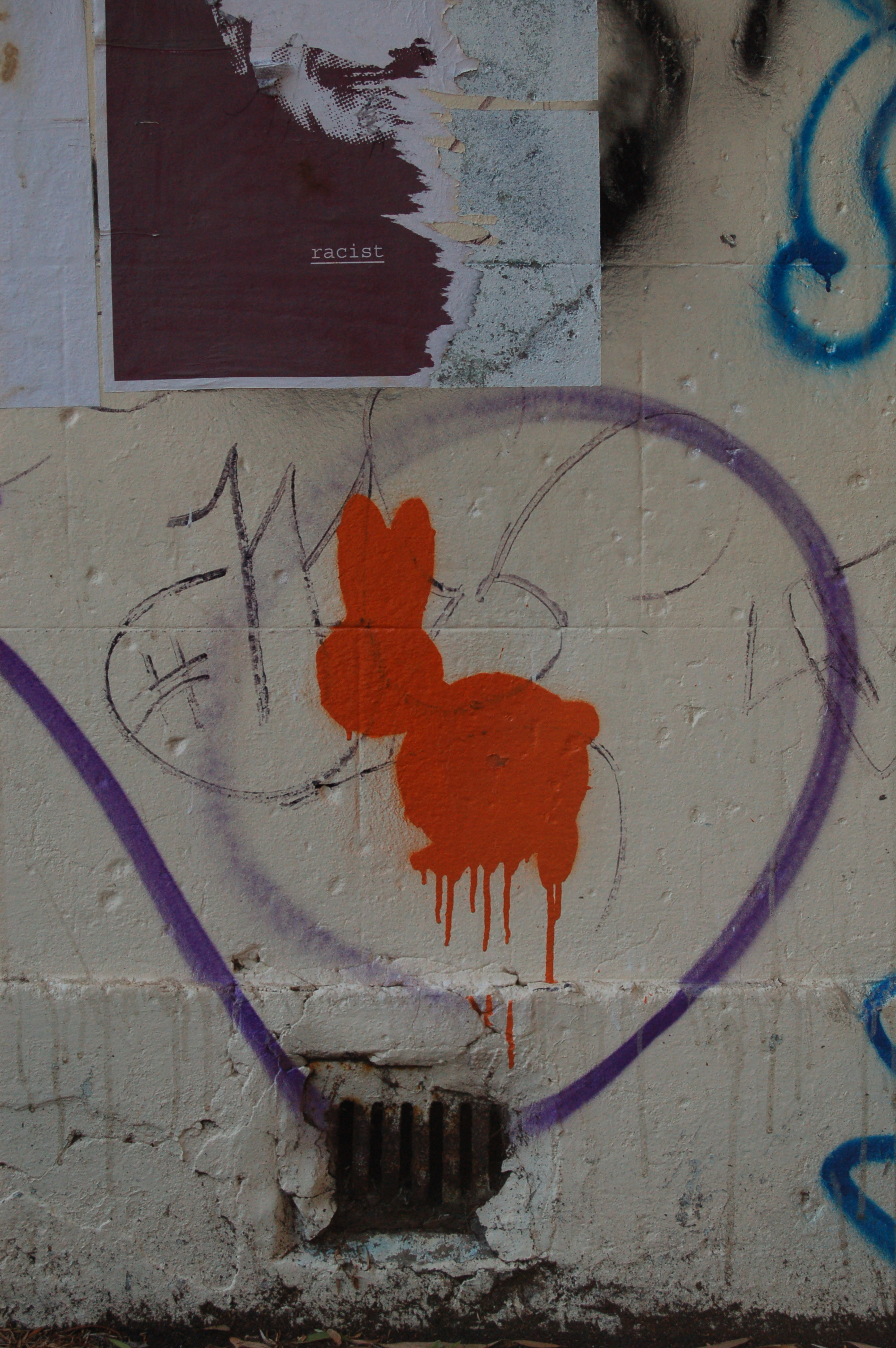
Simple "Winston" stencil in Fitzroy, Melbourne

Furthermore, an edition of T-shirts, displaying one of Undenk's most popular designs had been launched around 2008. Exact dates are not available. Since then various other items of clothing, in small runs, were made available to the public – including hoodies and sweatshirts.

Undenk's art seems to target political and social topics such as globalization, militarism and the evolution of capitalism, by subliminally and wittingly ridiculing and thus criticizing the hypocrisy and cynicism of the 21st century Western industrial society. As a kind of manifesto, Orwell's flagship dystopia "1984" about the struggle of the individual in an overwhelmingly powerful and oppressive society seems to hover as a guideline in the group's approach on today's and tomorrow's developments.

Over the years the movement has expanded its rhetoric across social platforms and in physical stunts. While still maintaining its central 1984 theme, the group tackles ideas of consumerism, misinformation, and the disintegration of reality in populations.
