= Scape Martinez =

American artist

- Born: Edward Martinez; Newark, New Jersey
- Other names: "SCAPE"
- Occupations: Artist and writer
- Website: www.iamscapemartinez.com

Scape Martinez, born Edward Martinez in Newark, New Jersey and raised in the San Francisco Bay Area, is an artist and writer known for his abstract paintings and his graffiti art. The name Scape stands for Screaming Creative And Positive Energy. He currently lives and works in the San Francisco Bay Area.

== Career ==
Martinez began his career as a graffiti artist in the Bay Area in the late 1980s and early 1990s. In the late 1990s Martinez transitioned from street art to studio painting using spray paint and acrylics to create large scale abstract paintings.

In 2008, Martinez completed a large digital mural project for the City of San Jose, California in collaboration with SPARC (Social and Public Art Resource Center).

Martinez is also a founding partner of the internet start-up TapSmack.com.

== Books ==
In 2009, Martinez wrote the book "GRAFF The Art and Technique of Graffiti", published by IMPACT Books. This book is the first "how-to" for graffiti art. The book is a guide on how to create graffiti art. Elements of graffiti style are presented in sequence, with successive images showing the development and variations of forms and styles. In 2011 Martinez wrote a sequel, "Graff 2: Next Level Graffiti Techniques" as a follow-up to the earlier title with more emphasis on developing style as an artist. In 2012, Martinez published a "Graff Color Workbook" as a follow-up.

In 2013, Martinez authored his fourth book "COLORMASTER". The book is a breakdown of how Martinez uses color in his current work, with a focus on abstract expressionism.
