= Priz-One =

Graffiti tag

PRIZ-ONE (born Ramon Augustine Martinez in Cuba on August 25, 1964) is the graffiti tag of a Cuban-American commercial artist, illustrator, and ex-golden glove boxer.

PRIZ-ONE Tag

== History ==
Martinez's parents immigrated to New York City during the turbulent Castro era. Martinez started street bombing under various aliases such as RM/MR, SWAN-ONE, PRISM as well as PRIZM, above ground and below Riverside Park. He started "motioning" on the inside of an IRT Broadway no. 1 train in the summer of 1979. His self-taught progression to painting subway car exteriors did not reach its full potential until several years later. While attending P.S. 9 located on the Upper West Side, he became heavily influenced by Dean, Jean13 and other writers from Brandeis High School, who would later be known as "BYB", the Bad Yard Boys.

His tag pseudonym of Priz/Priz-One originated from the Prisma font of a letterset/typography book that was given as a gift by his high school art teacher because of the potential the teacher saw in Martinez's black books.

In the early 1980s Martinez was befriended by STAN-ONE, an older seasoned Broadway writer who was also president of a well-known graffiti crew called TS5/TSF (The Spanish Five). Martinez began teaming up with several members of TS5 on writing ventures and gaining access to layups and yards. Throughout his writing career he would be accepted into numerous graffiti crews. In the late 1980s Martinez was granted membership to Cool Art Creators (CAC), where he still holds a prominent role.

Though his passion is for his artform, he has broadened his vision by presenting works in books and video. Priz-One has been interviewed for several websites, ezines and in The New York Times.

He is Vice President of TS5 and continues to paint legally commissioned murals throughout the five boroughs with his partner STAN-ONE.
