= CutUP Collective =

CutUP (also known as CutUP Collective) is a group of London-based artists, whose work mainly revolves around the manipulation of billboard advertisements. Their first works consisted of removing a billboard, painstakingly cutting it up into roughly 4000 small rectangles, each one in essence a pixel, and then reassembling the billboard.

More recently, CutUP have started other projects, such as replacing small bus-shelter advertisements with a drilled sheet of wood. The illuminating back lights that turn on at dusk reveal an image, as the many holes light up against the dark background.

Although they mainly deal with art on the street, the group have also created installations, including setting 96 different alarm clocks one a minute apart and sound installations, made up of 94 speakers, mini disks and circuit boards.

== Shows and exhibitions ==
Cutup have held shows in London, New York and Barcelona, including two shows at London's Seventeen Gallery, including a recent show which exhibited a full size billboard and a bus shelter, brought inside especially for the show, as well as related video and film pieces.

Other shows have included "La Vida Te Espera" at NIU Gallery, Barcelona in June 2006, "Satellites", at Tanya Bonakdar Gallery, New York and a show at the Kemistry Gallery in Shoreditch.

== Members ==
Vicky Thornton, Jim Woodall and Marc Raue were among the founding members of CutUP.

== See also ==
- Guerilla art
- List of street artists
- Graffiti
- Street art
- Wooster Collective
