= Rubin415 =

Graffiti artist

Rubin415 also known as "Rubin" is a graffiti artist residing in Brooklyn, New York. Rubin comes from Gothenburg, Sweden and is Finnish by heritage.

Rubin's murals can be seen in Scandinavia and in several cities throughout the US and in the greater New York City area. His style is connected to the graffuturism movement and he's known for his abstract, geometric and minimalistic style.

In the fall of 2013 Rubin participated in the Aqueduct Racetrack mural project. In the spring of 2014 Rubin painted a large mural outside the Domino Sugar Factory in Williamsburg, Brooklyn as part of the "Domino Walls"-project and under curatorial advisement by Brooklyn Street Art.

Rubin has also collaborated with Vice Magazine, Heineken, and MTV, among others.

Rubin also produces prints and wood panels and he has been part of several group shows in the US. In the spring of 2014 he participated in the Succulent Studios art space Palabra group show in Greenpoint, Brooklyn, showcasing his 8 x 8 installation "Rubin's cube".

In the spring of 2014 Rubin collaborated with the Scandinavian fashion brand COMMON for the brands SS14-collection.
