= Czon =

Swedish street artist

- Style: Guerrilla art
- Movement: Street art
- Website: Czon on Instagram

Czon (aka Czon von Underground) is a pseudonymous Swedish-based artist who works with images, street art, guerilla-art and installations. His works of political and social commentary have been featured by his own created "Underground Girl" on streets, walls all around Europe and also on watchtowers in the old DDR.

== Underground will take over ==
Czon is the leader of the art collective "Underground will take over" with members from all over Sweden, all of them anonymous.

== Major exhibitions (2011–2014) ==
- 2014 Hallands Art Museum in Halmstad Sweden "Witches"
- 2014 Artbase Teufelsberg in Berlin, Germany (permanent exhibited)
- 2014 Ostseebad Kunsthalle in Kuhlungsborn, Germany
- 2013 Artist in residence in Mecklenburg, Germany
- 2013 Galleri Polar Stern in Kuhlungsborn, Germany "Czon & the German Riviera"
- 2013 Hallands Art Museum in Halmstad, Sweden "Spring Saloon"
- 2013 Småland Museum in Växjö, Sweden "Blood, vampires & werewolwes"
- 2012 Halland Museum of Cultural History in Varberg-Sweden "Vampires, zombies, sexuality & blood magic"
- 2011 Galleri Blå Porten in Öland, Sweden "Seductives Essence"
