= Neve (artist) =

Italian artist

Neve (born Danilo Pistone, 17 October 1986) is an Italian muralist and visual artist, considered one of the most significant exponents of neo-muralism and street art in Italy.

== Biography ==
Neve was born in Turin, where he began painting as a graffiti writer on walls and trains in 1995. At the start of the 2000s, having moved to Milan, he began to explore urban interventions beyond graffiti, moving towards what would later be defined as street art.

In the early 2000s, he produced works with strong social and political messages — including the Why poster series in support of Tibetan monks and a David depicted with a keffiyeh, also posted in Gaza — and experimented with conceptual urban performances and installations. Among these, Street Commando (2008) attracted media attention: the artist placed cardboard military vehicles and cluster bomb-shaped balloons across Milan.

In 2008 he graduated with honours (110/110 cum laude) in Visual Arts from the Nuova Accademia di Belle Arti (NABA) in Milan, presenting the free-press publication Detriti, supervised by Marcello Maloberti.

That same year he exhibited in a two-person show with Ozmo at the Galleria Magrorocca in Milan and, with the Int 55 collective, participated in Scala Mercalli, then considered the largest exhibition of street art in Italy.

=== Neo-muralism ===
With the mural No Future Falls from Sky (2008), Neve produced one of the earliest figurative neo-muralist works in Italy, establishing his distinctive visual language.

From 2008 onwards he painted across Europe, becoming one of the most widely recognised Italian neo-muralists. Among his most significant mural works: Diamonds (2009), God Save Us Vandals (2010), Uriel (2012), Carità Romana (2013), Sant'Ambrogio (2014), Narciso (2014), Atlante e Pandora (2015), La Morte della Vergine (2016), Leucosia (2017), Dafne (2019), San Rocco (2019).

Over the years he has collaborated with numerous brands — including Campari, Fabriano, Eni Syndial, E-distribuzione, IKEA, Michelin, and Banco BPM — producing mural interventions consistent with his style.

From 2020 his activity expanded significantly on an international level, with murals in India, Tunisia, Mongolia and Peru. On the institutional side, in 2021 he was commissioned by E-Distribuzione (Enel Group) to create Le Cabine del Paradiso (The Cabins of Paradise), a cycle of nine electrical distribution cabins each inspired by a canto of Dante's Paradiso, on the occasion of the 700th anniversary of the poet's death, under the patronage of the Italian Ministry of Culture. In 2024 he participated with a live painting at the G7 ministerial summit for Agriculture, organised by Confagricoltura in Siracusa. In February 2026, a work from his Cabine d'Autore × Giro d'Italia series (Riflessi, Imperia) was the subject of a double-page feature in Corriere della Sera.

=== Paintings and gallery work ===
Neve produces studio works primarily in pencil on MDF, a technique that references the texture of spray on walls. The black background — from which the artist describes "bringing forth only light" — is a consistent element of both his mural and studio practice.

In 2011 his works were exhibited in Düsseldorf alongside those of Giorgio de Chirico. In 2015, a two-person exhibition with Peeta was held at the Galo Art Gallery.

His work has been shown at venues including: (Con)Temporary Art (Superstudio Più, Milan, 2010); the Venice Biennale — Padiglione Italia, curated by Vittorio Sgarbi (2011); ST-ART, Strasbourg (2014); Street is Culture, London (2015).

From 2017 to 2019 he exhibited with the international gallery Galeries Bartoux.

=== Other ===
In 2015, the VI Municipality of Rome renamed the municipal kindergarten at Via Paternò 24, Borghesiana, the Scuola dell'Infanzia "Neve", following his 40-metre anti-racism mural Gli occhi dei bambini on its wall — depicting in black and white, with vivid eyes, five children from five different continents.

Having grown up in difficult circumstances in Turin's outskirts with a widowed mother, Neve has been notably active in producing charitable works: in support of abandoned children, children with type 1 diabetes, the homeless at Casa Jannacci, and migrants. In 2019, he dedicated a mural in Lampedusa to the victims of the 3 October 2013 shipwreck.
