= Olek (artist) =

Polish-born artist, born 1978

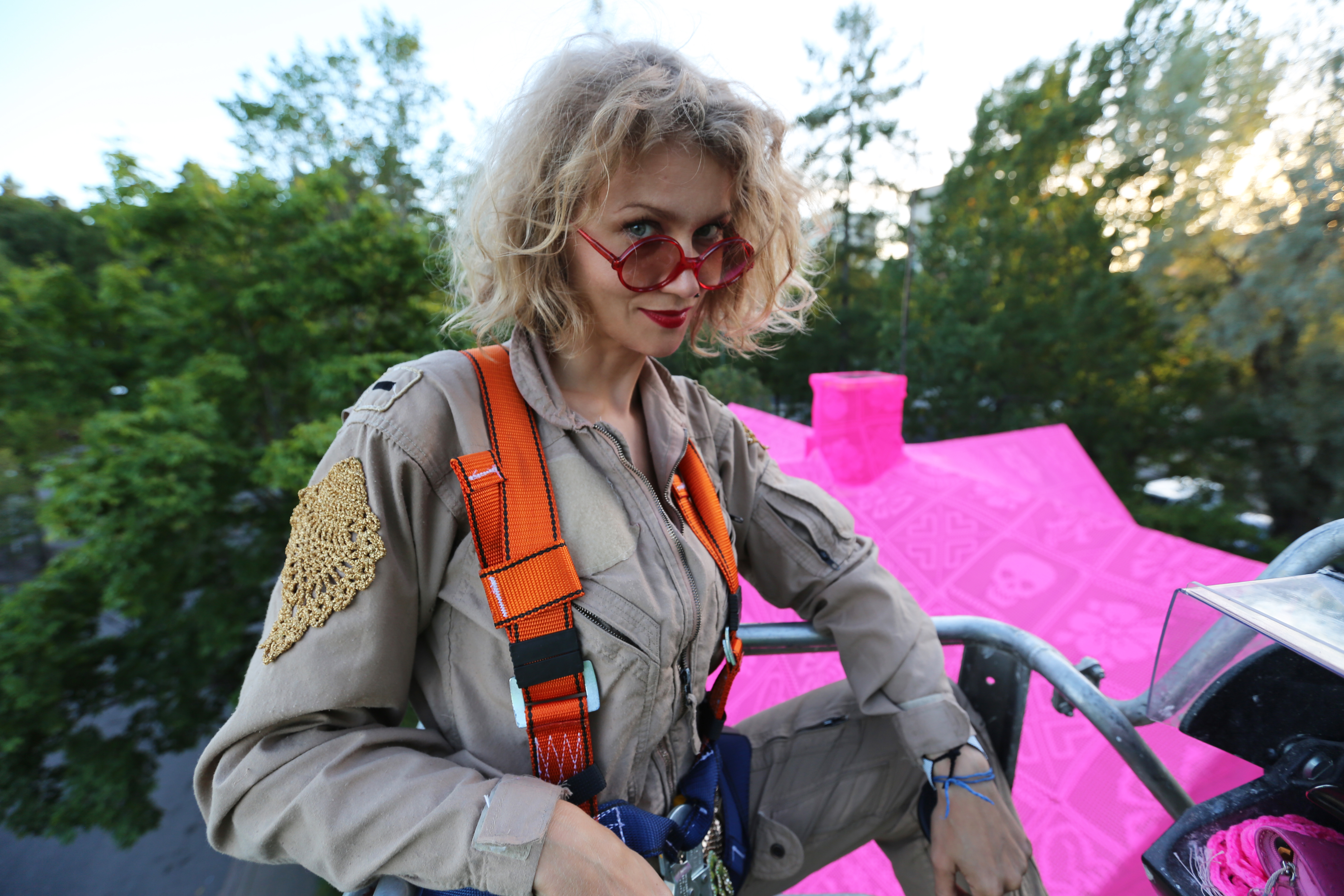
- Olek in 2016
- Born: Agata Oleksiak; 5 April 1978 (age 48); Ruda Śląska, Poland (Note: Olek is sometimes listed as being from Silesia, Poland; Ruda Śląska is a city within the administrative division of Silesia.)
- Education: Adam Mickiewicz University
- Known for: performance, installation, sculpture, fibre art
- Patrons: National Endowment for the Arts, Fund for Creative Communities

Agata Oleksiak (born 5 April 1978), known as Olek, is a Polish artist who is based in New York City. Their works include sculptures, installations such as crocheted bicycles, inflatables, performance pieces, and fiber art. They have covered buildings, sculptures, people, and an apartment with crochet and have exhibited in the United States, United Kingdom, Germany, Brazil, Turkey, France, Italy, Poland, and Costa Rica.

== Early life and career ==
Olek graduated with a degree in Cultural Studies from Adam Mickiewicz University, Poznań, Poland, in 2000. They then attended LaGuardia College, where they won the National Arts Club's award for sculpture. Their early work included sculptures, costumes, and inflatables.

Olek first used crocheting as part of their art in 2003 after moving to the United States. They "wowed critics" at the Williamsburg Arts and Historical Society Surrealist Fashion Show that year. In 2004, Olek created "a large tentlike piece made of crocheted strips of cloth, hair, cassette tape and stuffed animals" work for a four-person show. The New York Times said this work gave the show at 5BE Gallery in Chelsea, Manhattan, "a tour-de-force center to work around." Their crocheted sculpture Spill (2005), featured in the Washington Post, included 1,300 skinny white balloons cascading in an "intestinal shape". They participated in The Waterways, a "socially conscious" art project on a vaporetto water bus during the 2005 Venice Biennale; their work, called Camouflage, "exploring the androgyny of fixed identity, sexuality, and culture". In September and October of that year, Olek crocheted the windows of a burned-out, abandoned building near their artist residency in Utica, New York. During this period, their costumes for theatre and dance performances drew critical praise, although a dance performance relating to one of their sculptures was criticized.

== Philosophy ==
Olek's creative philosophy is that "Life and art are inseparable." In 2009, they stated:

I think crochet, the way I create it, is a metaphor for the complexity and interconnectedness of our body and its systems and psychology. The connections are stronger as one fabric as opposed to separate strands, but, if you cut one, the whole thing will fall apart. Relationships are complex and greatly vary situation to situation. They are developmental journeys of growth, and transformation. Time passes, great distances are surpassed and the fabric which individuals are composed of compiles and unravels simultaneously.

As a supporter of women's rights and freedom of expression, Olek has used the appeal of their work to display their solidarity with those living under oppressive laws and governments worldwide. Through their body of work, Olek seeks to bring color and life, energy, and surprise to the living space.

== Selected works ==
Olek has exhibited in the United States, United Kingdom, Germany, Brazil, Turkey, France, Italy, Spain, Finland, Sweden, Poland, and Costa Rica. In 2009 and 2016, they were a resident artist at Brazil's Instituto Sacatar.

Olek's crocheted full body clothing, dubbed "wearable sculptures", has been used in various projects where Olek took their participants onto the New York City Subway. Olek's DUMBO Arts Festival piece was "Painting to Shake Hands" on an "event score" in Yoko Ono's Grapefruit. Participants wore their sculptures and placed a hand through a stretched canvas to shake the hands of passers-by. A second performance was dubbed "Crocheted Grapefruit". Performance piece "Thank You for Your Visit, Have a Nice Day", performed on Manhattan's 14th Street during the 2009 event, Art in Odd Places:SIGN, was inspired "by a uniformed attendant holding a "Hold the Handrail" sign in a Taipei metro station". Performers held placards based on signs noticed by Olek that were "emphatic, ironic or amused dialogue with their location."

Their first solo exhibition, "Knitting is for Pus****", was held at Christopher Henry Gallery. In 2010 they exhibited a false apartment in which the contents, including the residents, were covered in crocheting. The installation took years to prepare using yarn skeins. It was originally scheduled to run from 9 September to 17 October 2010, but closed in May 2011 after a series of extensions. During that period, the gallery exhibited their work at the SCOPE Art Show in Miami. In this and other works, members of the public or the media were included, crocheted directly into suits without traditional fasteners. According to the gallery, after the exhibition closed the work was priced at $90,000.

In late December 2010, Olek installed a crocheted suit over "Charging Bull" (1989), a statue on Wall Street, as a tribute to Arturo Di Modica, who installed the sculpture without permission. A park caretaker tore the suit from the statue two hours later. Olek was the 2010-2011 Workspace artist-in-residence at the Lower Manhattan Cultural Council, during which they created and performed at the Whitney Museum of American Art. In May 2011, they won the "Sculpture In Situ" category at the second Urban Arts Awards (Artaq).

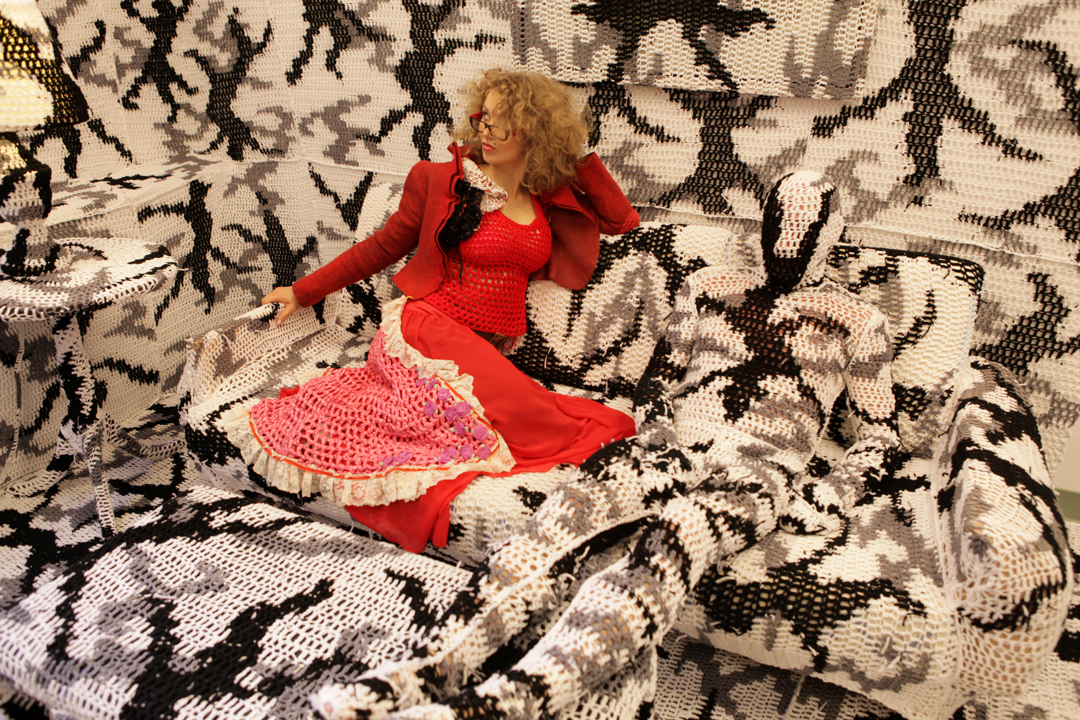
Olek in their installation Homage to Keith Haring, 2011

In August 2011, Olek held a solo exhibition at Jonathan LeVine Gallery. They collaborated with director Gina Vecchione and producer Michelle Price to create a short silent film called YARNANA, through Kickstarter-based fundraising. "Inspired by the silent film genre, it relies solely on powerful music, sound design and physical expression. The characters speak through modern dance, physical comedy, capoeira, martial arts, poi, belly dancing, breakdance, acrobatics, gymnastics and the instincts of soul searchers." The project's funding was ultimately canceled on Kickstarter, but the film was still created, and it won a film festival award. Their first solo exhibition in the United Kingdom, called "I do not expect to be a mother but I do expect to die alone", was influenced by their experiences while they lived there.

Olek changed materials for a joint exhibition with David E. Peterson in New York City; they used thousands of semi-inflated balloons, crocheted like yarn to create a cave-like structure inside the gallery. The artist noted their love of the ephemeral nature of the medium; the balloons often popped during the creation of the installation, and required immediate repair to prevent it unraveling entirely. The installation will gradually wither. They said that balloons represent "the happiest moments in life — which are often just as impermanent". Some visitors noted a pungent scent of latex. Olek was inspired by their time as a traveling clown for Health Plus, when they would visit poor New York neighborhoods. They had previously used balloons during their residency in Brazil.

They were included in the Renwick Gallery's 2012–2013 40 under 40: Craft Futures.

In 2014, as one of a number of underwater crocheted works produced in collaboration with PangeaSeed to draw attention to threats to the oceanic ecosystem, Olek covered a bomb-shaped sculpture at the Cancún Underwater Museum in Mexico with a crocheted "cosy"; the museum complained that this had harmed aquatic life. In 2015, as part of St+Art Delhi 2015, they covered a women's shelter in Delhi with crochet to raise awareness of its existence among those who need it.

In April 2016, they draped the facade of Virginia MOCA with a giant crocheted New York Times front page, dated 2020 and featuring ecologically themed good news stories. Also in 2016, they created an installation at Verket, a museum in Avesta, Sweden, and was aided by Syrian and Ukrainian women refugees; after hearing their stories, they were inspired to cover a house in Avesta and another in Kerava, Finland, entirely with pink crochet to illustrate the power of women. While working in Avesta, the refugee women described their stories of how they had lost everything during the war. This motivated Olek to create a short film, "In the Blink of an Eye," where they exploded a crocheted house inside the Verket Museum. On 3 November 2016, a pink blanket crocheted by Olek and thirty-eight volunteers, featuring Hillary Clinton's face and the hashtag #ImWithHer in black and white, was nailed to a billboard in New Jersey. In December 2016, Olek exhibited the piece entitled, "You Can't Fool All The People," at MANA Wynwood in Miami.

== 2011 arrest ==
On 6 October 2011, Olek and a man were involved in an incident in a bar in London. Charged with unlawful wounding, unlawful wounding with intent to cause grievous bodily harm and two counts of possessing a bladed article in a public place, Olek was tagged with an ankle monitor, was under house arrest for over a month, but was allowed to attend a show in Poland. In September 2012 at Southwark Crown Court, they were found not guilty of unlawful wounding with intent to cause grievous bodily harm, but guilty of unlawful wounding; the following November they were sentenced to home curfew. After serving their sentence, they installed a crochet piece with the message "kiss the future" on "5 block[s] of Hell in Vancouver" and then a 65-foot crochet banner with the same message in Polish in a prison in Katowice.
