= Civilian (street artist) =

Australian graffiti artist

- Born: Tom Civil
- Occupation: street artist
- Years active: About late 2001 – present

Civilian is the pseudonym of Tom Civil, a street artist, operating out of Melbourne, Australia, who has been profiled as a "leading player" of "the city's vibrant stencil art scene".

== Career ==
Civilian started painting stencils around the end of 2001.

In the documentary film Rash (2005), Civil spoke of his approach to street stenciling..."It's something I'll plan and kind of go on a mission by myself and kind of do as much as I can when I feel like it. It's not necessarily so much to do with the mood or whatever. It's more when the times right".

He has had several art works exhibited in gallery shows, but says he is not entirely comfortable in those settings; preferring to do work in "Empty Shows" – illegal exhibitions held in derelict buildings. In 2003, police caught Civilian at the Canterbury "Empty Show". No criminal charges were laid by police. Civilian feels that "street art is an important and necessary part of society".

Despite Civilian's past discomfort with gallery settings, the National Gallery of Australia has acknowledged Civilian's contribution to the Australian Urban Art Movement. In 2010, his work was included in "Space Invaders", an exhibition of Australian street artists which opened October 2010 and was to travel nationally over the next two years.

== See also ==
- List of Australian artists
- List of people from Melbourne
- List of street artists
- Spray paint art
- Types of graffiti
