= Adam Himebauch =

American graffiti artist

- Born: April 11, 1983 (age 43)
- Known for: street art, contemporary art, performance art
- Website: https://www.himebauch.live/

Adam Himebauch is a contemporary painter, performance and installation artist. Himebauch began his career as a New York City street artist and parodist using the pseudonym Hanksy. Beginning in 2022, Himebauch began working under his actual name.

== Work as Hanksy ==
As Hanksy, Himebauch is recognized for painting pun-themed work related to popular culture on the street; for instance, combining the body of Banksy's classic rat with a cartoon face of actor Tom Hanks. The image went viral on social media, encouraging Hanksy to develop and expand his portfolio of popular culture mashup puns. Between 2011 and 2017, Hanksy created hundreds of images of visual wordplay and celebrity that he pasted on the streets, and painted on canvases that were exhibited across the country. Banksy has yet to comment on the parody; however, Tom Hanks is supportive of the work and shared a photograph posing next to Hanksy on his Twitter account.

In 2015 he made work critical of Donald Trump's run for President of the United States. The image he created in protest, dubbed Dump Trump by the Huffington Post, depicted the then candidate as a cartoonish pile of feces with flies encircling his head. The image became one of the most recognizable pieces of art created in response to the election season. Days before Trump was inaugurated into office in 2017, Hanksy's mural in New York was removed because the owners of the building were nervous to keep it up after Trump was sworn into office.

Hanksy's work has been discussed in numerous publications including: The New York Times, Rolling Stone, Los Angeles Magazine and The Washington Post and in 2016, a documentary series related to his installation Surplus Candy aired on Ovation TV. In 2021, three years after retiring his Hanksy persona, the artist released a collection of Hanksy NFT's on OpenSea.

=== Installations ===
In addition to his street and canvas art, Hanksy has created several interactive installations meant to engage his audience in innovative and participatory ways.

==== Surplus Candy (2014-ongoing) ====
Sparked by the success of the Best of the Worst installation, Hanksy began his Surplus Candy initiative—highly interactive events that he has hosted in multiple cities including New York City and Los Angeles. In each installment, Hanksy secures an abandoned space, transforming it with art and activity, then opens that space up to the public for only a couple of hours before taking it down. In 2014, when he first hosted Surplus Candy in Manhattan, Hanksy included twenty other artists. In 2015, when he installed the show in a dilapidated mansion in the historic West Adams district in Los Angeles, over 90 artists were involved. These temporary exhibitions were among the first virtual reality (VR) art experiences. Nicolas Heller filmed and directed a show entitled Surplus Candy to document the installations and process.

==== Best of the Worst (2015) ====
In 2015, Hanksy mounted an interactive exhibition entitled Best of the Worst that featured some of his signature pun pieces, including portraits of Bill Murrito, Hamuel L. Jackson, Kanye Brest, Traylor Swift, Pikajew, Drak-o Malfoy and Mile E. Coyote. In addition to exhibiting his own work, Hanksy showcased pieces by fellow street artists, built a functional skateboarding ramp, included a photo booth, arcade games, balloon artist and a live-DJ.

To generate awareness of the exhibition and active interest in attending, Hanksy created Golden Tickets that he hid throughout Manhattan, teasing their location on social media. A homage to the 1971 fantasy film, Willy Wonka and the Chocolate Factory, these tickets introduced the interactive nature of the event but also could be traded in for a limited edition work by the artist. The exhibition itself took place at a former Chase Bank on the Lower East Side that Hanksy transformed to look like a street in Chinatown.

=== TV series ===
To preserve a record of Hanksy's temporary installations, Ovation TV launched a six-episode series called "Hanksy Presents: Surplus Candy."

== Work as Adam Himebauch and Adam Lucas ==
Working under the names Adam Lucas and Adam Himebauch rather than his street art moniker, Himebauch maintains his signature humor and interest in conceptual art, performance and perception. As Adam Lucas, the artist painted colorful and geometric murals throughout Manhattan that evoke the aesthetic of American painter Stuart Davis.

=== Back to the Future, 2022 ===
In 2022, Himebauch created an immersive conceptual performance, fabricating the retrospective of an iconic artist from the 1970s and 1980s who happened to be himself aged by decades. Using faux archival footage, grainy photographs and advertisements for exhibitions that never took place and textbooks that were never written, Himebauch tested the boundaries of expectations and reality, of past and present and art and artifice.

=== Never Ever Land, 2024 ===
In 2024, Himebauch staged a month-long performance in which he meditated on a white slab with a pillow at the Ceysson & Bénétière Gallery in New York for the entire duration of the project. The performance was livestreamed 24 hours a day on YouTube and was supposedly about mortality, sacrifice and challenging bodily limits. The livestream was actually only 2 hours’ worth of filming that was played continuously on a loop, giving the impression that Himebauch was meditating at the gallery when he was not. The ultimate purpose of this performance was to encourage viewers to question their expectations of art, and confront the realities that media can be an artifice. Himebauch also exhibited collages and large-scale paintings of landscapes, painted with window frames to simulate the experience of looking out of a window.

=== Here Comes the Twister, 2024 ===
Held at Gana Art Nineone in Korea, this exhibition was a reaction to feedback Himebauch had received from critics to "just paint". The show consisted of paintings that collectively chronicle the evolution of a tornado; however, the opening reception was also a performance piece. Viewers entered the gallery expecting to see art, and were met with empty walls, until Himebauch entered the space and stappled loose-canvas paintings directly onto the walls himself. After all of the paintings were stapled to the walls and unfurled from their tubes, Himebauch danced to the song "Fantastic Man” by William Onyeabor.

=== AI Critic, 2024 ===
Himebauch posted a video of art critic Jerry Saltz seemingly praising an exhibition of Himebauch's work Miami. The video was actually a deep fake that Himebauch made using artificial intelligence (AI) tools. In an era full of disinformation and the manipulation of perception, Himebauch's project encourages viewers to be curious about authenticity and what to trust.

=== Serenity Now, 2025 ===
In 2025, Himebauch had a solo exhibition entitled Serenity Now at Jupiter Miami where he showed a series of monochromatic landscapes inspired by pre-urban Miami. This series focused on restrained reflection and painting alone rather than on provocative performance.

=== Additional Exhibitions ===
In 2022, Trotter&Sholer gallery in New York mounted a solo exhibition of Himebauch's work, entitled Retrospective. The following year, Himebauch's work was included in a group exhibition entitled Vapor and Light at the Shin Gallery in Seoul, Korea.

=== Entrepreneurship ===
Himebauch is a founding partner of the bar, Forgtmenot, and founding partner of the Greek restaurant Kiki's, both in Lower Manhattan.
