= Michael Kirby (artist) =

Michael Kirby is a street artist who was born in Baltimore, Maryland, United States. His work has been featured and exhibited across the world for governments, cities, museums, and corporations.

== Biography ==
Michael Kirby was born in 1975 in Baltimore, Maryland. After completing school, he moved to Italy as a teenager where he became a part of the street art world and began creating street paintings in Florence and Rome. He would develop numerous styles that would influence artists around the world including 3D Art and Anamorphic Art. Kirby would use sharp angles and adjust his images to the viewer's point of view. In 2005 he returned to the place of his birth and founded his studio, Murals of Baltimore.

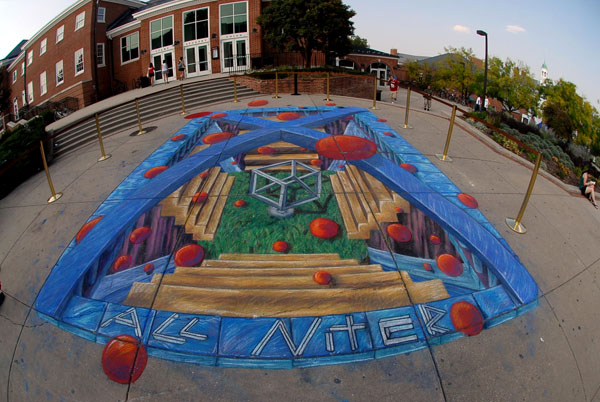
Surreal

As a street artist, Kirby has won various competitions and been featured in numerous festivals and galleries across the world. The LA Times wrote that "Michael Kirby is one of the best street painters in the world.""Bird Art Festival". Mr. Kirby was the first street painter to break away from the traditional methods and themes of the Renaissance. He created original art on the streets based on contemporary designs and themes that allowed him to take the art form across Europe, and North and South America. He has worked in over 200 cities including Rome, Paris, London, Berlin, New York, Mexico City, Guadalajara, San Francisco, Caracas, and Cartagena.

Michael Kirby has completed the largest murals in the state of Maryland and Virginia.

=== Projects ===
In 2007 Michael Kirby created an 8 x 45 meter mural of the Life of Pocahontas outside the home of Pocahontas, Werowocomoco, in Gloucester, Virginia for the 400 Anniversary Celebration.

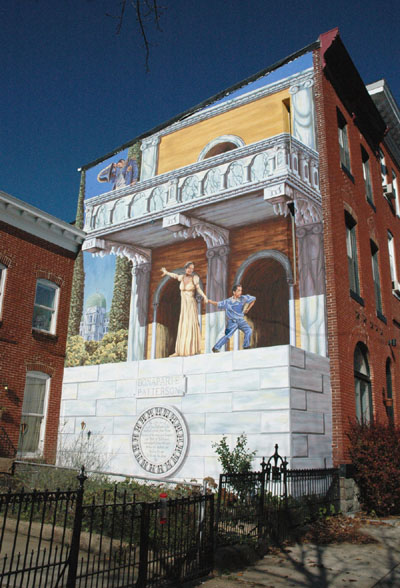
Mural by Michael Kirby

Kirby has been contracted by McDonald's Corp., The Black Eyed Peas, Earthlink, Honda Civic Tour, Johns Hopkins University, and other corporations for three-dimensional street paintings. He has also created murals for CSX Transportation, City of Baltimore, City of Guadalajara, Chiesa San Paolo in Napoli, Italy, Smithsonian Institution, and others. As well as giving lectures in Johns Hopkins University, North Carolina Museum of Art, and others.

== Media ==
Kirby's work has been featured in news outlets and media. He was featured on the Late Show with David Letterman and his work has been on Culpo Di Fulmine Show in Italy and German Public Television documentary on Cologne. His work has been featured on various television outlets such as ABC, Fox, and NBC.

Various newspapers and magazines have also written articles about his work such as LA Times, Baltimore Sun, Mural Guadalajara, Il Tempo Roma, Venezia Gazzetta and Il Publico.
