= Geco (artist) =

Italian street artist

- Occupation: Street artist
- Known for: Prolific and large graffiti

Geco is an Italian graffiti writer.

While Geco is best known for tagging buildings and structures in Rome, he has also done graffiti in Greece, Spain, and Portugal. Geco has been called "Italy's Banksy".

Geco primarily paints large block-letter pieces with a paint roller but also use stickers.

In 2020, they controversially painted a piece on the Aurelian Walls, which were built between 271 AD and 275 AD.

In November 2020, a man was arrested on suspicion of being Geco.
