= La Mano/Nami =

La Mano in Barcelona

La Mano (Spanish for The Hand; also: La Mano/Nami) is a graffiti artist based in Barcelona, who often paints a large hand. Unlike almost every noun ending in "o" in Spanish, it is feminine.
