= Maria Gabriela Brito =

Venezuelan author (born 1976)

María Gabriela Brito
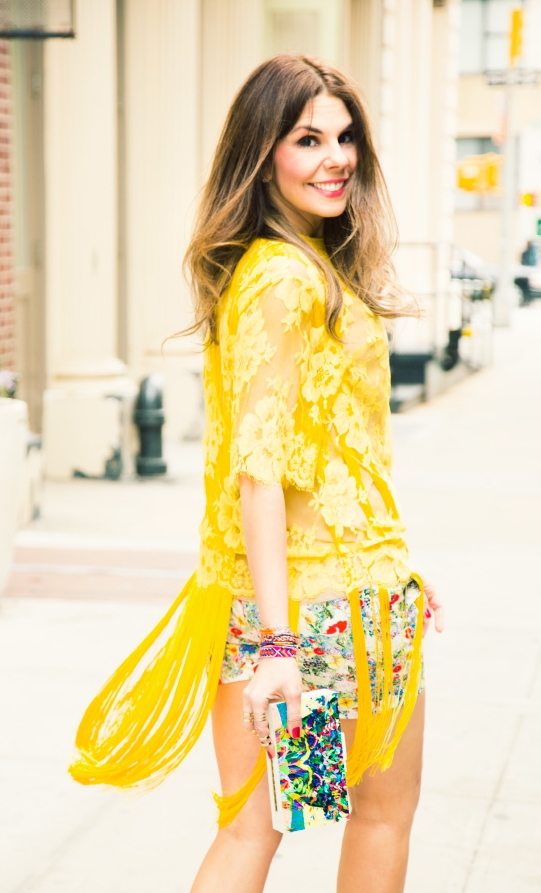
- Born: January 24, 1976 (age 50); Caracas, Venezuela
- Education: Harvard Law School
- Occupations: Art advisor, curator, author
- Notable work: Greek Gotham; Out There: Design, Art, Travel Shopping; The "C" Files

María Gabriela Brito (born 1976) is a Venezuelan-born curator, art advisor, and author based in New York City. Her published works include How Creativity Rules The World published by HarperCollins in 2022, Out There: Design, Art, Travel Shopping, published by Pointed Leaf Press in 2013, and Greek Gotham, published in 2016.

== Early life ==
Brito was born and raised in Caracas, Venezuela. She graduated from Católica University in Caracas and then from Harvard Law School in 2000.

== Career ==
After law school, Maria moved to New York City to pursue a career as a corporate attorney. She started collecting contemporary art in the same year while working at the law firm of Cahill Gordon & Reindel. After nine years practicing law and acquiring art, Brito opened her own interior design and art advisory company, then called Lifestyling by Maria Brito (now María Brito, LLC).

Brito has worked as an art consultant and interior designer for Sean "Diddy" Combs, Gwyneth Paltrow and Tracy Anderson, among others.

In 2014, Brito launched her first collection of luxury fashion accessories in collaboration with contemporary artists Kenny Scharf, Erik Parker and Carlos Rolon/Dzine, and the collaborations have expanded to include more than 50 different products designed by Brito with a variety of artists including Katherine Bernhardt, Nir Hod and assume vivid astro focus. Brito is also a writer and public speaker about the interdisciplinary approach of integrating art and design.

=== Greek Gotham ===
In the summer of 2016, Brito curated her first contemporary art show, titled Greek Gotham, in Mykonos, Greece. Consisting solely of New York-based artists, the exhibition featured works from assume vivid astro focus, Nina Chanel Abney, Greg Bogin, Mira Dancy, Raul De Nieves, Michael Dotson, Sebastian Errazuriz, Nir Hod, Todd James, Misaki Kawai, KAWS, Robert Lazzarini, Austin Lee, Taylor McKimens, Matthew Palladino and Erik Parker.

== Publications ==
In 2013, Brito’s monograph Out There: Design, Art, Travel, Shopping was released. The book outlines her personal experiences transitioning from law into a creative entrepreneur, her initial art and design projects as well as an insider's guide to art and design. Published by Pointed Leaf Press, it was the recipient of the USA Best Book Awards in both the Art and Design Categories, and received reviews from TIME, DuJour Magazine, and Vogue Mexico.

Greek Gotham, an art catalogue published by Dio Horia in conjunction with the exhibition, was released in 2016. It features an introduction by Jeffrey Deitch.

Brito is also the author of the best seller How Creativity Rules The World: The Art and Business of Turning Your Ideas Into Gold (HarperCollins Leadership March 2022), which won the Axiom Book Award and the International Book Award both on the entrepreneurship category and was selected by Next Big Idea Club as one of the best creativity and business books of the year.

== TV Series ==
In 2019, she created and hosted "The "C" Files with Maria Brito", a TV and streaming series for the public media platform "ALL ARTS". Guests included contemporary artists Sanford Biggers, Swoon, Juliana Huxtable, Hank Willis Thomas and the art collective For Freedoms.
