= Charney Companies =

American real estate company

Charney Companies is an American fully-integrated real estate development, brokerage and management firm with headquarters in Long Island City, New York. Founded in 2013 by Sam Charney, the company has developed and operates over two million square feet of mixed-use, mixed income residential, and retail properties throughout the New York metropolitan area.

== History ==
Sam Charney founded the firm in 2013. In 2015, Charney Co. developed its first project, The Jackson Condominium, on 47th Avenue in Long Island City.

In March 2016, Charney Companies purchased the site of the Dime Savings Bank of Williamsburg, Brooklyn for $80 million. The firm later announced that it planned to fully restore the 112-year-old neoclassical bank and construct a 23-story tall residential, office and retail tower behind the building. The project was completed, and leasing began in 2020. The Dime is also home to the largest publicly accessible EV charging hub in New York, run by Revel.

The Green House, a 12-story residential building located in Long Island City, Queens, completed construction in January 2023. Designed by Studio V Architecture and financed by Santander Bank, Green House features three art murals by FAILE as well as an interactive light installation by Jen Lewin.

In 2024, Charney Companies acquired a former dormitory at 99 Claremont Avenue in Morningside Heights for $38 million and redeveloped it into student housing; the firm resold the completed property to Columbia University in July 2026 for $122 million.

In April 2025, Charney Co. secured $145 million in acquisition and predevelopment financing for 175 Third Street in Gowanus, Brooklyn, backed by Silver Point Capital, The Brodsky Organization, and Tikehau Capital. Designed by Bjarke Ingels Group, the mixed-use development will include 1,000 residential units and public space along the Gowanus Canal, and is set to become one of the largest residential buildings in Brooklyn.

In May 2025, Charney Co. secured $135 million in construction financing for its 45‑story condominium tower at 95 Rockwell Place in Fort Greene, Brooklyn, with financing led by BH3 Management and Madison Realty Capital. The project will deliver 182 units.

Charney Companies secured $525 million in construction financing for a 55-story condominium tower at 24-19 Jackson Avenue in Long Island City in June 2025. The project will include 600 units and retail space featuring Chelsea Piers Fitness.

In October 2025, Charney Companies acquired an eight-family building at 83 Second Place in Carroll Gardens, Brooklyn, for US $4.2 million. The deal, completed within a week, expanded the firm’s New York City multi-family portfolio.

In June 2026, The Real Deal ranked Charney Companies as the second most active developer in New York City in its annual rankings, citing more than 1.4 million square feet of active projects driven by three major Gowanus developments.

Charney Companies closed on $785 million in construction financing for 175 Third Street in Gowanus, Brooklyn in June 2026, marking the fifth and largest building in the Gowanus Wharf masterplan. Apollo and Affinius Capital provided $600 million in debt financing, while RXR contributed $185 million in equity.

The firm acquired 143 Roebling Street, a five-story, 49-unit loft and rental building in Williamsburg, Brooklyn, from Calmwater Capital for $20 million in June 2026. BH3 Fund Advisors provided $30 million in financing for the acquisition, predevelopment, and planning of the property originally built in 1907.

== Properties ==
Charney Companies has developed and operates over two million square feet of mixed-use, mixed-income residential and retail properties throughout the New York metropolitan area. Its portfolio includes:

- The Jackson, 11-51 47th Avenue, Long Island City: an eleven-story condominium developed and managed by Charney Companies.
- The Dime, 275 South 5th Street, Brooklyn: A mixed-use residential, office and retail tower in Williamsburg, developed by Charney Companies alongside the restored, landmarked Dime Savings Bank building.
- The Green House, 10-25 Jackson Avenue, Long Island City: A twelve-story residential building developed and managed by Charney Companies.
- Union Channel, 240 3rd Avenue, Brooklyn: A nine-story residential building in Gowanus designed by Fogarty Finger Architects, developed by Charney Companies and managed by the firm; it is the first completed building in the Gowanus Wharf campus.
- Douglass Port, 251 Douglass Street, Brooklyn: A fifteen-story residential building in Gowanus designed by Fogarty Finger Architects, developed by Charney Companies and managed by the firm; it is the second completed building in the Gowanus Wharf campus.
- Nevins Landing South, 340 Nevins Street, Brooklyn: A twenty-two-story residential building in Gowanus designed by Fogarty Finger Architects, developed by Charney Companies and managed by the firm; it is the third completed building in the Gowanus Wharf campus.
- 99 Claremont Avenue, Morningside Heights, Manhattan: A former dormitory redeveloped by Charney Companies into student housing and sold to Columbia University in 2026.
- 83 Second Place, Carroll Gardens, Brooklyn: An eight-family home acquired and managed by Charney Companies.
- 202 South 2nd Street, Brooklyn: A residential building in Williamsburg managed by Charney Companies.
- 14 Lincoln Place, Brooklyn: An eight-unit residential building in Park Slope managed by Charney Companies.

=== In development ===
- Nevins Landing North, 310 Nevins Street, Brooklyn: A 348-unit rental building designed by Fogarty Finger Architects along the Gowanus Canal, part of the Gowanus Wharf campus.
- 175 Third Street, Brooklyn: A roughly 1.1-million-square-foot mixed-use tower designed by Bjarke Ingels Group, with more than 1,000 rental units and public access space along the Gowanus Canal designed by James Corner Field Operations. It is part of the Gowanus Wharf campus.
- 95 Rockwell Place, Brooklyn: A 182-unit condominium designed by Fogarty Finger Architects in Brooklyn's BAM Cultural District, near Atlantic Terminal and Barclays Center.
- Court Square, 45-03 23rd Street, Long Island City: A 53-story residential and commercial tower adjacent to the Court Square subway station.
- 143 Roebling Street, Williamsburg, Brooklyn: A five-story, 49-unit loft and rental building acquired by Charney Companies in 2026 for restoration; the 1907 building had been vacant for several years.

== Public art ==
Public art is a recurring feature of Charney Companies' developments.

At The Dime in Williamsburg, the firm commissioned Brooklyn-based artist Swoon to paint a 35-by-12-foot mural on the tower's facade, five stories above street level, near the landmarked Dime Savings Bank building; the mural depicts a black-and-white nature scene without human figures. Swoon also created a second piece for the building's residential lobby, while the adjoining commercial lobby features a laser-cut, found-material collage by artist Tom Fruin.

At The Green House, a residential building in Long Island City, the Brooklyn-based street-art duo FAILE was commissioned to create three large-scale murals on the building's facade. The lobby features an interactive light installation, Flux Chandelier, by artist Jen Lewin.

In Gowanus, Brooklyn, the company partnered with the nonprofit Arts Gowanus on the city's Art Bridge/City Canvas program, commissioning local artists to paint murals on construction fencing at its Gowanus Wharf sites, including 300 Nevins Street and 585 Union Street.

585 Union Street, now known as Union Channel, is also one of the sites for Friends from the Canal, a multi-site public art installation by artist duo Mookntaka produced by the Van Alen Institute.

In August 2026, Jen Lewin's sculptures The Ursas were permanently installed at Nevins Landing, part of the Gowanus Wharf campus. The pair of works, titled Ursa Major and Ursa Minor, were first exhibited at Burning Man in 2023 and now anchor a new public stretch of the Gowanus Canal waterfront. The waterfront will also feature works including a tiny house by Tom Fruin, a smiley-face sculpture by Austin Lee, and one of Adam Parker Smith's eerie stone cupids.
