= Sam Charney =

American businessman

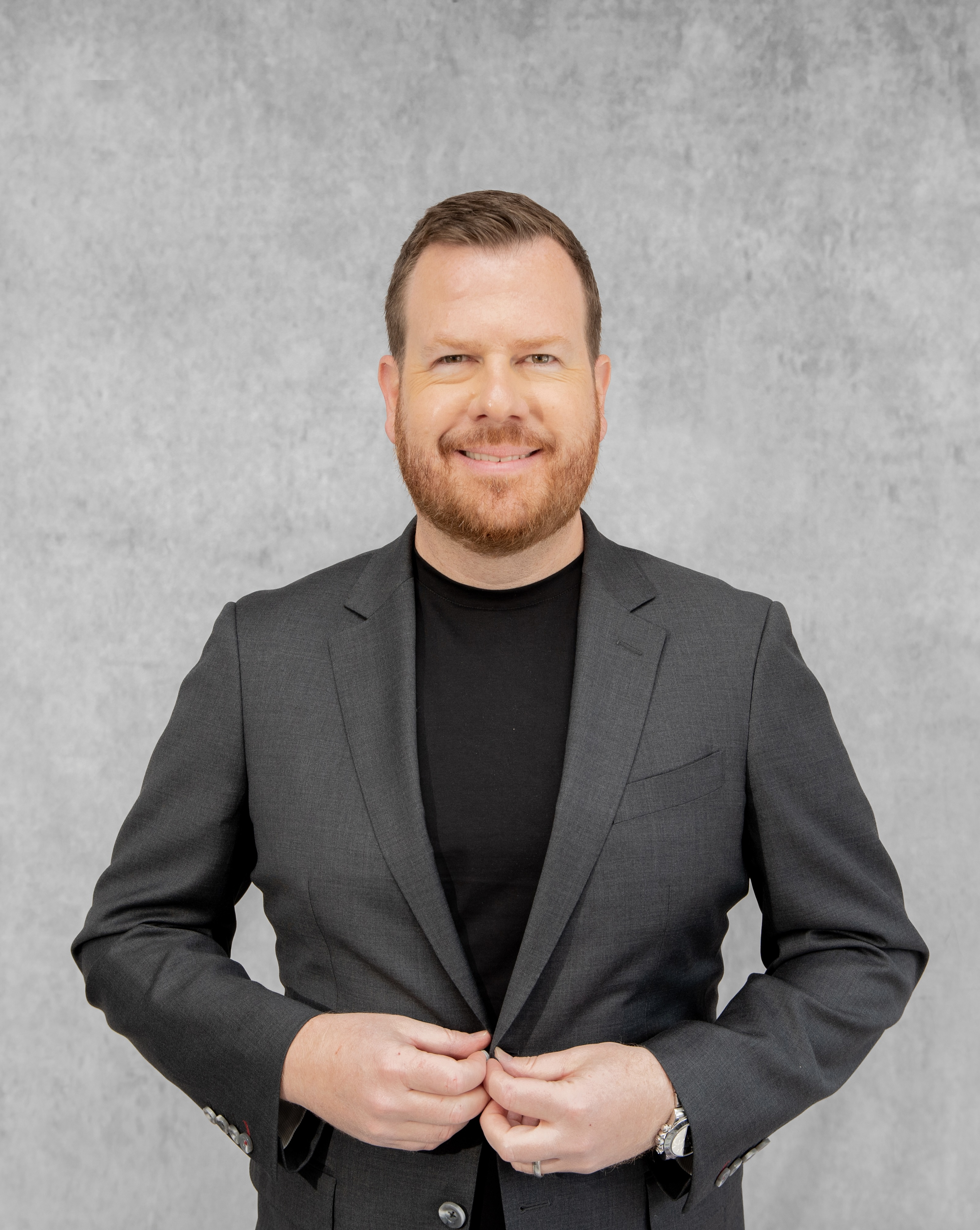
- Known for: Founder of Charney Companies

Sam Charney is an American real estate developer and the founder of Charney Companies, a real estate development firm based in Long Island City, New York.

== Early life and education ==
Charney grew up in Manhattan and attended the Dalton School. After graduating from Bates College, Charney enrolled in the Harvard Graduate School of Design. He received a Master's from New York University.

== Career ==
From 2004 to 2012, Charney worked as a project executive for Two Trees Management, developing over 1 million square feet of office space and housing. He also co-founded Two Tree's construction company GreenStar Builders. His work there earned him Brooklyn Building Awards for the West Elm Corporate Offices and the Waterfront Media Headquarters as well as for the adaptive-reuse rehabilitation of the 1859 warehouse at 164 Atlantic Avenue, his first development project.

He founded his own real estate firm, Charney Companies, in 2013. As his first solo project, he “took all the equity [he] had saved up and bought a piece of land in Long Island City.” This lot later became The Jackson Condominium, an 11-story development near MoMA PS1 that features a lobby mosaic wall designed by Tom Fruin.

In 2024, Charney's firm acquired 99 Claremont Avenue, a former Union Theological Seminary dormitory in Morningside Heights, Manhattan for $38 million, marking his first project in the borough, and converted it into student housing. In July 2026, his firm sold the redeveloped property to Columbia University for $122 million.

== Boards and Honors ==
Charney serves as vice chair of the board of trustees of the Queens Museum. He also sits on the boards of the Brooklyn Museum and Pursuit, a nonprofit focused on adult education and job training, and serves on the Construction Committee of the Brooklyn Public Library.

In 2012, he received New York University’s Bart Lawson Award for Humanitarianism for his work with blind athletes. He has been listed among The Real Deal's TRD 100, and was recognized on City & State's "Brooklyn Power 100" and "Queens Power 100" lists. He was also named to Crain's New York Business "Notable Leaders in Real Estate" list in 2022. In 2025, he was awarded Developer of the Year at the RED Residential Awards. In 2026, Forbes Romania named him "Developer of the Year".

== Personal life ==
Charney is married with 2 children, is a Democrat and has made donations to Eric Adams' mayoral re-election campaign.

=== Art collection ===
Charney's interest in art began in high school, working as an errand boy at a Soho gallery, and led him to major in art history in college with a focus on street art. His first purchase was a Shepard Fairey print, followed by early Banksy prints from the now-defunct gallery Pictures on Walls. His collection includes street art pioneers Keith Haring, Kaws, JR, Swoon, and BÄST, works by Marc Chagall, Louise Nevelson, and Alexander Calder, and pieces by African and underrepresented artists including Foster Sakyiamah, Jammie Holmes, and Shaina McCoy. Notable pieces include the original stencil Shepard Fairey used for Greetings From Iraq (2005), previously owned by Robin Williams, and Leap Year by Honor Titus.

Charney has made site-specific public art a recurring feature of his company's projects.
