= Dime Savings Bank of New York =

Bank in Brooklyn, New York (1859–2002)

Dime Bancorp, Inc.

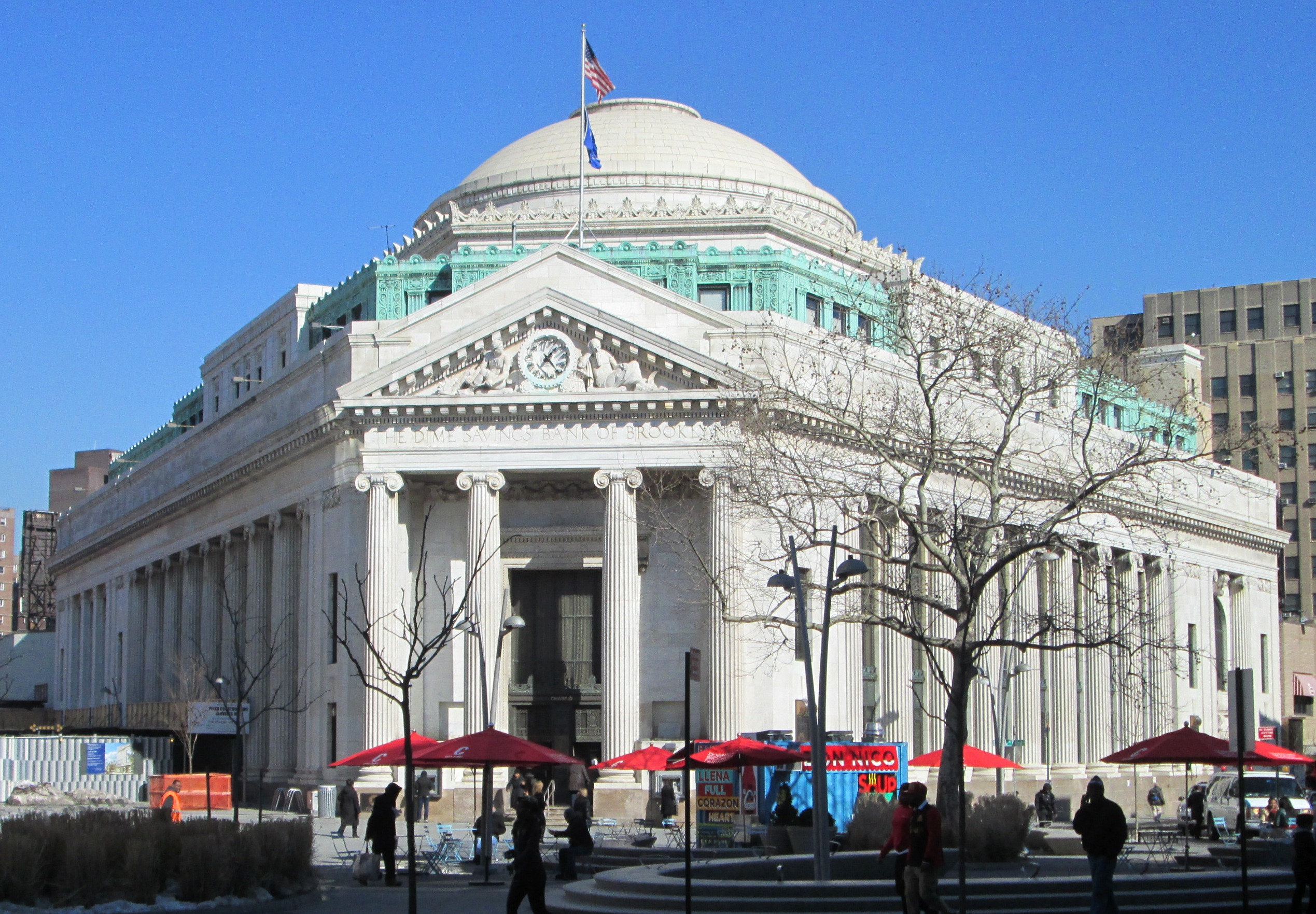
- The bank's original headquarters in Brooklyn at 9 DeKalb Avenue
- Trade name: Dime Savings Bank of New York
- Traded as: NYSE: DME
- Industry: Bank holding company
- Founded: 1859; 167 years ago
- Defunct: January 8, 2002; 24 years ago
- Fate: Acquired by Washington Mutual and rebranded all of its locations to Washington Mutual banks
- Successor: Washington Mutual, JPMorgan Chase
- Headquarters: Brooklyn
- Products: Financial services
- Website: archived official website

The Dime Savings Bank of New York, originally the Dime Savings Bank of Brooklyn, was an American bank headquartered in Brooklyn, New York City. It operated from 1859 to 2002.

The bank was formerly headquartered at 9 DeKalb Avenue, built in 1906–08 in Downtown Brooklyn. Dime was acquired by Washington Mutual in 2002, which subsequently failed in 2008 and was acquired by JPMorgan Chase, which currently owns all former Dime assets.

== History ==
The Dime Savings Bank of Brooklyn was chartered in 1859; its name referenced the fact that clients could originally create an account with as little as a dime. The bank's home office moved several times in the late 19th century as the city of Brooklyn grew. By the 1900s, Brooklyn was part of the City of Greater New York, and transportation and businesses were expanding into the area east of Brooklyn Borough Hall (including what is now Albee Square). A new home-office building for the Dime Savings Bank at DeKalb Avenue and Fleet Street was announced in September 1905. The Dime Savings Bank moved to its DeKalb Avenue building on December 19, 1908.

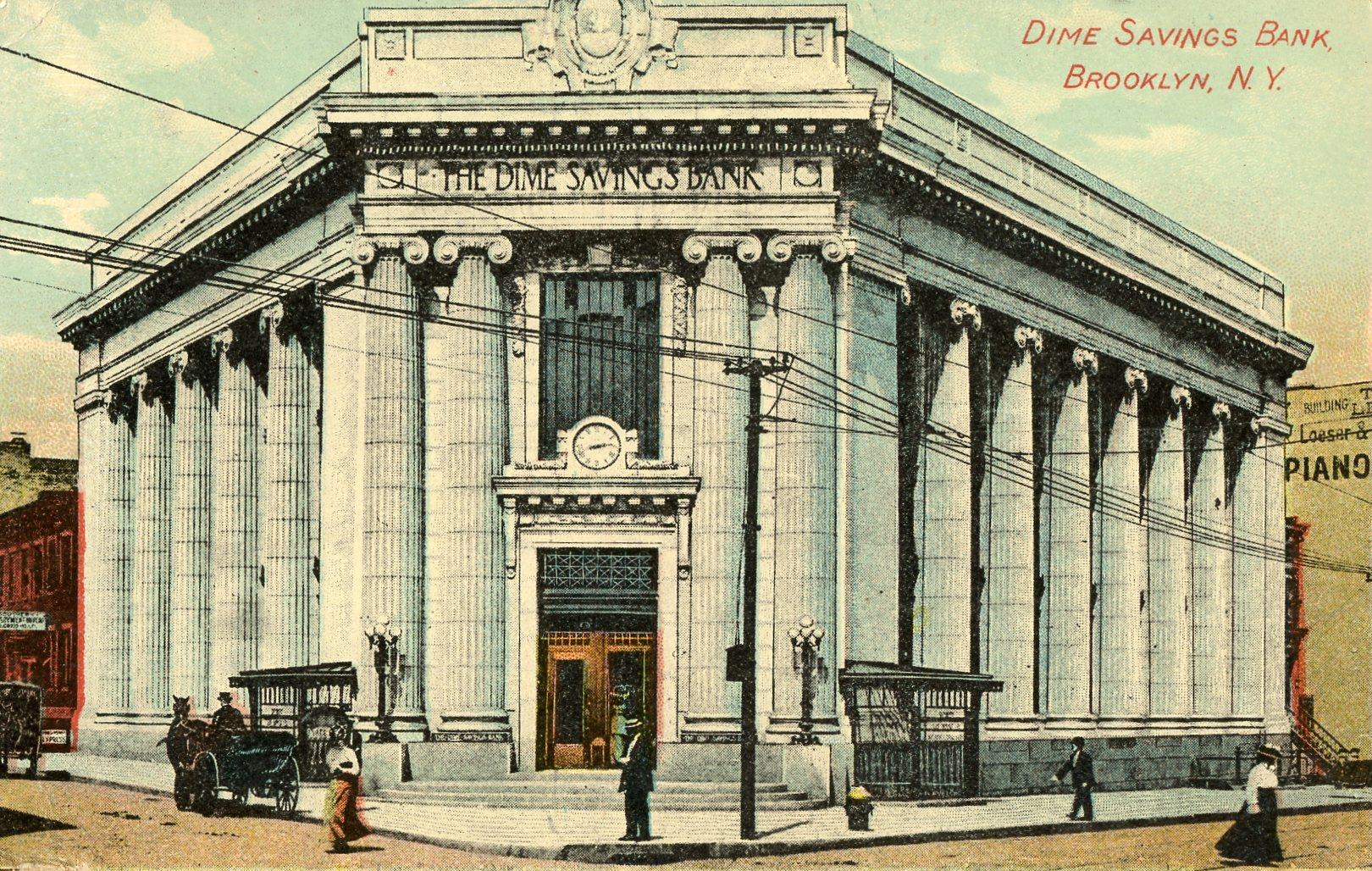
1912 postcard of 9 DeKalb Avenue

In July 1994, Dime Bancorp announced the pending acquisition of the Hewlett, New York-based Anchor Bancorp with its Anchor Savings Bank, FSB subsidiary for $1.2 billion in stock. The acquisition was completed in January 1995. The merger resulted in a newly combined company with 76 branches in New York, 18 in New Jersey and 5 in Florida.

In September 1999, Hudson United Bancorp and Dime Bancorp announced a merger of equals that was worth $2 billion in stock. But before the merger could be implemented, North Fork Bancorporation initiated a hostile takeover attempt of Dime in March 2000. Since Dime was preoccupied with defending itself against North Fork, Dime and Hudson United decided to terminate their merger agreement in April. North Fork finally gave up in September 2000 after spending several months filling lawsuits against Dime and defending itself against counter lawsuits that were filed by Dime. (Hudson United would eventually be acquired by TD Banknorth in 2005, while North Fork would be acquired by Capital One shortly thereafter.)

In June 2001, Washington Mutual announced the pending acquisition of Dime Bancorp for $5.2 billion in cash and stock. The acquisition was completed in January 2002. At the time of its acquisition, Dime had 123 branch offices in the New York City area in the states of New York and New Jersey. Washington Mutual subsequently failed in 2008. Dime was included in the assets that were sold to JPMorgan Chase by the Federal Deposit Insurance Corporation after Washington Mutual was seized and placed in receivership.

In 2016, Charney Companies purchased the bank's original site for $80 million. Charney Co. later announced in 2018 that the firm, along with Tavros Capital Partners, would restore the bank's original neoclassical architecture as well as construct a 22-story residential tower adjacent to the bank. The project was completed in 2020. The Dime is also home to the largest publicly accessible EV charging hub in New York, run by Revel.

== Headquarters ==
The bank's headquarters at 9 DeKalb Avenue were built in 1906–08 and were designed by Mowbray and Uffinger. It was significantly enlarged by Halsey, McCormack and Helmer in 1931–32. The headquarters is a New York City designated landmark. In December 2015, developers Michael Stern and Joe Chetrit closed on a $90 million purchase of the Dime Savings Bank headquarters. They planned to incorporate the structure into The Brooklyn Tower (then-known as 9 Dekalb Avenue). Construction of the tower's superstructure began in 2018, and was completed in 2022, becoming the tallest building in Brooklyn and the tallest building in New York City outside of Manhattan.
