= Allison Janae Hamilton =

American visual artist

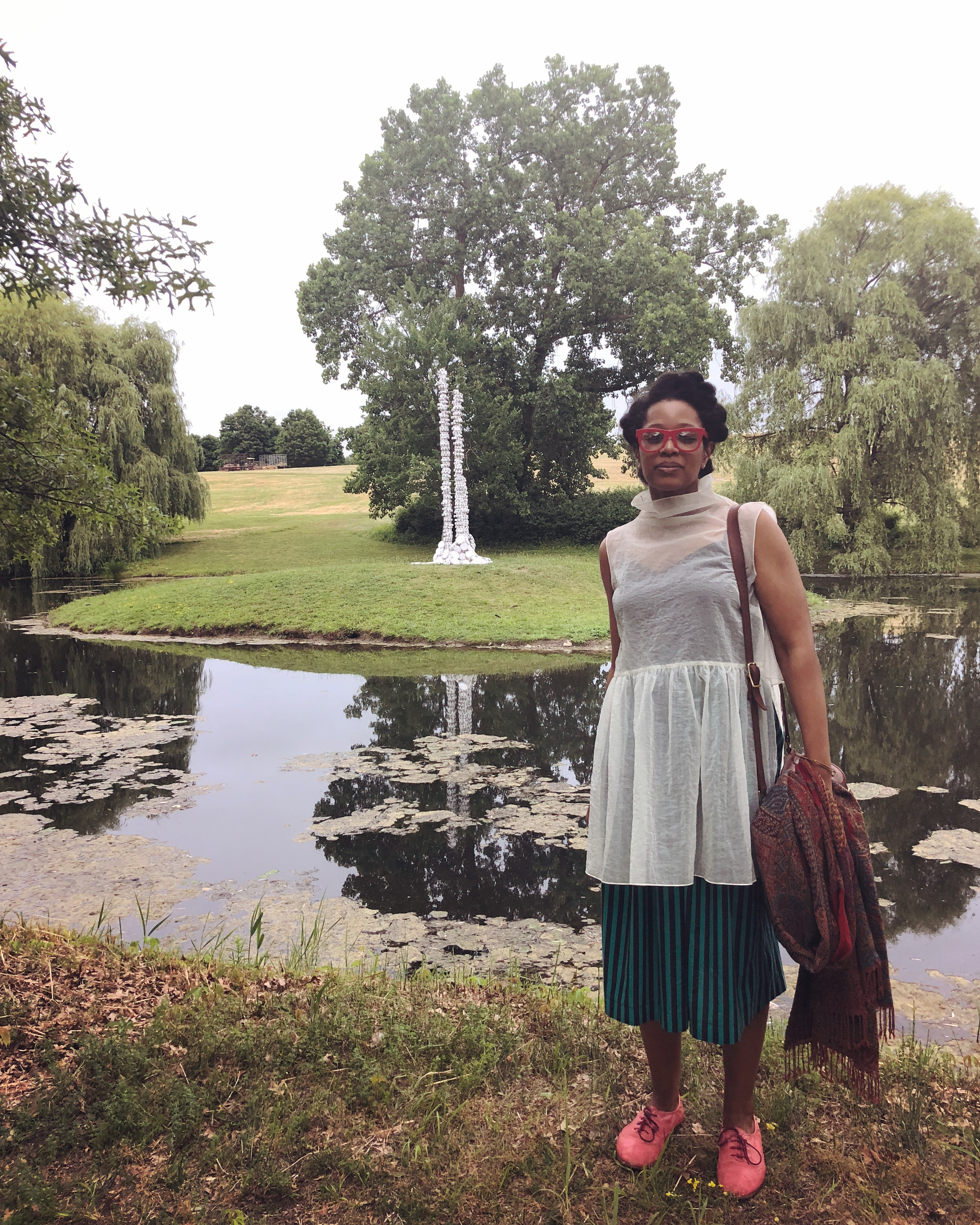
- Hamilton in front of her installation, "The peo-ple cried mer-cy in the storm," at Storm King Art Center in 2018
- Born: 1984 (age 41–42); Lexington, Kentucky
- Education: Columbia University, New York University, Florida State University
- Website: allisonjanaehamilton.com

Allison Janae Hamilton (born 1984) is a film director and American artist.

== Early life and education ==
Hamilton was raised in Florida and received her MFA in visual arts from Columbia University, PhD in American studies from New York University, MA in African-American studies from Columbia University and two BS degrees from Florida State University.

== Work ==
Hamilton's relationship with the locations of her upbringing and family roots forms the cornerstone of her artwork, as particularly seen in her engagement with the landscapes of Northern Florida and Western Tennessee. Using layered imagery and complex sounds from the natural world, Hamilton creates immersive artworks and films that often consider the ways that the American landscape contributes to our ideas of "Americana"; and social relationships to space in the face of a changing climate, particularly within the rural American south.

Hamilton is widely known both for her film work and work as an artist. Hamilton refers to landscape as the "central protagonist" in her work, rather than a backdrop, and through the blending of land-centered folklore and personal family narratives, she engages haunting yet epic mythologies that address the social and political concerns of today's changing terrain.

Hamilton has presented solo exhibitions at Massachusetts Museum of Contemporary Art and the Joslyn Art Museum, and has also exhibited her work at Storm King Art Center, the Museum of Modern Art, the Studio Museum in Harlem, the Smithsonian National Portrait Gallery and others. Her films and immersive installations have been presented at major museums and film festivals, including the BlackStar Film Festival. Hamilton is the winner of the VIA Art Fund Production Grant supporting her narrative short, Venus of Ossabaw, and premiering at the Telfair Museums in March 2027. In 2021, Hamilton presented an immersive film artwork, Wacissa, on 73 screens in Times Square in New York City. The film was later acquired by the Smithsonian American Art Museum. Hamilton is a recipient of the Creative Capital Award and a Rema Hort Mann Foundation grant. She was a 2013-2014 fellow at the Whitney Independent Study Program, sponsored by the Whitney Museum of American Art. She has been awarded artist residencies at the Studio Museum in Harlem (New York), Recess (New York) and Fundación Botín (Santander, Spain). Work by the artist is held in public collections including the Smithsonian American Art Museum, Menil Collection, Nasher Museum of Art, Nevada Museum of Art, the Hood Museum of Art and the Speed Art Museum.

Hamilton was accepted into the Sundance Institute's Feature Film Program Development Track for her screenplay, Floridaland, as part of the 2026 Sundance Screenwriters Intensive Fellowship.

Hamilton is represented by Marianne Boesky Gallery.

== Selected filmography ==
- Floridaland (TBC) - Director and writer. Script currently in production.
- Venus of Ossabaw (2026) - Director and writer. Narrative short.
- Celestine (Florida Storm) (2025) - Director. Experimental short.
- A House Called Florida (2022) - Director and writer. Experimental short, three-channel looped installation.
- Wacissa (2019) - Director. Experimental short.

== Selected solo exhibitions ==
- 2025 Allison Janae Hamilton: Soil and Stars at SOCO Gallery, Charlotte, North Carolina
- 2025 Allison Janae Hamilton: Celestine at Marianne Boesky Gallery, New York
- 2022 Allison Janae Hamilton: Between Life and Landscape at Georgia Museum of Art, Athens, Georgia
- 2022 Allison Janae Hamilton: Recent Works at Joslyn Art Museum, Omaha, Nebraska
- 2021 A Romance of Paradise at Marianne Boesky Gallery, New York
- 2021 Wacissa at Times Square Arts, New York
- 2020 Waters of a Lower Register at Brooklyn Bridge Park via Creative Time, New York
- 2018 Allison Janae Hamilton: Pitch at Massachusetts Museum of Contemporary Art, North Adams, Massachusetts
- 2018 Passage at Atlanta Contemporary, Atlanta, Georgia
- 2017 Allison Janae Hamilton: Wonder Room at Recess, New York

== Selected collections ==
- The Menil Collection, Houston, Texas
- The Studio Museum in Harlem, New York
- Smithsonian American Art Museum, Washington, DC
- Speed Art Museum, Louisville, Kentucky
- Syracuse University Art Museum, Syracuse, New York
- Ogden Museum of Southern Art, New Orleans, Louisiana
- Hessel Museum of Art, Bard College, Annandale-on-Hudson, New York
- Hood Museum of Art, Dartmouth College, Hanover, New Hampshire
- Norton Museum of Art, West Palm Beach, Florida
- Nasher Museum of Art, Durham, North Carolina
- International African American Museum, Charleston, South Carolina
- Nevada Museum of Art, Reno, Nevada
- Williams College Museum of Art, Williamstown, Massachusetts
