= The Haas Brothers (artists) =

American artists

The Haas Brothers (twins, Nikolai and Simon Haas, b.1984) are American artists, noted for their sculptural works that blur the line between art and design. They currently work in Los Angeles, California.

== Biography ==
Nikolai and Simon Haas were born in Santa Monica, California but grew up in Austin, Texas. Their mother, Emily Tracy, was an opera singer and their father, Berthold Haas, was a sculptor. Their older brother Lukas Haas is an actor. Simon Haas studied at the Rhode Island School of Design, while Nikolai focused on music with his band, RRIICCEE, in Los Angeles.

Their first collaborative project together was in 2009 when they created bespoke furniture for Tobey Maguire. This project led to other commissions for high-profile clients including Lady Gaga, Donatella Versace, and Peter Marino, which allowed them to formally open their studio in Los Angeles in 2010.

In 2013-14, they decided to relocate from New York to Los Angeles. They described the old studio as being too crowded and wanting to have more space for their projects.

As their practice developed, they moved from thinking about functionality first to “start[ing] with emotional content,” as Simon has stated. Their practice has expanded to include both small and large-scale sculpture in a wide variety of materials.

== Professional work ==
The Haas Brothers had a solo show at the Bass Museum of Art in Miami, Florida (December 2018-April 2019). In 2026, the Museum of Arts and Design in New York presented Uncanny Valley (11 April – 16 August 2026), a mid-career survey of some eighty-five works organised by Cranbrook Art Museum and curated by Laura Mott, which then travelled on a national tour.

They have also been included in group exhibitions at the Boca Raton Museum of Art, the ArtScience Museum in Singapore, and the Cooper Hewitt, Smithsonian Design Museum.

The Haas Brothers’ works are included in major collections including the Cooper Hewitt, Smithsonian Design Museum, New York, NY; Los Angeles County Museum of Art, Los Angeles, CA; Rhode Island School of Design Museum, Providence, RI; and The Metropolitan Museum of Art, New York, NY.

They are represented by R & Company and Marianne Boesky Gallery, both in New York, and by Lora Reynolds in Austin, TX.

=== Collaborations ===
In 2019, the Haas Brothers launched a luxury home goods collection in collaboration with L’OBJET. The line is also sold through Bergdorf Goodman. In 2013, The Haas Brothers began to collaborate with Monkeybiz, a South African women’s collective known for their beadwork. Monkeybiz, who also have branded themselves The Haas Sisters, have worked with the Haas Brothers on their Afreaks sculptures, which were included in the Cooper Hewitt Design Triennial. The Haas Brothers have also established a partnership with a group of women from Lost Hills, California, a small agricultural town with limited employment opportunities for women. They have facilitated the opportunity for the women to learn beadwork skills and now employ them for their beadwork creations.

== Bibliography ==
- R & Company: 20 Years of Discovery. Bologna, Italy and New York, NY: Damiani and R & Company, 2018. ISBN 8862085818
- Haas, Simon, Chee Pearlman and Emily Tracy-Haas. Haas Brothers Volume II: Afreaks. Bologna, Italy and New York, NY: Damiani and R & Company, 2015. ISBN 978-8862084345
- Haas Brothers: Feinstein. Zurich, Switzerland: Galerie Gmurzynska, 2014.
- Haas Brothers: Volume One. Bologna, Italy and New York, NY: Damiani and R & Company, 2014. ISBN 978-8862083737
