= Barnaby Furnas =

British American painter

Barnaby Furnas (born Philadelphia, Pennsylvania, 1973) is a British painter and former graffiti artist who lives and works in New York City. He studied at the School of Visual Arts in New York and received a BFA in 1995 before going on to study at Columbia University in New York, receiving an MFA in 2000. He makes his own paint from pigment mixed with urethane.

== Exhibitions ==
Furnas’s work has been exhibited widely internationally at galleries and museums such as the Baltic Centre for Contemporary Art in Gateshead in the UK, Kunsthalle Wien in Austria, Museum of Contemporary Art, Chicago, Museo d'Arte Moderna di Bologna, The Whitney Museum of American Art in New York, and The Royal Academy in London. He is represented by Marianne Boesky Gallery in New York and Victoria Miro Gallery in London. His work is included in the collection of the Pérez Art Museum Miami, Florida.
