= Niu Technologies =

Chinese electric scooter company

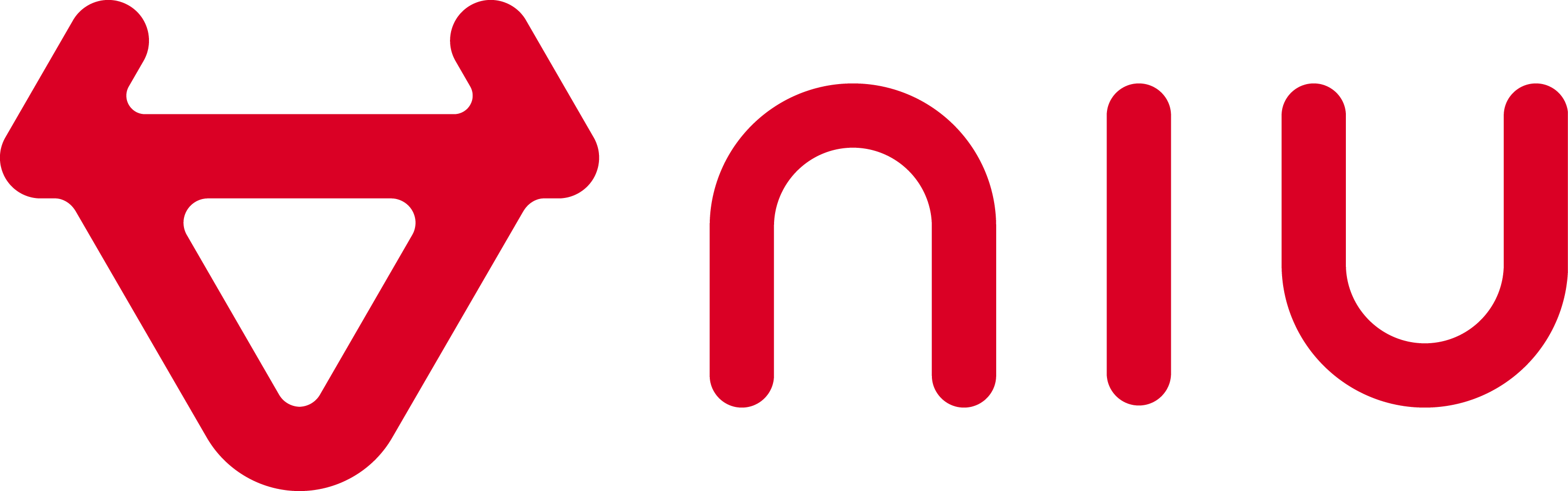

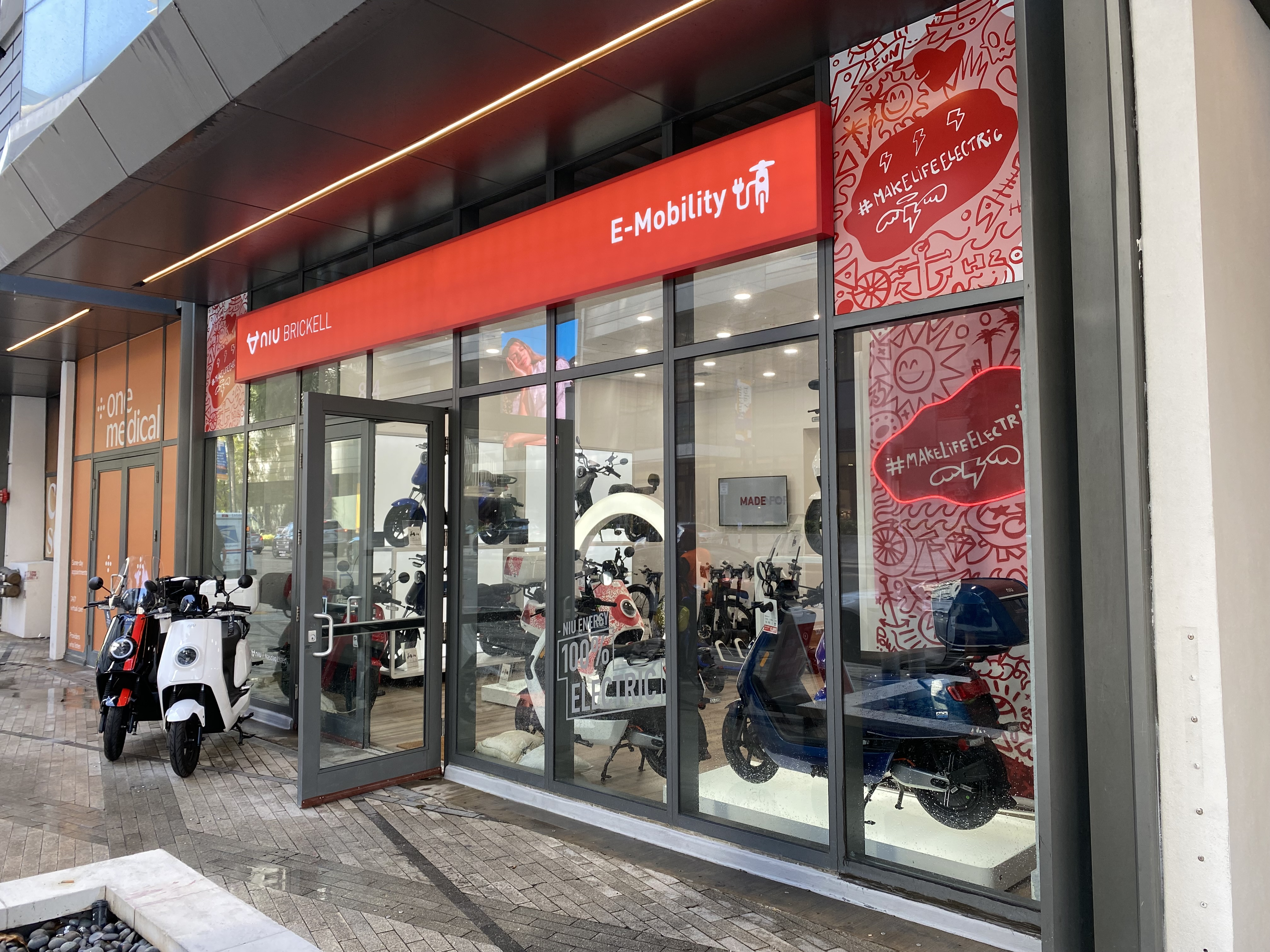
- International showroom in Miami, Florida
- Type: Public
- Traded as: Nasdaq: NIU
- ISIN: US65481N1000
- Industry: Vehicle manufacturing, eMobility
- Founded: 2014; 12 years ago
- Founder: Li Yi'nan, Token Yilin Hu
- Headquarters: Beijing, China
- Key people: Yan Li
- Revenue: ▼US$459 million (2022); US$581 million (2021)
- Net income: ▼-US$7 million (2022); US$35 million (2021)
- Number of employees: 500-800
- Website: www.niu.com

Niu Technologies (Chinese: 牛电科技; stylized as NIU) is an electric mobility company headquartered in Beijing, China. Yan Li has been its CEO and COO since December 2017.

NIU is a publicly traded Chinese company that designs, manufactures and sells smart electric two-wheeled vehicles including scooters, mopeds, electric bicycles, kick-scooters, electric motorcycles and ATVs. Niu vehicles include digital displays, Bluetooth connectivity, and mobile apps that let users track their rides, map their routes and monitor battery life.

As of December 31, 2025, NIU had 4,540 franchised stores in China. By June 30, 2026 this had grown to 4,570, with lower-tier cities making up about 36% of the footprint. NIU's Q2 call also reported 417 active overseas dealer locations, up from 307. For its micro-mobility products, NIU developed offline retail channels through partners such as Best Buy in the United States and MediaMarkt in Europe, giving it a presence in over 1,000 physical locations in those regions by the end of 2024.

== History ==
The company was founded in 2014 by Baidu's former chief technology officer, Li Yinan, and Token Yilin Hu. The first Niu scooters were crowdfunded. It differentiated itself by using lithium-ion batteries as opposed to the cheaper lead-acid alternatives widely used in Chinese e-scooters at the time.

In 2018, NIU listed on the NASDAQ stock exchange under the ticker symbol NIU.

In 2019, Revel Transit launched in New York City with 1,000 Niu electric scooters, later expanding to Washington DC, Austin and Miami. In 2021, the company broadened its portfolio to include electric bikes.

In 2023, NIU announced the XQi3, its first electric dirt bike, offered in both street-legal and off-road versions. The same year it also introduced the KQi3 Max and the KQi Air Series.

NIU turned its focus back to mopeds in 2024, previewing the NQiX Series, a redesign of its NQi-Series. At EICMA 2025 in Milan, the company announced 2026 updates to the range, including onboard Google Maps navigation, and premiered the FQiX Series, a new urban moped platform in 150 and 300 variants, which reached European dealers in July 2026.

On 2 September 2026, NIU announced a partnership with gaming-hardware company Razer, with a co-branded FQiX Special Edition as its first product. Pre-orders opened in Europe the same day, with first deliveries scheduled for the first quarter of 2027.

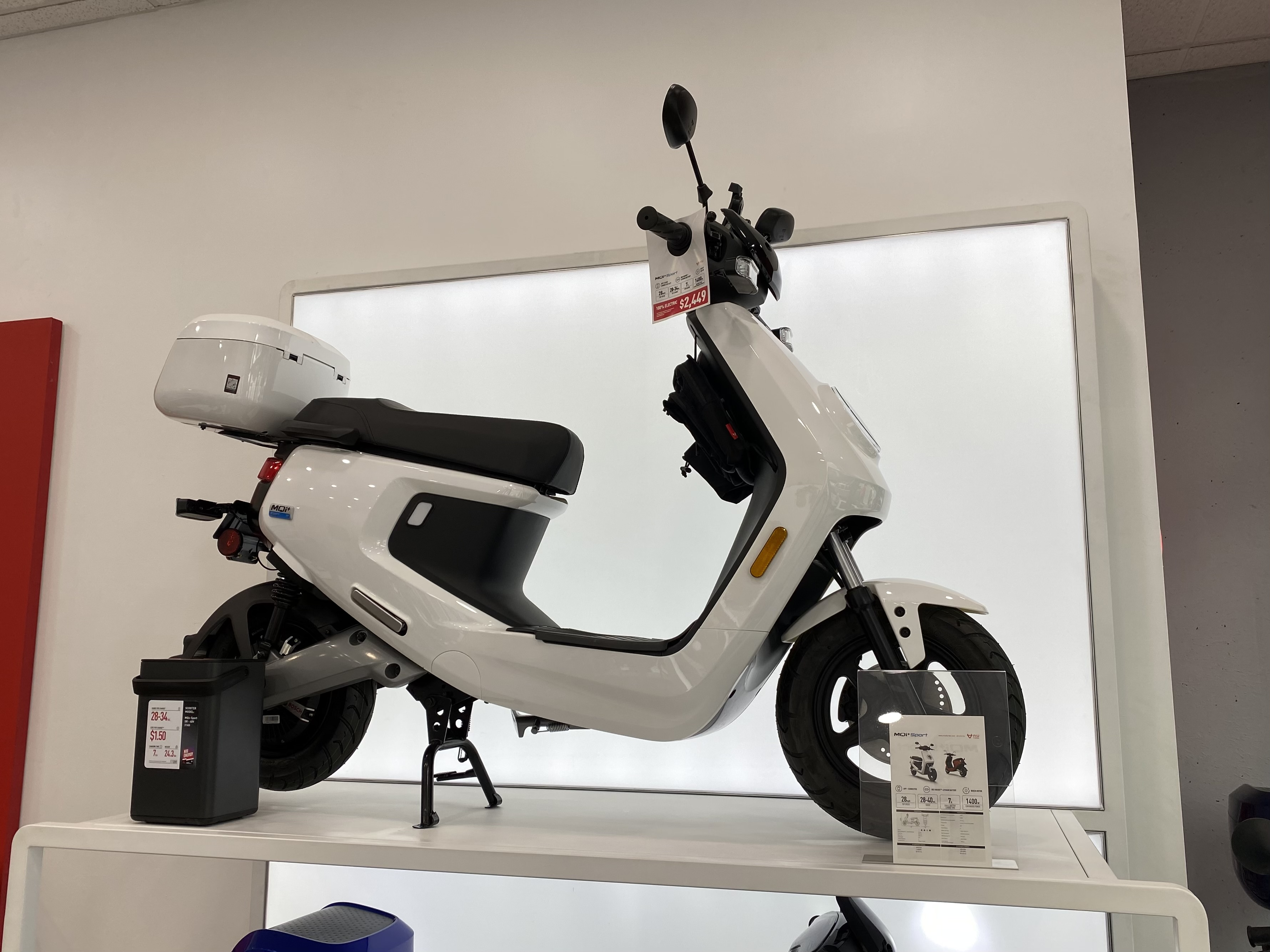
Niu Smart Electric Scooter in a Miami, Florida showroom.

== Finances ==
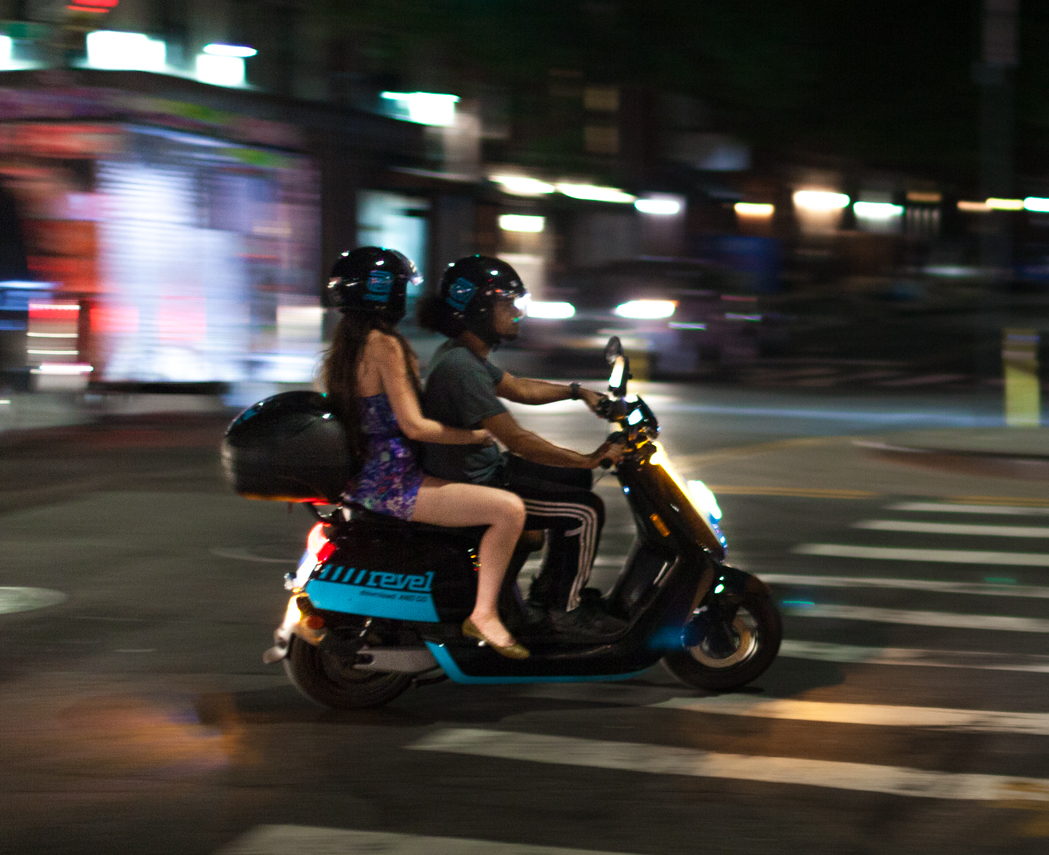
Sales also include bulk scooters sold to rideshare companies.

It had nearly $300M in revenue in 2019. It has raised over US$125 million in funding from investors.

In its March 17, 2025 release covering the fourth quarter and full year 2024, NIU reported full-year 2024 revenues of RMB 3,288.3 million (up 24.0% year-over-year) and a full-year net loss of RMB 193.2 million (an improvement from 2023).

Year	*Total Revenue (US$ Mil)	*Net Income (US$ Mil)
2018	215	-50
2019	298	27
2020	375	25
2021	581	35
2022	459	-7
2023	373	-38
2024	450	-26
2025	616	-6

* US$ figures converted by NIU at the year-end RMB/US$ rate published in each annual results release.

== Key products ==
NIU's product range covers electric mopeds and scooters, electric motorcycles, kick-scooters and e-bikes, sold under model families including NQiX, FQiX, NQi, MQi, UQi, FQi, XQi, RQi, KQi and BQi. The company has launched most of its recent European models at the EICMA motorcycle show in Milan.

=== NQiX Series ===
In November 2024, NIU previewed the NQiX Series, a redesign of its original NQi moped line, in 150, 300 and 500 variants. A top NQiX 1000 version was announced for Europe from the third quarter of 2025. The series introduced the "NIU Link Crown", a handlebar dial that lets riders adjust acceleration and torque while riding. NIU's website presents the series as a tribute to the NQi, which marked its tenth anniversary.

At EICMA 2025 on 4 November 2025, NIU announced 2026 updates for all NQiX models, including onboard Google Maps navigation and efficiency improvements to the battery and motor, along with a new flagship, the NQiX 1000. NIU stated the NQiX 1000 has a peak power of 15.5 kW, a top speed of 125 km/h and a range of over 100 km from three removable 72 V batteries, with European availability planned from the third quarter of 2026 at a starting price of €6,499.

=== FQiX Series ===
The FQiX Series succeeds the FQi 300 and FQi 500 shown in 2024. It had its world premiere at EICMA 2025 as a new urban design platform with a 5-inch TFT display, rear radar and the Link Crown interface. It can be unlocked by Bluetooth, NFC, the NIU app or a passcode.

The series comprises two models. The FQiX 150 is in the AM licence class (50 cc equivalent), with a top speed of 45 km/h. The FQiX 300 is in the A1 class (125 cc equivalent), with a top speed of 80 km/h. Both quote a range of up to 110 km with two batteries. By July 2026 the series was on sale at participating European dealers, from €2,499 (FQiX 150) and €2,999 (FQiX 300), including a special edition developed with gaming brand Razer.

=== XQi Series ===
NIU announced its first electric dirt bike, the XQi3, in 2023, in street-legal and off-road versions. At EICMA 2025 the company announced a relaunched XQi 300 and two new models, the XQi 400 and XQi 500 Street, for European markets in the second half of 2026. NIU stated the street-legal XQi 500 Street has a peak power of 28.8 kW

== Awards and recognition ==
NIU products have received a number of design and press awards. Entries marked with a dagger (†) are listed by NIU itself and have not been confirmed by the awarding body.

Year	Award	Product	Awarding body
2017	Red Dot Design Award†	M1	Red Dot
2017	IDEA Award (Silver)†	M1	Industrial Designers Society of America
2017	Good Design Award (G Mark)†	M1	Japan Institute of Design Promotion
2018	Red Dot Design Award†	U1	Red Dot
2018	IDEA Award (Silver)†	U1	Industrial Designers Society of America
2018	Good Design Award (G Mark)†	U1	Japan Institute of Design Promotion
2022	Best all-round kick-scooter†	KQi2	Electric Scooter Guide
2023	Rider's Choice Award for Best Scooter Company	NIU (company)	Micromobility World
2023	Red Dot Design Award (Product Design)	UQi+	Red Dot
2023	Red Dot Design Award: Best of the Best (Product Design)	SQi	Red Dot
2023	iF Design Award	KQi2 Pro	iF International Forum Design
2023	iF Design Award	KQi Youth+	iF International Forum Design
2023	Best of IFA (Gadget Match)†	KQi Air X	IFA Berlin
2023	New York Product Design Award (Gold, Vehicle Technologies)†	KQi3 Pro	New York Product Design Awards
2023	Best Electric Scooter 2023†	KQi3 Max	Tom's Guide
2024	Red Dot Design Award (Product Design)	XQi3	Red Dot
2024	Good Design Award (G Mark)†	XQi3	Japan Institute of Design Promotion
2024	Golden Pin Design Award (Best Design)†	XQi3	Golden Pin Design Award (Taiwan)
2025	Red Dot Design Award†	NQiX	Red Dot
2026	1000PS Top Awards: Top 10 Elektroroller, 1st place	NQiX 500	1000PS
2026	1000PS Top Awards: Top 10 Elektroroller, 3rd place	MQi GT	1000PS
2026	1000PS Top Awards: Top 10 Elektroroller, 4th place (shared)	NQi GTS	1000PS
2026	1000PS Top Awards: Top 10 Elektroroller, 8th place	FQi	1000PS

== See also ==
- Electric vehicle industry in China
