= Erik Parker =

American painter

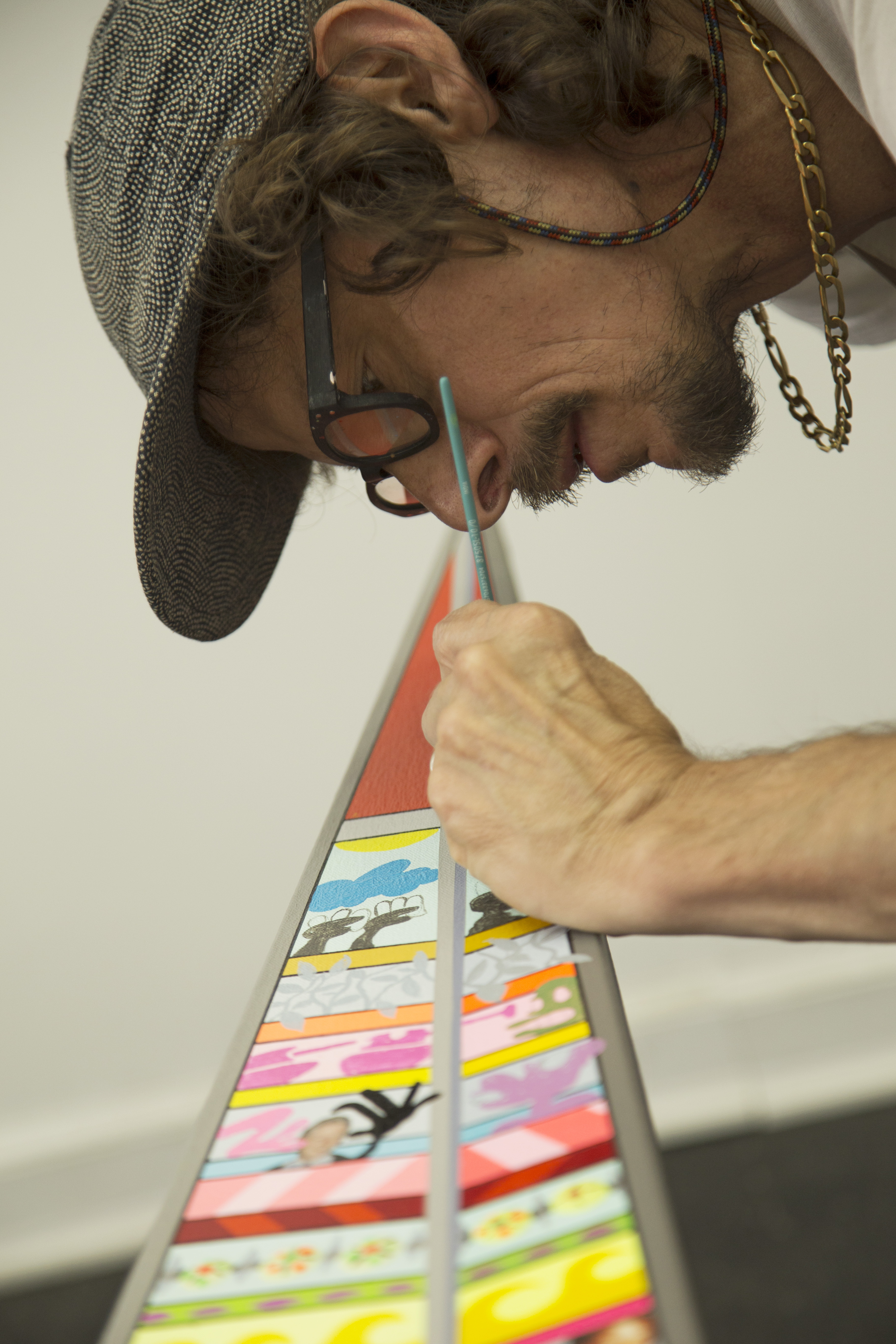
- Born: 1968 (age 57–58); Stuttgart, West Germany
- Education: University of Texas at Austin & Purchase College
- Known for: Painting

Erik Parker (born 1968) is a New York-based artist known for cartoonish compositions that riff on the traditional genres of portraiture and still life. His paintings draw inspiration from American subculture—psychedelia, underground comic books, music genres, as well as historic modern painters.

Parker studied at the University of Texas, Austin with Peter Saul before receiving an MFA from Purchase College of the State University of New York. Solo exhibitions include Cornerhouse Gallery in Manchester, England; De Appel in Amsterdam; the Modern Art Museum of Fort Worth; Colette in Paris; Honor Fraser in Los Angeles; and Galleri Faurschou in Copenhagen.

== Life and work ==
Erik Parker was born in Stuttgart, West Germany but later moved to San Antonio, Texas. Parker attended the University of Texas at Austin and studied with teachers including Peter Saul. He later received an MFA from Purchase College in New York.

Erik Parker is known for his precisely brightly colored, layered and highly saturated canvases. Parker's work depicts unique, fantastical scenes of biomorphic subjects and landscapes. Parker methodically paints each composition creating an intense visual experience. His work maintains a premeditated sense of order; at the same time, his composition is composed of bold and fragmented forms. Parker employs many styles in his work, from graffiti to psychedelic album covers and cartoons. Drawing from elements of American subculture, Parker creates color infused paintings that illustrate his take on the pressing issues of our time.

== Solo exhibitions ==
Year	Exhibition	Gallery/Museum	Location
2018	New Mood	Mary Boone Gallery	New York, NY
2017	Run with the Hunted	Aishonanzuka	Hong Kong, China
2016	Double Down	Nanzuka	Tokyo, Japan
2015	Undertow	Paul Kasmin Gallery	New York, NY
2015	¿What About Now?	Galería Javier López & Fer Francés	Madrid, Spain
2013	New Magnetic Destiny	Honor Fraser Gallery	Los Angeles, CA
2012	Upswing Dub Project	Pace Prints	New York, NY
2012	Too Mad to Be Scared	Aldrich Contemporary Art Museum	Ridgefield, CT
2012	Other side of Morning and Bermuda	Patricia Low Contemporary	Gstaad
2011	Re-Upped	Colette	Paris, France
2011	Focus: Erik Parker	Modern Art Museum of Fort Worth	Fort Worth, TX
2010	Endless Anytime	Honor Fraser	Los Angeles, CA
2010	Adapt	Galleri Faurschou	Copenhagen, Denmark
2009	Crisis Creation	Paul Kasmin Gallery	New York, NY
2008	Between Lines	Marianne Boesky	New York, NY
2007	Liner Notes	De Appel	Amsterdam
2007	Damage Control	Honor Fraser	Los Angeles, CA
2006	Half Cocked	Taka Ishii Gallery	Tokyo, Japan

== Awards ==
- Rema Hort-Mann Foundation Grant (1999)
- Purchase College 25th Anniversary Scholarship (SUNY Purchase College) (1997)
- Rose Scholarship (Visual Arts Department, SUNY Purchase College) (1997)
- Durhurst Family Scholarship (Visual Arts Department, SUNY Purchase College) (1997)
- Excellence in Painting (Department of Art & Art History, University of Texas at Austin) (1995)
- Merit Scholarship in Painting and Drawing (University of Texas at Austin)(1994)
- Denbela-Ortiz Galeria Outstanding Scholarship in Visual Art (San Antonio College) (1992)

== Books ==
Erik Parker Personae, book published by Honor Fraser Inc. Los Angeles, California 2008. ISBN 0978560221, with text by Max Henry, designed by Brian Roettinger.

Erik Parker: Colorful Resistance, book published by Rizzoli 2012. ISBN 0847838943, with text by Monica Ramirez-Montagut (Author), Peter Saul (Foreword)
