= Jammie Holmes =

American artist

- Born: 1984 (age 41–42); Thibodaux, Louisiana
- Education: Self-taught as painter
- Known for: Painting, public art
- Website: www.jammieholmes.com

Jammie Holmes (born 1984) is an American painter and public artist. As a painter, he is known for work that represents scenes of Black life in the American deep south, paying particular attention to the contrast of Louisiana as a hub of hospitality and as a place with a deep history of poverty and racism. He has been described as a self-taught painter. Holmes lives and works in Dallas, Texas.

== Early life ==
Holmes was born and raised in Thibodaux, Louisiana. He grew up in a place surrounded by reminders of slavery along with the labor union conflicts which have had an intense presence since the Thibodaux Massacre of 1887.

== Art career ==
In 2020 Holmes staged a performance where George Floyd's last words were attached to airplane banners and flown above New York City, Dallas, Los Angeles, Detroit, and Miami. The words appeared in large block text; in Detroit the banner read "PLEASE I CAN’T BREATHE", while in New York city it read "THEY’RE GOING TO KILL ME". In 2021 he presented the billboard project I'VE SEEN IT ALL in Dallas, Texas.

His paintings are included in the collections of the Museum of Fine Arts, Houston and the Scantland collection at the Columbus Museum of Art.

== Exhibitions ==
- Conception Art Show, Dallas, TX (2017)
- My Colors, Pocket Art Studio, Rome, Italy (2018)
- Permanent, Mega Art Gallery, Corchiano, Italy (2018)
- Conception Art Show, Dallas, TX (2018)
- Clean Water, Stella Jones Gallery, New Orleans, LA (2019)
- No Dead Artists, Jonathan Ferrara Gallery, New Orleans, LA (2019)
- LA Artcore 5th Annual Juried Exhibition (2019)
- What We Talking About, Marianne Boesky Gallery (2022)
- Pieces of a Man, Library Street Collective, Detroit (2021)
- What Happened to the Soul Food?, Gana Art Gallery, Korea (2022)
- SomewhereinAmerica, Various Small Fires, Los Angeles (2023)
- Jammie Holmes: Make the Revolution Irresistible, Modern Art Museum of Fort Worth, Fort Worth, Texas (2023)
