= Nir Hod =

Israeli artist based in New York (born 1970)

- ניר הוד
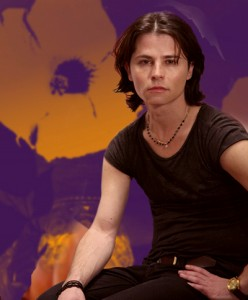
- Born: 1971 (age 54–55); Tel Aviv
- Education: Bezalel Academy of Art and Design, Cooper Union School of Art
- Known for: Painting, sculpture, video art
- Website: nirhod.com

Nir Hod (Hebrew: ניר הוד; born 1970) is an Israeli visual artist, based in New York. He works in the mediums of painting, sculpture, and video art.

== Life and work ==
Nir Hod was born in 1970, in Tel Aviv, Israel. Hod studied at Jerusalem's Bezalel Academy of Arts and Design, and New York City's Cooper Union School of Art.

He began his career in video, works in sculpture but is known for his high realism paintings. His work investigates old notions of hyper-seriousness and personal authenticity. Hod's realistic takes on rakish narcissism examine androgyny, identity, sexual confusion, and excess. As Richard Vine wrote in the catalogue for Hod's survey exhibition at the Tel Aviv Museum of Art, “From the beginning of his career, Nir Hod has opposed the ideology that labels sumptuousness an esthetic sin. His work openly substitutes the pleasure principle and a fluid multiplicity of selves for the old notions of high seriousness and personal authenticity.” In his recent series of “Genius” paintings and sculptures, Hod depicted aristocratic young men and women whose cherubic cheeks contrast with their scornful expressions and smoldering cigarettes.

For his solo exhibition at Paul Kasmin Gallery, Mother, Hod created a series of paintings that reference the iconic photograph, taken by the Nazi photographer Franz Konrad, of Nazi soldiers clearing out the Warsaw Ghetto during the Second World War. Although most of the scholarship and speculation about this photograph has centered on the identity of the young boy with his arms raised, Hod's paintings focus on the woman in profile closest to the photographer. By removing this faceless and often overlooked woman from the historical context of the original photograph, he asks the viewer to consider who she was and to imagine the life that she could have had. Hod depicts her posing or dancing against a lush, cinematically lit background, a beautiful handbag draped across her arm. Alluring and fashionable, the woman in these paintings has completely escaped from the horrible reality of the original photograph.

== Solo exhibitions ==
- 2020: "The Life We Left Behind", Kohn Gallery, Los Angeles
- 2018: "The Life We Left Behind", Gavlak Gallery, Palm Bech
- 2018: "The Life We Left Behind", Makasiini Contemporary Gallery, Finland
- 2015: "Life and Death of a Star", Michael Fuchs Gallery, Berlin, Germany
- 2014: “Once Every Thing Was Much Better Even the Future”, Paul Kasmin Gallery, New York
- 2012: “Mother,” Paul Kasmin Gallery, New York
- 2011: “Genius,” Paul Kasmin Gallery, New York
- 2008: “Nova 7,” Alon Segev Gallery, Israel
- 2007: “Faded Heartache,” Davide Gallo Gallery, Berlin
- 2006: “You Are Not Alone,” Jack Shainman Gallery, New York
- 2005: “Forever,” Tel Aviv Museum of Art, Tel Aviv
  - “Luna a Las Vegas,” Alon Segev Gallery, Tel Aviv
- 2001: “Destiny's Days,” Rosenfeld Gallery, Tel Aviv
- 2000: “Heroes’ Tears,” The Borowsky Gallery at the Gershman Y, Philadelphia
  - “Controversial Innocence,” Rosenfeld Gallery, Tel Aviv
  - “Nir Hod,” Liebman Magnan Gallery, New York
- 1999: “Forever,” Lime Light Club, New York
- 1998: “Forever,” Liebman Magnan Gallery, New York; Wolfson Galleries at Miami-Dade College, Miami
  - “Bleeding Hearts,” The Opera House, Tel Aviv
- 1997: “DOHRIN: The Last Painting,” The Museum of Israeli Art, Ramat Gan, Israel
  - “A Souvenir from November,” Mary Fauzi Gallery, Tel Aviv
- 1996: “The Brush of the Heart,” Noga Gallery of Contemporary Art, Tel Aviv

== Press ==
- Shiffman, Allyson, "Nir Hod and the Importance of Narcissism," Interview, 7/13.
- Cembalest, Robin, "Painting Auschwitz Blue," ArtNews, 1/10/13.
- Phelan, Amy, "Document No.46: New Geniuses Born," Document Journal, Fall '12/Winter '13.
- Cembalest, Robin, "Holocaust Imagery As Art," Tablet Magazine, 3/26/12.
- Slenske, Michael, "The Kids Are All Right? The Paintings of Nir Hod," Art in America, 5/16/11.
