= Marianne Boesky Gallery =

Art gallery in New York and Colorado, US

Coordinates: 39.18971°N 106.81555°W

Marianne Boesky Gallery is an art gallery located in the New York City neighborhood of Chelsea and Aspen, Colorado. Founded in 1996 in Soho by Marianne Boesky, it specializes in contemporary art. It represents established artists like Frank Stella and Jennifer Bartlett and a younger generation of artists like Sanford Biggers, The Haas Brothers, and Jammie Holmes. The gallery has two exhibition spaces in New York City and one in Aspen.

== History ==
The daughter of Ivan Boesky, Marianne Boesky founded her eponymous gallery in Soho in 1996. She developed her program by representing and introducing the art world to Lisa Yuskavage, Takashi Murakami, and Yoshitomo Nara.

From 2000 to 2005, Marianne Boesky Gallery leased a space in a building with many galleries on West 22nd Street in Chelsea. In 2006, the gallery commissioned a 10,000-square-foot building at 509 West 24th Street from architect Deborah Berke. From 2010 to 2016, it operated a space on East 64th Street. In 2014, the gallery expanded to the Lower East Side although this space was later closed in 2016 to expand the Chelsea location. In 2017, Boesky opened a location in Aspen, Colorado designed by the architect Annabelle Selldorf.

== Artists ==
Marianne Boesky represents living artists, including:

- Ghada Amer
- Gina Beavers
- Sanford Biggers
- Björn Braun (since 2015)
- Pier Paolo Calzolari
- Julia Dault
- Sue de Beer
- Svenja Deininger
- Barnaby Furnas
- The Haas Brothers (since 2018)
- Allison Janae Hamilton
- Jay Heikes
- John Houck (since 2017)
- Jessica Jackson Hutchins
- Dashiell Manley (since 2016)
- Sarah Meyohas (since 2022)
- Donald Moffett
- Serge Alain Nitegeka
- William J. O'Brien
- Hans Op de Beeck
- Anthony Pearson
- Thiago Rocha Pitta
- Hannah Van Bart
- John Waters
- Claudia Wieser

In addition, the gallery manages various artist estates, including:

- Jennifer Bartlett (since 2018)
- Thornton Dial (since 2015)
- Maria Lai (since 2017)
- Salvatore Scarpitta

In addition, the gallery manages various artist estates, including:

- Takashi Murakami
- Frank Stella
- Lisa Yuskavage

== Personal life ==
Boesky married equity sales trader Liam Culman in 2003, and their daughter, Ellie, was born the following year.
