= Swoon (artist) =

American graffiti artist

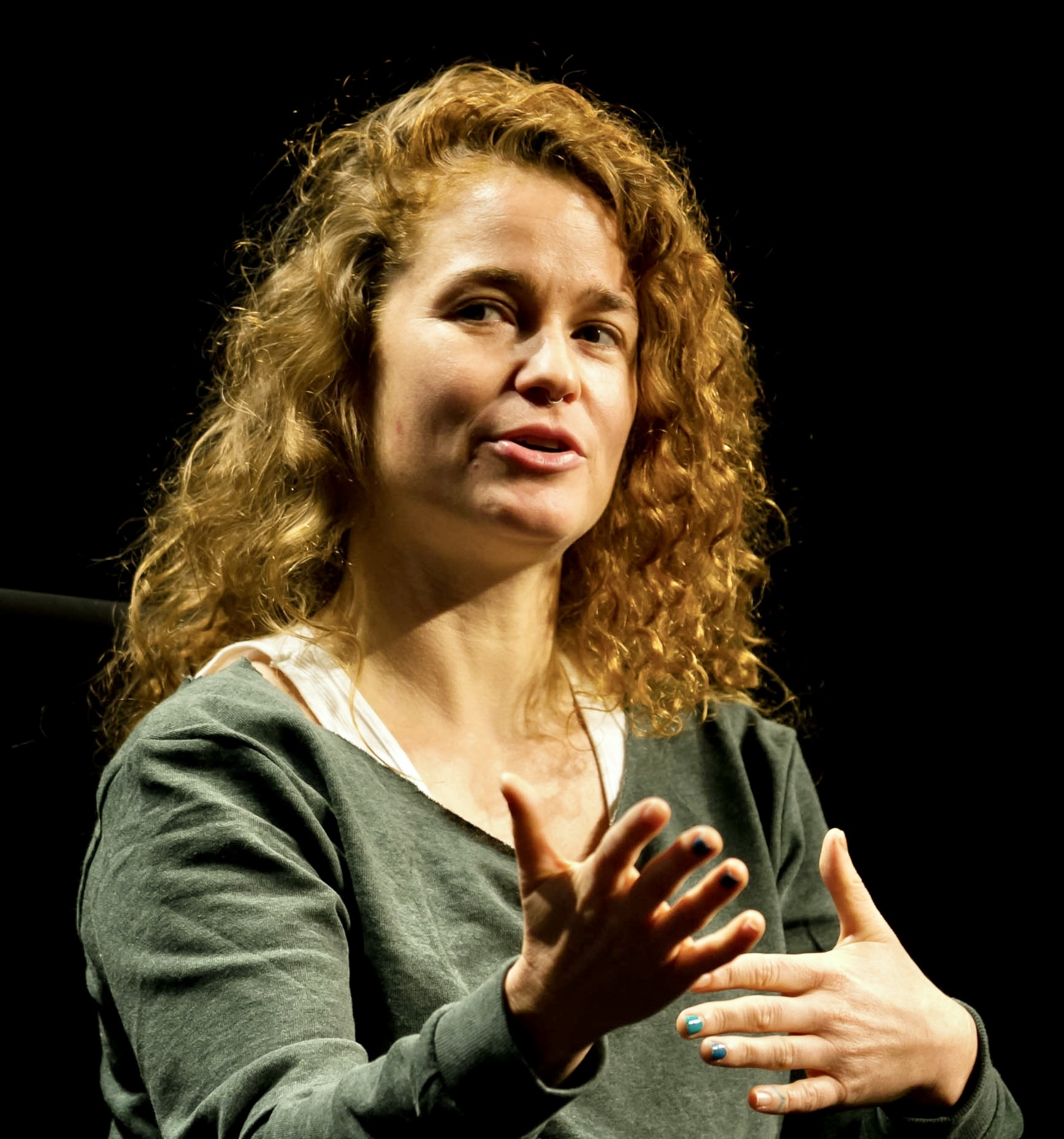
- Swoon at the PopTech conference, 2014, Camden, Maine
- Born: Caledonia Dance Curry; 1977 (age 48–49); New London, Connecticut, U.S.
- Education: Pratt Institute
- Known for: Street arts, community engaged art, site-specific installation, printmaking, sculpture, stop-motion animation

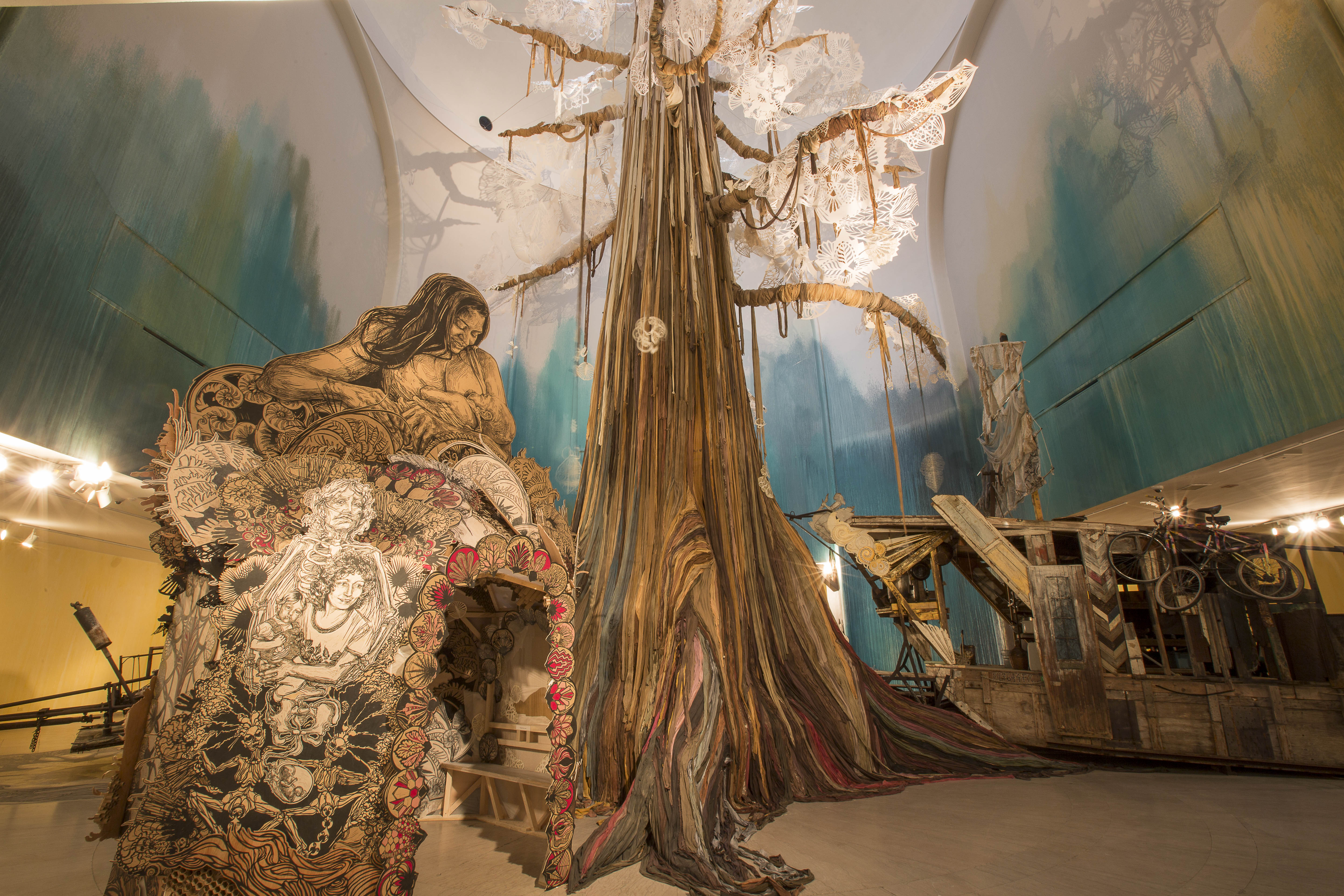
SWOON: Submerged Motherlands, Brooklyn Museum 2014 Photo: Tod Seelie

Caledonia Dance Curry (born 1977), whose work appears under the name Swoon, is an American contemporary artist who works with printmaking, sculpture, and stop-motion animation to create immersive installations, community-based projects and public artworks. She is best known as one of the first women street artists to gain international recognition. Her work centers the transformative capacity of art as a catalyst for healing within communities experiencing crisis.

== Early life and education ==
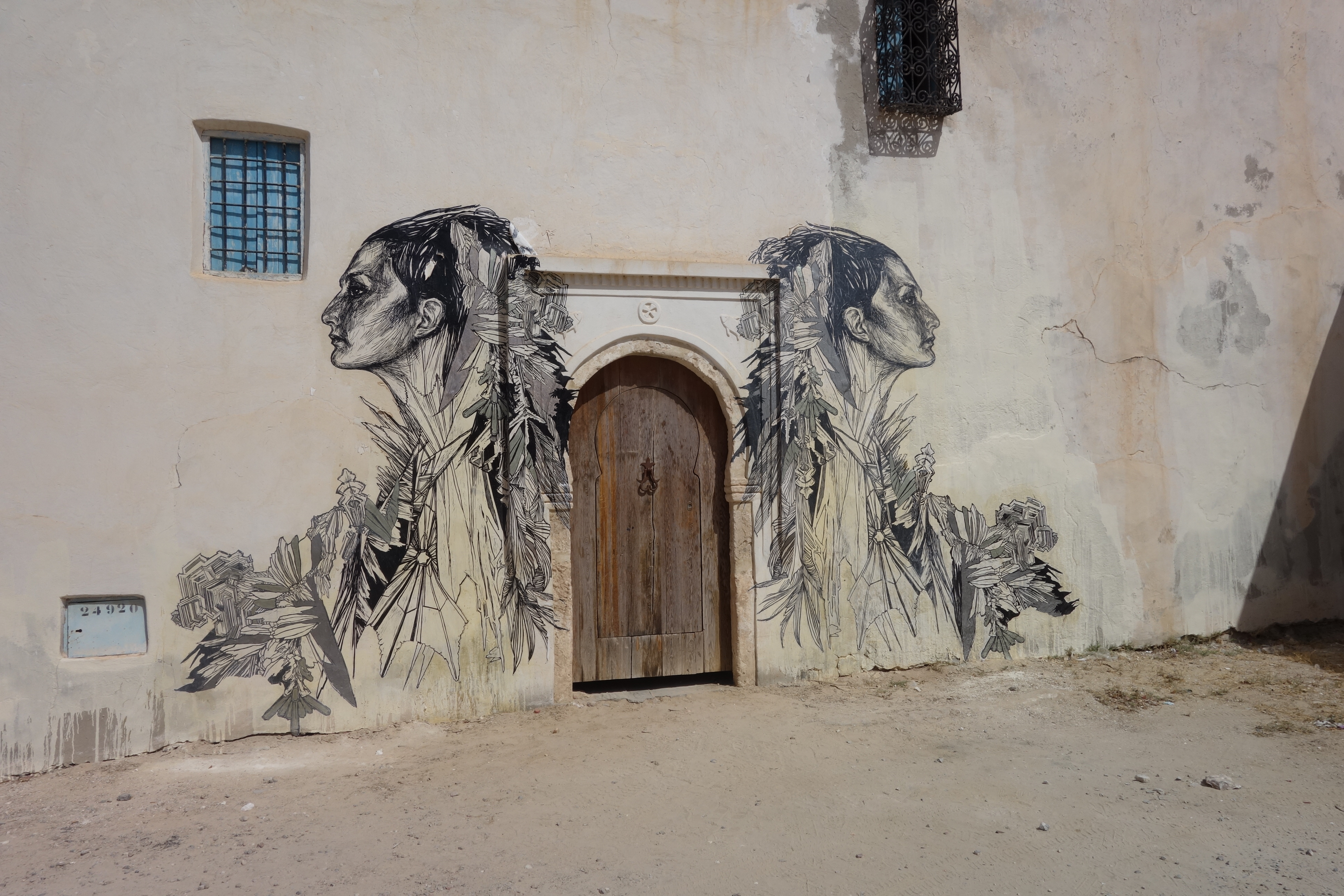
A work by Swoon in Djerbahood, Tunisia

Caledonia Curry was born in New London, Connecticut, and raised in Daytona Beach, Florida. Both of her parents struggled with opioid addiction. At the age of 10, her mother enrolled her in art classes for retirees. Curry said, "the 80-year-old retired painters adopted me, they taught me how to paint. I’ve [become] a focused, confident artist because of them."

At nineteen, she moved to the Borough Park section of Brooklyn, New York, to study painting at the Pratt Institute, which she attended from 1998 to 2001. She received a classical Western education in both technique and career trajectory, which she viewed as too limited. She said “they’d tell me this is how you paint, these are the galleries that you will work with, and this is how your life is going to be.”

In 1999, searching to carve her own pathway and make her work more accessible to everyday people, she began pasting her paper portraits to the sides of buildings. At first, she pasted work anonymously. Later, she took the moniker Swoon, which appeared in a friend’s dream.

While at Pratt she joined activist groups and involved in feminist advocacy as a founding member of the TOYSHOP Collective, a women-run street theater group known for clandestine events in New York City.

== Career and work ==
=== Street art ===
Swoon is widely known as one of the first women to achieve large-scale recognition as a street artist. She was part of a group of artists early 00s, including JR and Banksy, that were committed to pushing the forms and conceptual limits of the Street Art genre.

Swoon has wheatpasted her intricate portraits on city streets around the world, including New York, Detroit, San Francisco, London, Bilbao, Hong Kong, Djerba, Cairo, Tokyo, and Jogjakarta.

She has been included in public art interventions including Santa’s Ghetto (2007), a clandestine installation on the West Bank barrier wall in Bethlehem, organized by Banksy; Hecho en Oaxaca (2013), and indoor and outdoor exhibition of Street Art organized by Museo de Arte Contemporáneo Oaxaca; and Open Source (2015) a city-wide public art exhibition organized by Philadelphia Mural Arts, featuring the mural 5 Stories, created in tandem with arts therapy workshops with participants in the Mural Arts Restorative Justice Program. In 2006 she was featured in Upper Playground's "The Run Up" a DVD featuring visual artists from the contemporary art movement.

Her intricate wheatpaste portraits are created by carving wood or linoleum blocks, which are then printed by hand, or by cutting through several layers of paper at once. Her imagery is drawn from friends, family and other people she has met whose lives she wants to honor. She often elevates subjects who are unseen or overlooked within the urban landscape, or marginalized within the infrastructure of the city itself.

Her memorial portrait of Silvia Elena Morales (2008), who was murdered in Juarez, Mexico, addressed the ongoing femicides that have claimed the lives of thousands of women in Mexico and Central America since 1993. In a visit to Juarez, Curry met with mothers who had lost their daughters, and with activists who were working to increase public awareness and to push for justice. The piece was installed in 2012 at Benito Juarez Plaza, the place where Sylvia Elena is thought to have disappeared, four years after it was created because of delays caused by escalating violence. Curry’s intention behind the memorial was “that we can see the face of Sylvia Elena, and recognize our connectedness with each of the thousands of women who have gone missing, with each of the family members who mourn the loss of their brightest light, and with a town in the shadow of the U.S. border, caught in a strangle hold of incomprehensible violence.”

=== Deitch Projects ===
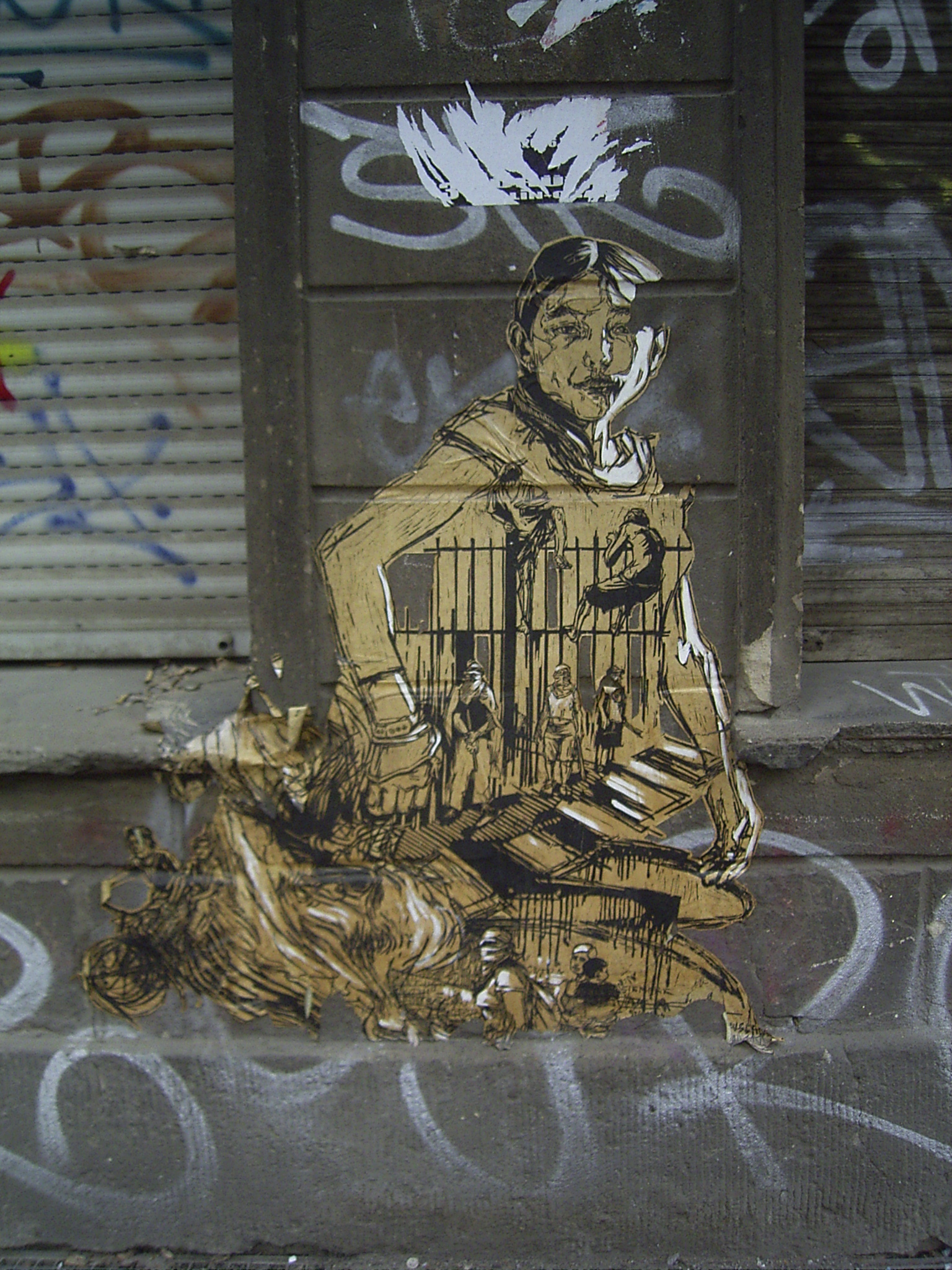
A work by Swoon in Berlin

In 2005, the Deitch Projects gallery held Swoon’s first New York solo exhibition: Swoon. The interior and the facade of the gallery was transformed into a cityscape populated by intricate cut out figures and block-prints set within sculptural elements referencing truss-work, power-lines and elevated trains. Drawing on Kowloon Walled City was the creative point of departure, Curry hoped to evoke the spontaneous, unregulated, and self built development that took place in the autonomous Hong Kong neighborhood before it was bulldozed in 1993.

In 2008, Swoon returned to Deitch Projects for a two-part exhibition, Swimming Cities of Switchback Sea. It included seven handmade boats that embarked from Troy, New York, staging public performances in the towns along the Hudson River. Swoon worked with Lisa D’Amour (playwright), Sxip Shirey (circus composer), and Dark Dark Dark (original music) to create the performance that was set on the boats. The rafts arrived at Deitch Studios in Long Island City on September 7, 2008. The boats were tethered by ropes to the skirts of a twenty-five-foot-high paper sculpture of two sisters embracing, the central image of the indoor portion of the show. Deitch Studios was divided into two levels, above and below an imaginary flood line. Curry imagined that if the water of the East River were to rise, her boats could float into the shelter of the gallery space.

She was included in Art in the Streets (2011), the first major museum survey of graffiti and street art, curated with Deitch, Roger Gastman and Aaron Rose.

In 2019, Curry had her third solo exhibition at Deitch Projects, Cicada. The show featured her first stop-motion animation. The short film uses mythological figures and allegory, including a “Tarantula Mother.”

=== Other exhibitions ===
In 2005 her work was featured in Greater New York at P.S.1 Contemporary Art Center, and in 2006, she was included in Since 2000: Printmaking Now, a group exhibition showcasing prints from MoMA’s collection.

Since 2005, Swoon has created over 20 solo exhibitions, most of which are immersive, site-specific installations, in museums and commercial galleries around the world. Her major exhibitions include Seven Contemplations at the Albright-Knox Foundation (2020), Haven at the Skissernas Museum (2017), The Light After at Library Street Collective (2016), Submerged Motherlands at the Brooklyn Museum (2014) which was their first exhibition dedicated to a living street artist, Honeycomb at SNOW Contemporary (2012), Anthropocene Extinction at The Institute of Contemporary Art: Boston (2011), Swimming Cities of Switchback Sea at Deitch Projects (2008), Drown Your Boats at New Image Art Gallery (2008), and Swoon at Deitch Projects (2005).

She has also been included in significant group exhibitions including Radical Seafaring at The Parrish Museum of Art (2016), a survey that argues that the work created on the water by contemporary artists is approaching the critical mass of the Land Art movement of the 1960s and 70s; and Catastrophe and the Power of Art at the Mori Art Museum (2018), which considers the role art can play in recovery from major catastrophes that strike communities, as well as personal tragedies.

Swoon’s first museum retrospective, The Canyon: 1999-2017, opened on September 22, 2017, at the Contemporary Arts Center Cincinnati. The exhibition showcased multiple dimensions of Curry’s practice, including the new site-specific installation Medea, that visually centers around the portrait of a home that is splitting apart, re-stagings of past landmark projects, and a survey of her socially-driven work in Braddock, Pennsylvania and Cormiers, Haiti.

=== Art as activism ===
Swoon’s site-specific exhibitions are in close dialogue with her activism and advocacy efforts, which explore the power of art to respond to crises caused by natural disasters, structural violence, and addiction. In 2015, she began working with Philadelphia Mural Arts on the multi-platform project 5 Stories. The project drew from her experience growing up in an opioid addicted family. Participants worked with Curry, therapist and yoga instructor Jessica Radovich, and storytelling coach Heather Box of the Million Person Project in a month-long art therapy and personal storytelling course that took place inside Graterford State Correctional Institution (SCI), at the Interim House treatment center, and with Philadelphia Mural Arts Guild, a prison-to-community reentry program. The classes addressed the relationship between trauma, loss, addiction and mass incarceration. In addition to this community engagement, Curry created several portraits of those who have participated in the project, which were incorporated into a public mural at 3060 West Jefferson St in North Philadelphia.

Curry returned to Philadelphia in 2018 to continue her harm-reduction advocacy with Philadelphia Mural Arts, Jessica Radovich, Heather Box, and Julian Mocine-Mcqueen. Curry cites Dr. Gabor Mate, author of In the Realm of Hungry Ghosts, as someone who changed her perspective by helping her understand that addictions are a desperate attempt to soothe unmanageable pain.

The Road Home hosted daily drop-in workshops at the Kensington Storefront, located across the street from Prevention Point, a center that provides services to people experiencing homelessness and addiction. The project culminated in a public conference at the University of Pennsylvania with Dr. Gabor Mate as the keynote speaker, a private workshop with members of Philadelphia’s Department of Behavioral Health and Intellectual disAbility Services, and a public mural, Healing Begins with Connection, across the street from Prevention Point in Kensington.

== Collaborative projects ==
=== Music Box ===
The Music Box was the first iteration of Music Box Village, an immersive, experimental, fully playable musical environment in New Orleans founded by Swoon and artist-led organization New Orleans Airlift. In 2010, Swoon, with co-founding artists Taylor Lee Shepherd and Delaney Martin, developed the concept of musical architecture. In 2011, they invited 25 artists to create a site-specific installation of musical houses as an initial prototype for what musical architecture could look and sound like. This original installation was built out of salvaged materials from a collapsed Creole Cottage. The project began five years after Hurricane Katrina, in response to the long-term recovery of the city that continued to impact the livelihood of residents and the local musical culture. Curry’s intention was to cultivate a space for collective play to support the process of healing from disaster. She says "I hope it represents this very basic need in people while rebuilding to rebuild joyfully and with imagination."

On October 22, 2011, The Music Box hosted its debut performance playing the musical houses. Over the 9-month initial run, the Music Box received local and national attention. The project served over 15,000 guests and hosted over 70 New Orleans–based and international musicians.

After the initial run on Piety Street, the project created short-term performance installations in New Orleans City Park, Kyiv (Ukraine), Shreveport, Louisiana, Atlanta and Tampa, Florida. In 2016, the project was renamed Music Box Village and successfully raised funds to support a permanent location in New Orleans. Music Box Village ran a calendar of regular daytime and night-time performances. Music Box Village is the flagship project of New Orleans Airlift, a non-profit organization who foster opportunities through arts education and the creation of experimental public artworks.

=== Braddock Tiles ===
In 2007, Swoon and a group of friends were invited to purchase and restore an abandoned church in Braddock, Pennsylvania. Over the next 10 years, Swoon participated in a number of projects that focused on rehabilitating the structure in a way that would also engage and benefit the immediate surrounding community. These efforts included collaborating with local artist collective Transformazium on a deconstruction (as an alternative to demolition) initiative for fire-damaged sections of the building, creating a Super Adobe dome in the building’s disused parking lot, and, finally, the creation of Braddock Tiles.

Braddock Tiles began with the intention of restoring the roof of the church entirely from handmade artisanal tiles that would be created in a ceramics workshop in the basement of the church. This was conceived as a way to create well-paid jobs locally, fostering community reinvestment that would address the economic devastation caused by the closure of the manufacturing sector in Braddock.

In 2015, the scope of the project shifted in response to the large scale of resources needed to carry out the renovations needed to restore the church. Choosing to focus on the community building aspect of the project, Braddock Tiles began to work with an existing organization, the Braddock Youth Program, to create a job-readiness and soft skills program for youth ages 18- to 26-years-old, who had aged out of the youth program. The program was held in the Bathhouse Ceramics Studio, located within the historic Braddock Carnegie Library.

The Braddock Tiles ran from 2015 to 2018, and was developed collaboratively by Curry, KT Tierny and Katie Johnson. The program raised funds for paid apprenticeships for local youth, as well as host field trips, workshops and youth-led projects that included creating decorative murals for their community.

Curry and the Heliotrope Foundation are currently working to pass the care of the building into new hands. Curry has spoken publicly about the significance of this decision, and the importance of recognizing one’s own limitations.

=== Swimming Cities of Serenissima, 2009 ===
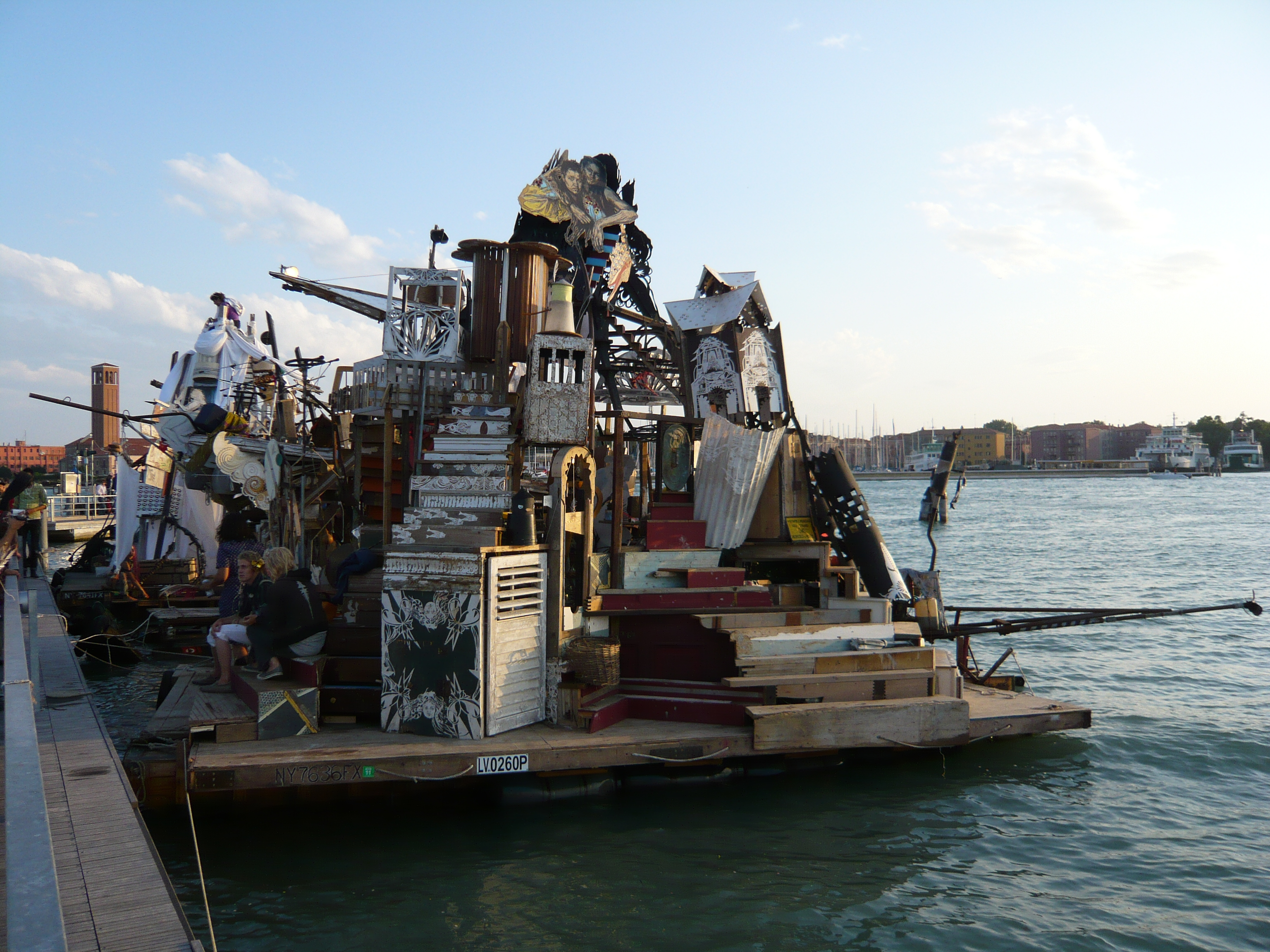
Swimming Cities of Serenissima

Swimming Cities of Serenissima was a fleet of sculptural junk rafts that crashed the 2009 Venice Biennale. The project was the last in a series of river-based projects founded or led by Swoon, which included Swimming Cities of Switchback Sea (2008) on the Hudson River, and The Miss Rockaway Armada (2006–2007) on the Mississippi River. Curry cites multiple sources of inspiration for Serenissima, including a brief time living on a sailboat in the Netherlands, Viking boats, and the impact of her first visit to Venice, where she was struck by the conversation between the water and architecture. She also credits the experience of the Miss Rockaway Armada for leading her to explore the possibilities of floating sculptures as a way to live and travel, while also building the knowledge and community necessary to attempt the complicated logistics of navigating rafts through the Venetian lagoon.

After her solo exhibition at Deitch Studios, Swoon deconstructed the rafts into shipping containers, which were sent overseas to Koper, Slovenia. The containers were initially held in customs because they were thought to be trash, until Swoon could provide documents that proved they were art. A crew of 30 collaborators worked at a marina in Koper until the rafts received approval by the Slovenian coast guard to leave port. A fleet of three rafts, named Maria, Alice and Old Hickory navigated an open crossing of the Adriatic Sea, before moving into the protected in-land Littoral canals of Italy.

Swimming Cities of Serenissima entered the Venetian Lagoon in May 2009. Swoon developed a collaborative performance with Ben Burke, Adina Bier and the Dark, Dark, Dark, that was staged on the rafts and performed to audiences on shore over the course of two weeks. The final performance was an illegal procession down the Grand Canal that began late at night, and ended as the sun rose. Serenissima’s last performance, as well as their journey across the Adriatic, was recorded in a documentary film by Paul Poet, Empire Me: New Worlds are Happening! (2011).

Although Swoon was not officially invited to the Biennale, Serenissma was lauded by the critic Jerry Saltz as the most moving moment of that years’ festival. He said, “Like the best work here, Swoon’s work doesn’t come out of academic critique; it comes from necessity and vision. These are the perfect tools for making things as old as time new again -- including an art world turned dangerously into itself.”

=== Konbit Shelter ===
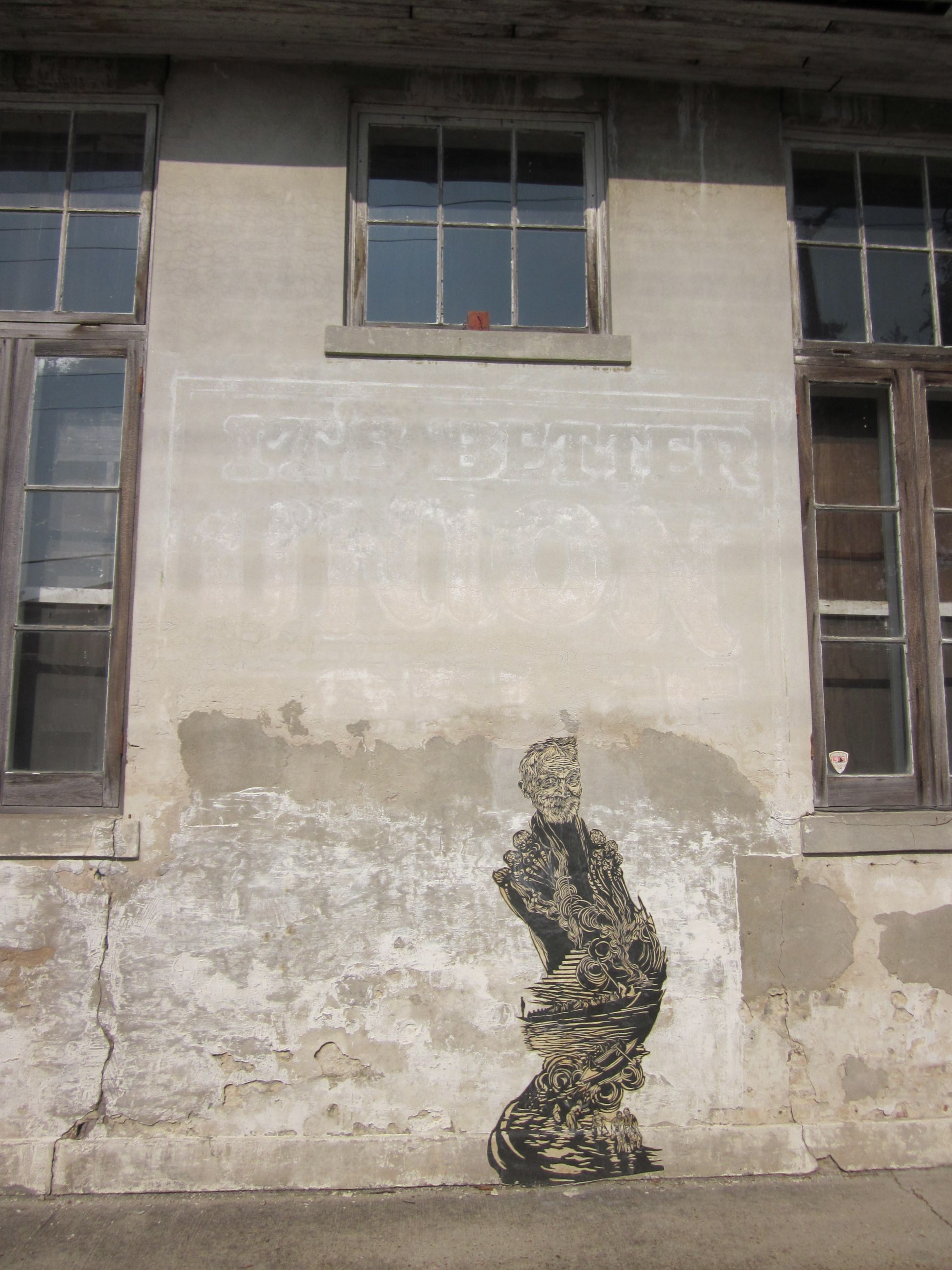
Burgundy Poland Union Swoon

Konbit Shelter was founded in 2010, in response to the earthquake in Haiti that killed more than 100,000 people and destroyed more than 250,000 homes. Curry led a small group of artists, engineers, and builders who connected with the village of Komye (Cormiers in French), 15 miles from the epicenter of the quake. The project’s mission centered on the belief that the creative process can help in this time of crisis. Konbit Shelter has focused on creating meaningful work and well-paid jobs for local residents while collectively creating beautiful permanent architectural answers to the problem of rebuilding from disaster using new strategies with limited resources.

Since 2010, Konbit Shelter has completed a community center and three single-family homes, each designed and adapted with feedback from the community. Local enthusiasm around the art and design elements of the construction process led to the creation of a Klub Obzevatwa, an ongoing after-school program founded in partnership with local teachers in Cormiers. Each week, Klub Obzevatwa teachers introduce 30-40 local kids to arts, crafts, and building design concepts that range from drawing, cooking, tile-setting, earthquake preparedness, Haitian culture and history, and games, song and dance.

Konbit Shelter and Klub Obzevatwa are currently the flagship projects supported by Swoon’s Heliotrope Foundation.

=== The Miss Rockaway Armada ===
The Miss Rockaway Armada, was a collectively realized semi-utopian experiment in communal living and home-made raft navigation that travelled down the Mississippi River from Minneapolis to St. Louis during two summers in 2006 and 2007. Swoon was one of several New York City–based artists that founded the initial concept, and who was instrumental in raising funds and other resources for its execution; however the project was led using a co-operative model that had as many as 70 rolling members over two years, and was not directed by Swoon.

Swoon cites her inspiration for the Miss Rockaway Armada on the Floating Neutrinos, a group of artists led by Poppa Neutrino, who lived communally on the water and successfully completed a trans-atlantic crossing on a hand-made junk raft in 1998; as well as a long tradition of punk boat culture in the city of Minneapolis.

The Miss Rockaway Armada was partially constructed in the Emergency Arts cooperative in Chelsea, before being transported to Minneapolis. They were designed using two VW diesel rabbit car engines that were modified to run long-arm boat propellers. The first version of the rafts included three twenty-foot long interconnected structures, pulling several tows, which made it nearly 100 feet long.

The rafts pushed off at White Sands in 2006, and performed musical variety shows and arts workshops in the towns along the river. The project dry docked at a restaurant and biker-bar called Ducky’s Lagoon in the Quad Cities when the weather became too cold to continue. In 2007, the rafts were reconfigured into smaller vessels, and new members joined who built new rafts. The flotilla travelled south to St. Louis, where they made an emergency landing on Bob Cassilly’s land, the founder of the City Museum of St. Louis, after river conditions became too dangerous to navigate.

While the remaining collective members camped on Cassilly’s land, the rafts were eventually all burned, or cut loose from shore and disappeared. When asked about how she felt about the project ending before reaching their New Orleans destination, Swoon said “The deep, deep truth of the matter is that I don’t regret it. I only regret that [the boats] were disposed of in an irresponsible way. The fact that no one died is basically a miracle, and if we had gone past Saint Louis where there are no locking dams with our boats, and our crew, and the culture we were building, it would’ve gotten really dangerous.”

=== Heliotrope Foundation ===
In 2015, Curry founded the Heliotrope Foundation to help support her community-based projects. Heliotrope projects have been supported by Kickstarter campaigns, fundraiser events and through ongoing affordable print sales featuring the work of local artists and artisans.

== Solo exhibitions ==
2026, Into the Forest, featuring new works from Swoon's Sibylant Sisters series, Turner Carroll Gallery, Santa Fe, NM, May 15-June 15.

2025, Homecoming, Curated by Turner Carroll Gallery and SAC Gallery, Bangkok, Thailand, January 30-April 6.

2023-2024, Swoon: A Retrospective, organized by Taubman Museum of Art, Roanoke, VA, traveling to Amarillo Museum of Art, Amarillo, Texas.

2023, Seven Contemplations, [CONTAINER]by Turner Carroll Gallery, Santa Fe, NM, October 28 - March 7.

2023,Gift in the Rupture, Mesa Arts Center, Mesa, Arizona

2020, Seven Contemplations, Albright-Knox Foundation, Buffalo, NY.

2020, The Heart Lives through the Hands, Contemporary Craft, Pittsburgh, PA, scheduled April 25 – August 1 (postponed in response to Covid-19)

2020, Asteraceae, Underdogs Gallery, Lisbon, Portugal, July 10 – August 8.

2020, Swoon: Time Capsule, multi-city travelling exhibition, Museum of Urban and Contemporary Art, Munich, Germany, May - August.

2020, The Slow Reprise, Galerie LJ, Paris, France, June 25 – September 26.

2019, Cicada, Deitch Projects, New York, NY, November 14 – February 1.

2019, Swoon: Time Capsule, multi-city travelling exhibition, Fluctuart Centre d’Art Urbain, Paris, France, July 4 – September 22.

2019, Swoon: Every Portrait is a Vessel, Treason Gallery, Seattle, WA, April 4 – May 18.

2019, Swoon, Galerie Henrik Springmann, Freiburg, Germany.

2018, Raggedy Hecate and the Memory Box, Chandran Gallery, San Francisco, CA, November 30 – February 8.

2018, Mirai Minima, SNOW Contemporary, Tokyo, Japan, October 6 – November 2.

2018, Swoon: New Works, Galerie LJ, Paris, France, October 11 – November 24.

2017, The Canyon: 1999–2017, retrospective, Contemporary Art Center, curated by Steven Matijcio, Cincinnati, OH, September 23 – February 25.

2017, To Accompany Something Invisible, Allouche Gallery, New York, NY, April 27 – May 21.

2017, Haven, Skissernas Museum, Malmö, Sweden, January 28 – November 21, 2018.

2016, Thalassa, Detroit Institute of Arts Museum, Detroit, MI, September 24 – June 25.

2016, The Light After, Library Street Collective, Detroit, MI, October 8 – November 26.

2016, City Lights, site-specific installation, MIMA Contemporary Art Museum, Brussels, Belgium, March 24 – August 28.

2014, Swoon: Submerged Motherlands, Brooklyn Museum, curated by Sharon Matt Atkins, Brooklyn, NY, April 11 – Aug. 24.

2013, Motherlands, Galerie LJ, Paris, France, November 30 – January 15.

2013, Petrichor, Manatee-Sarasota Fine Art Gallery, State College of Florida, Brandenton, FL, March 1 – April 3.

2012, Honeycomb, SNOW Contemporary, Tokyo, Japan, April 4 – May 20.

2011, Murmuration, site-specific installation, Black Rat Projects, London, England, December 1 – 24.

2011, Anthropocene Extinction, site-specific installation, The Institute of Contemporary Art, Boston, Massachusetts, September 3 – December 30, 2012.

2011, Swoon: Thalassa (The Great Hall Project), site-specific installation, New Orleans Museum of Art, New Orleans, LA, July 8 – September 25.

2011, Thekla, Metro Gallery, Melbourne, Australia, February 14 – March 5.

2010, Fata Morgana, Galerie LJ, Paris, France, October 24 – December 4.

2008, Swoon: Swimming Cities of Switchback Sea, site-specific installation with public performances, Deitch Studios, Long Island City, NY, September 7 – October 19.

2008, Portrait of Silvia Elena, Honey Space Gallery, New York, NY, May 2008.

2008, Drown Your Boats, New Image Art Gallery, Los Angeles, CA, February 16 – April 19.

2008, Swoon, site-specific installation, Deitch Projects, New York, NY, July 7 – August 13.

== Media appearances ==
- Swoon as herself, Inside Outside, 2005
- Swoon as herself, Our City Dreams, Chiara Clemente, 2009
- Swoon as herself, Exit Through the Gift Shop, Banksy, 2010
- Swoon as herself, TEDxBrooklyn - Callie Curry aka Swoon, TedTalk 2010
- Swoon as herself, From Street Art to High Art - The New York Times, 2014
- Swoon as herself, Swoon: From the Streets to the Galleries, 2016
- Swoon as herself, Swoon - Artist, 2017
- Swoon as herself, The 'C' Files with Maria Brito, 2019
