= Revel Transit =

Electric moped sharing company

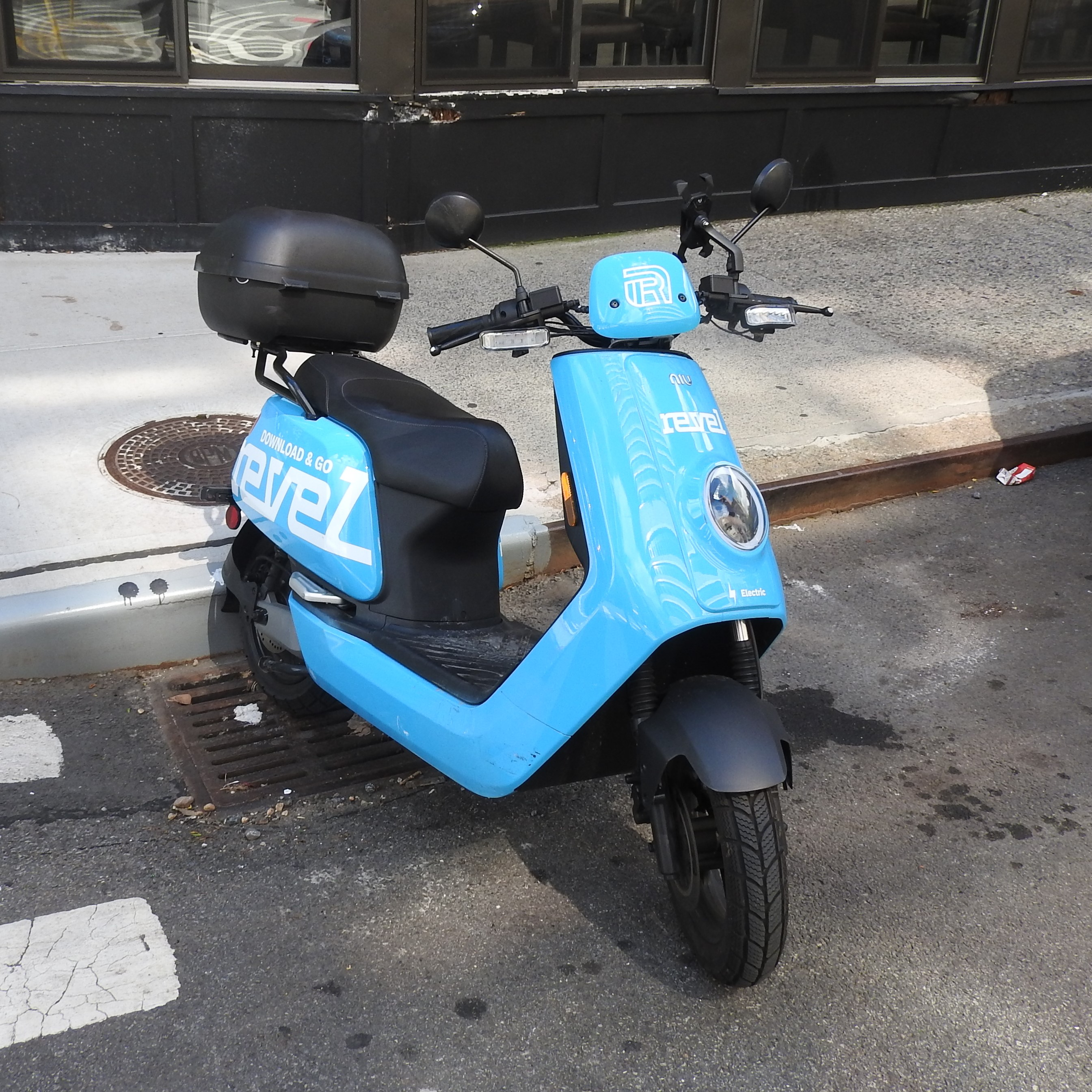
- A Revel moped
- Type: Private
- Founded: 2018; 8 years ago
- Founder: Frank Reig; Paul Suhey
- Key people: Frank Reig (CEO); Paul Suhey (COO)
- Website: gorevel.com

Revel is an electric vehicle rideshare platform based in New York City. The company was founded in 2018 by Frank Reig and Paul Suhey, first starting with a small pilot program of dockless electric mopeds, later growing its fleet size in New York and expanding into Washington, D.C., Miami, and San Francisco. Having pulled out of Washington and Miami in 2022, Revel announced in November 2023 that it would end operation of its mopeds and focus on its electric-vehicle taxi service and its vehicle charging stations.

Revel's vehicles feature a bright blue paint color with a large text reading Revel on the side. Their fleet features Teslas and Kia electric cars.

Revel also offers multiple EV charging stations around New York City.

== History ==
=== 2018-19 ===
Revel was founded in 2018 by Frank Reig who is CEO and Paul Suhey who is COO. In July 2018 it started with a 10-month pilot in the New York City boroughs of Brooklyn and Queens with 68 scooters, eventually replacing them with 1,000 new scooters in the space of one week in May 2019.

On August 16, 2019, Revel expanded to Washington, D.C., with a pilot program of 400 mopeds compared with a total of 5,600 other bikes and scooters from other sharing companies. Their first crash was reported the same weekend.

As of June 2019, Revel had about 40 employees in New York, all full-time with insurance and benefits. In Washington they employed a further 30 employees. The mopeds it used were not owned by the company; rather, outside companies bought the mopeds and leased them to Revel.

=== 2020-24 ===
In July 2020, two Revel moped riders died in accidents in New York City. U.S. Representative Adriano Espaillat wrote to the New York State Department of Motor Vehicles, asking New York City and New York State officials to stop Revel from operating, and Revel suspended its operations in New York City.

In June 2021, Revel opened its first public fast charging hub with 25 chargers in Brooklyn.

In February 2021, Revel expanded its product line by offering monthly electric bike subscriptions to residents of Manhattan, Brooklyn, Queens and the Bronx. As of early April 2021, Revel also operated in Miami, Florida, and in San Francisco, California, after exiting nearby Oakland and Berkeley in 2021.

In July 2021, Revel was granted approval by New York City's Taxi and Limousine Commission to start a taxi service. The city had a ban on new rideshare and taxi offerings, but had an exemption for fully electric vehicles. In August, Revel started with 50 Tesla Model Ys, and by November 2023 operated over 500 electric vehicles in New York and New Jersey.

Revel raised $126 million in funding in 2021 to support the expansion of its all-electric rideshare fleet and to build out additional fast-charging infrastructure in New York City, positioning itself as a vertically integrated electric mobility company combining transportation services with public EV charging.

In November 2023, Revel announced the end of its moped sharing programs, saying it would now focus on its electric taxi service and vehicle charging stations.

As of July 2024, Revel had about 150 total employees. The company is headquartered in South Williamsburg, Brooklyn. Revel has three charging stations in New York City with plans to develop 200 more chargers through 2025, supported by a partnership with Uber.

=== 2020-present ===
On August 11, 2025, Revel announced the end of their rideshare service, saying they will now focus exclusively on vehicle charging stations.

== Vehicles ==
=== Electric vehicle fleet ===
==== Mopeds ====
Revel's mopeds were manufactured by a Chinese company called NIU and cost between $3000 and $5000 retail. These mopeds weigh about 200 lb (91 kg), are powered by two lithium-ion batteries, and have a range of 60 miles (97 km) with a top speed of 30 mph (48 km/h). The batteries were replaced by Revel employees when they need to be recharged. They were equipped with two helmets which Revel said were cleaned every two or three days. All Revel mopeds were registered with the DMV and have license plates.

==== Moped driving requirements ====
Drivers must be 18 or older, have a valid license, and pay a $5 fee for the verification. The company provides a free half-hour rider instructor course but has faced criticisms for its untrained riders and the small number of available lessons compared to the number of new riders. The mopeds are driven and parked on the street, unlike other scooter or bike-sharing companies whose bikes take up space on the sidewalks. Revel does not permit its mopeds for use on major highways and bridges.

== Safety incidents and legal challenges ==
Revel Transit's first personal injury lawsuit came in July 2019 after a driver hit a biker, severely breaking the biker's ankle which required surgery. Police claim the biker pulled in front of the Revel driver who was turning left, causing a collision. The biker's lawyer, however, states that police did not take a statement from his client and it was the Revel driver who collided with the biker as he was attempting a left turn.

The suit claims that Revel is liable for "failure to assure its users ... had sufficient knowledge and skill to operate the moped; failed to ascertain previous experience in operating the moped", noting that the lessons offered by Revel were backlogged.

On August 9, 2019, a Revel rider was hit by a car from a rideshare company. Police say the rider ran a red light, while witnesses say the car was speeding as it passed through the intersection.

The first crash involving a Revel bike in Washington, D.C., occurred on August 18, 2019, the same weekend as their debut. A driver hit a pothole and fell off his moped which landed on top of him, breaking his collarbone. The company responded saying "Safety is our number one priority. This is why we verify riders have a safe driving history as part of our registration process, why we require all riders to use the helmets we provide on each Revel, and why we offer free lessons."

On August 31, 2019, two boys on a Revel in Washington, D.C., moped opened fire on an Uber car, leaving the driver with injuries from the shattered glass.

On July 18, 2020, CBS New York reporter Nina Kapur fell off a Revel moped and was killed in New York City. Less than two weeks later, on July 27, a 32-year-old man named Jeremy Malave was also killed in New York by a traumatic brain injury sustained from a Revel moped crash. Malave was wearing a helmet, but Kapur was not. Following their deaths, Revel suspended operations in New York for one month.
