= Imon Boy =

Spanish graffiti writer

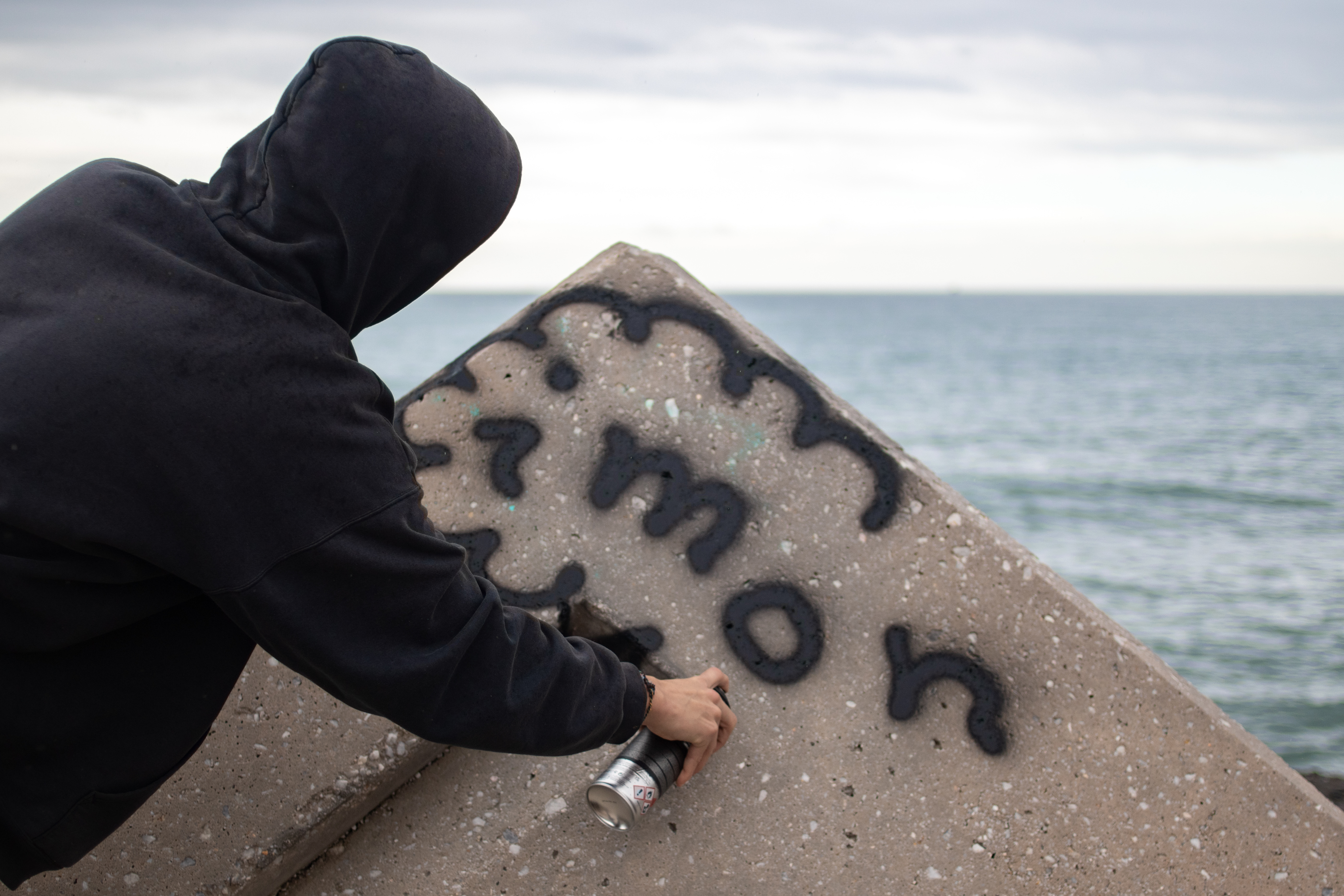
- Imon Boy producing his tag
- Born: 1991 (age 34–35); Málaga, Spain
- Education: University of Málaga
- Known for: Graffiti, street art, fine art

Imon Boy (born in 1991 or 1992) is a Spanish graffiti writer, street artist, and fine artist.

== Career ==
Imon Boy started graffiti at age thirteen before moving on to street art and eventually canvases. His works and frequently make use of internet memes, and make references to video games, movies, police, and nineties culture. Imon Boy's works are often self-referential, discussing his own art and graffiti culture and have been described as conceptual graffiti. His work is often bright and colourful.

=== Solo exhibitions ===
- There is Always a Plan B (2021) Kolly Gallery, Zurich.
- One Day More, One Day Less (2021) Vertical Gallery, Chicago.
- Things Happen (2022) Moosey gallery, London.
- No Regrets (2022) ThinkSpace, Los Angeles.
- We Have It All (2024) Aishonanzuka Gallery, Hong Kong.

Imon's works havebeen exhibited and the Montana gallery and Beyond the Streets exhibitions.

== Personal life ==
Imon Boy chooses to remain anonymous for safety reason. He was born in Málaga, Spain and studied at the University of Málaga. He still tags occasionally, but no longer considers himself a writer.
