= DJ Lady Tribe =

- Born: Nikki Shamdasani; September 16, 1981 (age 45); Hong Kong, China
- Genres: Latin hip-hop, Hip-Hop, Chicano rap, House music, Hyperpop
- Occupations: DJ, graffiti artist, model, actress, reality television star
- Instruments: Turntables, rapping, singing
- Years active: 1995—2020
- Label: Hi-Power Entertainment
- Partner: Roberto Franklin Ramirez (1998—1999)

Nikki Shamdasani, better known by her stage name, DJ Lady Tribe (born September 16, 1981), is a retired DJ, graffiti artist, actress, reality television star and model, of Hispanic, Indian and Japanese descent. She is best known for her graffiti work across the West Coast of the United States, and for her infamous appearance on VH1's hit celebreality series; Rock of Love Bus with Bret Michaels.

== Graffiti career ==
Nikki Shamdasani born September 16, 1981 in Hong Kong. Shamdasani began her graffiti career at the age of 13. In 1995, she was featured in the documentary Graffiti Verité. She quickly became one of the most notable graffiti artists in the California area, she was member of the controversial "TKO" graffiti gang, featuring in their WAR 4, DVD. In 1999, she was arrested alongside her then boyfriend Roberto Franklin Ramirez in Las Vegas, Nevada over two separate suspected gang-related murders. She was arrested again in 2000, for vandalizing public property, for tagging a public bus, after her family home was raided by the Los Angeles Police Department, she served 6 months of jail time.

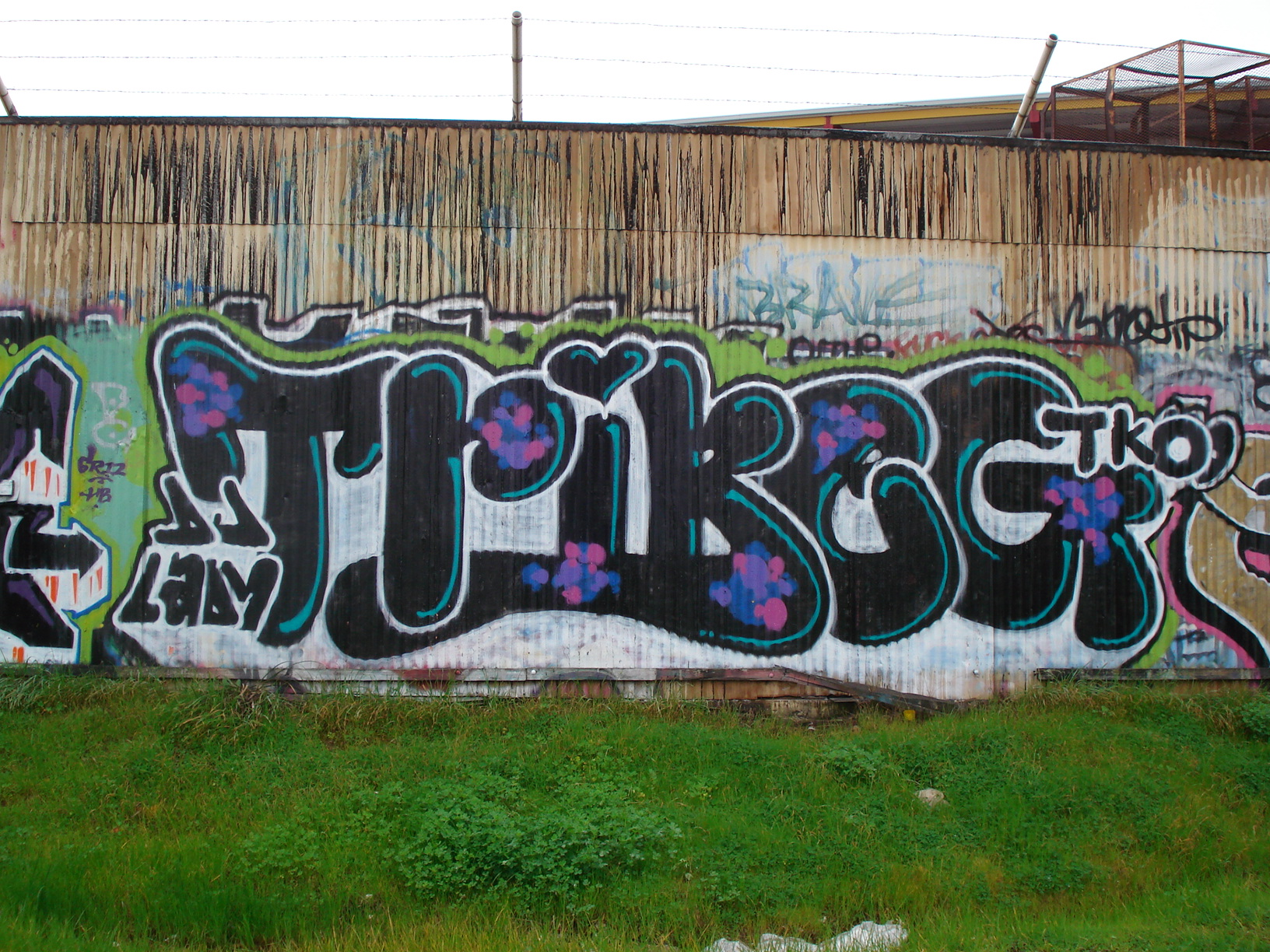
DJ Lady Tribe graffiti tag in Oakland, California.

In 2006, her work was featured in a five minute segment on Fox 11 News, alongside her DJing career. Her work was celebrated in the 2006 book, Graffiti Women - Street Art from Five Continents. Maisto released a limited edition diecast toy range of her work in 2006, which included a DJ Lady Tribe graffiti freight train, a figurine of Shamdasani and a custom convertible car. She had a recurring comic strip in Open Your Eyes magazine, illustrated by artist, Rolo Ledesma, based on her graffiti career. In 2007, she was one of the highlighted graffiti artists in the independent documentary film, Bomb It. She was the cover model of the documentary. Her work eventually caught the eye of graffiti artist, Seen, who is regarded as one of the worlds most famous graffiti artists of all time, they collaborated on a piece together in 2008.

== DJ career ==
Shamdasani began DJing in the early 2000s, after she was gifted a set of turntables. In 2001, she was officially recognized as a member of the "Murda' Mami's" group, a collective of underground female DJ's and rap artists, including; DJ Diamond Kuts, DJ Lady K, Gloria Velez, La La, Ms. Sancha, Rah Digga, Remy Ma, Shawnna, among various others. The group received a shout out on Jadakiss' 2001, single featuring Pharrell Williams, Knock Yourself Out. Shamdasani's notoriety in the Hollywood club scene lead her to working alongside many artists such as; Chingy, Ciara, DJ Khaled, Dr. Dre, Lil Jon, Nina Sky, Pitbull, Redman, Rihanna, Slim Thug, T.I., The Game, Timbaland and Warren G. Between the years of 2004-2007, alongside Pitbull, she co-headlined the DUB Celebrity Carshow tour, Hot Import Nights tour and the Pepsi Street Motion tour. Her performance at the DUB Celebrity Carshow tour, was released to DVD. She was one of the featured DJs for the 2008, Playboy Mansion Halloween and Kandyland events. She also made various appearances on DJ based television shows and had cameo roles in several films.

In 2004, she released her debut single titled Murder Mommy, which was featured on the Cholo Super Mix CD, which she was the cover model for and provided the albums introduction, the single was also featured on the Hi-Power 2005, CD. In 2005, she co-produced Knowa Lazarus' album; How The Q-West Was One, and was the featured artist on his single, Higga Hey. In 2011, she collaborated with Pitbull on a Bojangles remix, which was set for her planned debut EP. She released a second single in 2011, titled Extreme Ways, which featured Twista. She released a third and final single in 2011, titled 24/7, featuring Ms. Sancha. This was a cover of Shamdasani's friend and Sancha's sister, Adore Delano's song, which was originally released in 2009. Tribe’s version of the song was covered by hyperpop artist, Ayesha Erotica, in 2017 for her web series, Loose Teens.

== Modeling career ==
Shamdasani began modeling as her name began growing in the L.A scene, she posed for Bench Warmer, trading cards in the 2004-2006 trading sets. She was on the cover of multiple different magazines including; Access, D Sport, FIXE, Lowrider, LUX G, RIX, Smooth and various others, including featuring on the cover of numerous magazines based in Japan. She was also featured in centerfold spreads for KING and Open Your Eyes magazines. Open Your Eyes magazine, had a recurring comic strip on Shamdasani based around her career.

In 2005, she began appearing on local TV stations as a model, including appearing on an episode of KTLA alongside Playboy Playmate, Carmella DeCesare and glamour models, Carmen Garcia, Flor Bermudez, Jessica Burciaga and Pam Rodriguez, modeling 1950s inspired lingerie. She appeared in music videos for, 50 Cent, Jane's Addiction, Miss Lady Pinks, Mobb Deep and RZA.

Her likeness was used in the iconic 2004, video game; Grand Theft Auto: San Andreas, and later remastered in the 2021, enhanced rerelease of the game.

== Television career ==
Shamdasani appeared in many graffiti based documentaries beginning in the 1995, documentary Graffiti Verité. She was also a featured artist in the 2007, independent documentary film Bomb It, and in the 2009 TKO gang DVD, WAR 4. She was a regular on the 2004, DJ based show, The Drop. Between the years of 2005-2006, she was the entertainment correspondent on LATV's, L.A Onda' TV, interviewing celebrities and reviewing cars. In 2006, she had a guest appearance on the DJ based show, The Roof and had a five minute feature on Fox 11 News, focusing on her DJ and graffiti career.

She had cameo roles in the films; Fast & Furious 4 as a DJ, S.W.A.T and Training Day.

In 2009, she was a contestant on the hit VH1 celebreality series; Rock of Love Bus with Bret Michaels. Despite being eliminated in the first episode, her time on the show became infamous, stemming from an array of different scenes. Including a controversial moment where Shamdasani took a shot of alcohol out of fellow contestant Gia Lynn's, vagina, after Lynn inserted the shot in to herself at a bar. She also famously read out a rap she'd written for Bret Michaels, off the back of a genital herpes and gonorrhea results sheet. She later claimed to take no illegal drugs, and that every drug she took was legal, before hiccupping and apologizing for being too drunk, later during the elimination ceremony, she couldn't stand straight, eventually stumbling down and having to sit on the floor. During the reunion special, she revealed she had entered rehab and had become sober.

In 2010, she was the resident DJ for the, Cholo Comedy Slam: Stand Up and Lean Back, special. In 2013, a never before seen TV reel was uploaded to YouTube for an MTV reality show based around Shamdasani's life.

== Filmography ==
Television
Year	Title	Role	Notes
1995	Graffiti Verité	Herself; feature	Documentary
1998	Graffiti Verité Vol.2: Freedom of ExpreSSion?	Herself; feature	Documentary
2004	The Drop	Herself; DJ	Recurring role
2005-2006	LA Onda' TV	Herself; correspondent	Recurring role
2005	KTLA	Herself; model	1 episode
2005	Mujer Today	Herself; model	1 episode
2005	America's Hottest Female DJs	Herself; feature	Television special
2005	LA X-Large	Herself; DJ	1 episode
2005	OYETV	Herself; DJ	1 episode
2006	The Roof	Herself; DJ	1 episode
2006	FOX 11 News	Herself; feature	1 episode
2006	Hip Hop Honeyz: Blazin' Asians	Herself; co-host	Direct to DVD
2006	Dazza's Latina Bikini Car Wash	Herself; DJ	Direct to DVD
2007	Bomb It	Herself; feature	Documentary
2008	Playboy TV	Herself; DJ	1 episode
2008	World of Playboy	Herself; DJ	1 episode
2009	Rock of Love Bus with Bret Michaels	Herself; contestant	23rd place, 2 episodes
2009	The Soup	Herself; archived footage	1 episode
2009	People's Choice Awards 2009	Herself; audience member	Television special
2009	WAR 4	Herself; feature	Documentary, direct to DVD
2010	Cholo Comedy Slam: Stand Up and Lean Back	Herself; DJ	Television special
2017	Ayesha's Corner	Herself; archived footage	3 episodes, web series

Film
Year	Title	Role	Notes
2001	Training Day	House party guest	Uncredited
2003	S.W.A.T	Background extra	Uncredited
2003	Party Animals	DJ	Short film
2006	YaDaDa	Herself; cameo	Short film
2006	King of Hollywood	DJ	Short film
2007	Hustle The Hard Way	DJ	Direct to DVD
2009	Fast & Furious 4	DJ	
2009	Primos	Model	Short film
2011	Platinum Illusions	DJ	

Music videos
Year	Title	Artist	Role
1998	Domestic Violence	RZA featuring. Jamie Sommers, Ms. Roxy and Tiffany	Nurse #2
1999	Quiet Storm	Mobb Deep featuring. Lil' Kim	Club goer
2003	In Da' Club	50 Cent	Club goer
2003	True Nature	Jane's Addiction	Rioter
2004	Super B-Boy Pimpin'	Earthquake Institute	DJ
2008	Higga Hey	Knowa Lazarus featuring. DJ Lady Tribe	DJ
2010	Chicano Hall of Shame	Miss Lady Pinks	Lowrider passenger

Video games
Year	Title	Role	Notes
2004	Grand Theft Auto: San Andreas	Art work model	
2021	Grand Theft Auto: San Andreas Remastered	Art work model	Previous work remastered

== Discography ==
Year	Title	Notes
2004	Murder Mommy	Debut single
2004	DJ Lady Tribe Intro	
2005	Higga Hey	featured artist
2011	Bojangles (Remix)	featuring. Pitbull
2011	Extreme Ways	featuring. Twista
2011	24/7	featuring. Ms. Sancha
2011	KEEP IT LIVE MA' (Tribe's Theme Song)	
