= Roger Gastman =

American curator, filmmaker, and publisher

- Born: 1977 (age 48–49); Canton, Ohio, U.S.
- Occupations: Art dealer; curator; filmmaker publisher
- Years active: 1997–present
- Known for: Art In The Streets, Beyond The Streets, graffiti and street art

Roger Gastman (born 1977 in Canton, Ohio) is an American art dealer, curator, filmmaker, and publisher who focuses on graffiti and street art.

== Career ==
In 1997, Gastman began his career in graffiti culture by selling aerosol paint tips and creating the graffiti magazine While You Were Sleeping. In 2004, Gastman moved to Los Angeles and published Swindle Magazine with Shepard Fairey. He has worked with a number of prominent graffiti and street artists including Banksy, Barry McGee, Os Gemeos, Shepard Fairey, and Mister Cartoon.

In 2013, Gastman produced The Legend of Cool "Disco" Dan, a documentary film that premiered at the AFI Theater in Silver Spring, Maryland accompanied by the book Pump Me Up: DC Subculture of the 1980s and an exhibit of the same name at the Corcoran Gallery of Art.

In 2021 he directed Rolling Like Thunder, a documentary film about freight train graffiti produced by Mass Appeal and released on Showtime.

=== Art In The Streets ===
In 2011 Gastman, with MOCA director Jeffrey Dietch and director Aaron Rose, curated a survey of graffiti and street art at the Museum of Contemporary Art Los Angeles titled Art in the Streets. The exhibition featured a wide-range of mediums in separate installations by artists or 'crews' and was held in the 40,00 square foot Geffen building, off-site from MOCA. It included over 60 artists from around the world.

The show generated controversy according to the Los Angeles Times "mostly because some see it as a glorification of vandalism". The LAPD reported an increase in vandalism in the vicinity on buildings, lampposts and mailboxes. Katsu tagged the Geffen building before the opening with a fire-extinguisher and French street artist Invader was arrested as a result of the show. A second showing of the exhibit scheduled for later in 2011 at the Brooklyn Museum was cancelled. The show is also noteworthy for being the most attended in the history of MOCA.

=== Beyond The Streets ===
Gastman is the curator and producer of Beyond The Streets, a traveling large-scale exhibition of street art and graffiti. The first Beyond the Streets exhibition was held in 2018 in downtown Los Angeles, CA, which spanned over 40,000 square feet and featured over 100 artists.

The 2019 Beyond the Streets exhibition was held in Brooklyn, New York, showcasing the work of over 150 artists in 100,000 square feet. Beyond the Streets on Paper exhibited at the Southampton Arts Center in 2021.

During the Covid-19 pandemic, Gastman partnered with NTWRK to present Beyond the Streets Virtual Art Fair in 2020 and 2021.

Beyond the Streets began publishing books in 2018, producing artist monographs such as those of Jason REVOK, fine art hardcovers like Beastie Boys Paul's Boutique, Spray Nation by Martha Cooper, the limited-edition Praesentia by Felipe Pantone, and Born In The Bronx: A Visual Record of The Early Days of Hip Hop by Joe Conzo, Jr.; as well as zines from the likes of The Perez Bros., Lady Aiko, and Ian Reid, among others.

In 2022, Gastman opened a permanent Beyond The Streets gallery in Los Angeles, California. He also opened Flagship Gallery & Gift Shop next door.

Within Gastman's Control Gallery, Beyond the Streets partnered with Goldenvoice in presenting EXHIBIT in 2022, called "the most comprehensive exhibition ever on the Beastie Boys."

In 2023, Gastman curated the Beyond the Streets London exhibit at the Saatchi Gallery, running from Feb. 17 through May 9. The event featured 150 artists, covering the entirety of 70,000 square feet of the gallery.

== Films ==
- Rolling Like Thunder, a documentary about freight train graffiti, directed by Roger Gastman, produced by Sacha Jenkins, Tim Conlon, and Mass Appeal, 2021
- Wall Writers: Graffiti in Its Innocence, a documentary film about 60s and 70s-era graffiti, narrated by John Waters, Director / Executive Producer, 2015
- The Legend of Cool "Disco" Dan, narrated by Henry Rollins, Executive Producer, 2012
- Exit Through the Gift Shop, produced by Banksy, Consulting Producer, 2010
- Infamy, with director Doug Pray, Supervising Producer, 2005

== Selected exhibitions ==
- Beyond the Streets London, London, UK, 2023
- Beyond the Streets on Paper, Southampton, NY, 2021
- Beyond the Streets, Brooklyn, NY, 2019
- Beastie Boys Book 'Live & Direct' tour and exhibit, New York, Los Angeles, San Francisco, London, 2018
- Beyond the Streets, Los Angeles, 2018
- Things That Can't Be Seen, DabsMyla, Los Angeles, 2018
- Hello Kitty Con, MOCA, Los Angeles, 2014
- Cruel Summer, Jonathon Levine Gallery, New York 2014
- Pump Me Up: D.C. Subculture of the 1980's, Corcoran Gallery of Art, Washington D.C., 2013
- Art in the Streets, MOCA, Los Angeles, 2011

== Selected bibliography ==
- Gastman, Roger; Banks, Alec; Mensa, Vic; Warwick, Richard, Compliments of: Chicago Gang Culture, 2023
- Beastie Boys, Beastie Boys: Stuff: Volumes 1 - 5, 2022
- Gastman, Roger and Martha Cooper, Spray Nation, Beyond the Streets, 2022.
- Gastman, Roger (Compiler). With Ryan Bray, Ian Sattler, Trina Calderón, 9:30: A Time and a Place: The First 35 Years, R. Rock Enterprises, 2016, ISBN 9780692587300
- Gastman, Roger (Compiler). With foreword by Barry McGee. Wall Writers: Graffiti in Its Innocence, Gingko Press, 2015
- Gastman, Roger and Bob Gorman (Compilers). Let There Be Gwar (2015), Gingko Press, 2015
- Gastman, Roger. With Iley Brown, Caleb Neelon, Joseph Pattisall (Compilers) Pump Me Up: DC Subculture of the 1980s, Corcoran Gallery of Art, 2013
- Fulcher, Zio. Roger Gastman, Jamie Rivadeneira (Compilers), Hello Kitty: Hello Art. Works of Art Inspired by Sanrio Characters, Abrams, 2012
- Gastman, Roger. The Worst of While You Were Sleeping by Gastman, Schiffer Books, 2012
- Gastman, Roger, Jeffrey Deitch, and Aaron Rose (Compilers). Art in the Streets, Skira Rizzoli/MOCA, 2011
- Gastman, Roger and Caleb Neelon, with foreword by TAKI 183, The History of American Graffiti, HarperCollins, 2010. ISBN 978-0061698781
- Gastman, Roger (Compiler). Juxtapoz Illustration; Juxtapoz Tattoo; Juxtapoz Poster Art; Juxtapoz Car Culture, Gingko Press, 2008–2009
- Mullen, Brendan. With Roger Gastman, Live at the Masque: Nightmare in Punk Alley, Gingko Press, 2007
- Gastman, Roger, Caleb Neelon and Anthony Smyrski,Street World: Urban Art & Culture From Five Continents, US Edition Abrams, 2007; UK edition Thames & Hudson, Ltd., 2007; Spanish edition, Oceano, 2007; French edition Pyramid, 2007; German edition National Geographic, 2007.
- Gastman, Roger, Darin Rowland and Ian Sattler, Freight Train Graffiti, Abrams, 2006; UK edition Thames & Hudson, 2006
- Gastman, Roger (Compiler). Morning Wood, Gingko Press, 2003
- Gastman, Roger (Compiler) Free Agents: A History of Washington, DC Graffiti, R. Rock Enterprises & Soft Skull Press, 2001

== Magazines ==
- While You Were Sleeping, 1997–2002
- Swindle, 2004–2009
