= Cruel Summer =

Cruel Summer may refer to:

== Film and television ==
- Cruel Summer (2012 film), a short film by American musician Kanye West
- Cruel Summer, a 2015 film starring Sabrina Dickens
- Cruel Summer (2016 film), a film starring actor Danny Miller
- Cruel Summer (TV series), an American TV series on Freeform
- "Cruel Summer" (The Thundermans: Undercover), an episode of the American TV series The Thundermans: Undercover

== Music ==
=== Albums ===
- Cruel Summer (Ace of Base album), 1998
- Cruel Summer (GOOD Music album), featuring artists from the record label of Kanye West
- Cruel Summer, an EP by Bill Wells
- Cruel Summer, an EP by Miss Fortune
- Cruel Summer, a 2020 album by Sunspot Jonz

=== Songs ===
- "Cruel Summer" (Bananarama song), 1983, also covered by musicians including Ace of Base
- "Cruel Summer" (Taylor Swift song), 2023
- "Cruel Summer", by Karen Elson from The Ghost Who Walks, 2010
- "Cruel Summer", by Azar Swan, 2013
- "Cruel Summer", by Black Marble

== Books ==
- Cruel Summer, by Alyson Noël, 2008
- Cruel Summer, by Juno Dawson, 2013
- Cruel Summer, by Kylie Adams, 2006
- Cruel Summer, from the comic book series Criminal, 2019–2020

== Other uses ==
- Cruel Summer, a 2014 exhibition by Roger Gastman and Tim Conlon
