= Fact (UK magazine) =

Music magazine

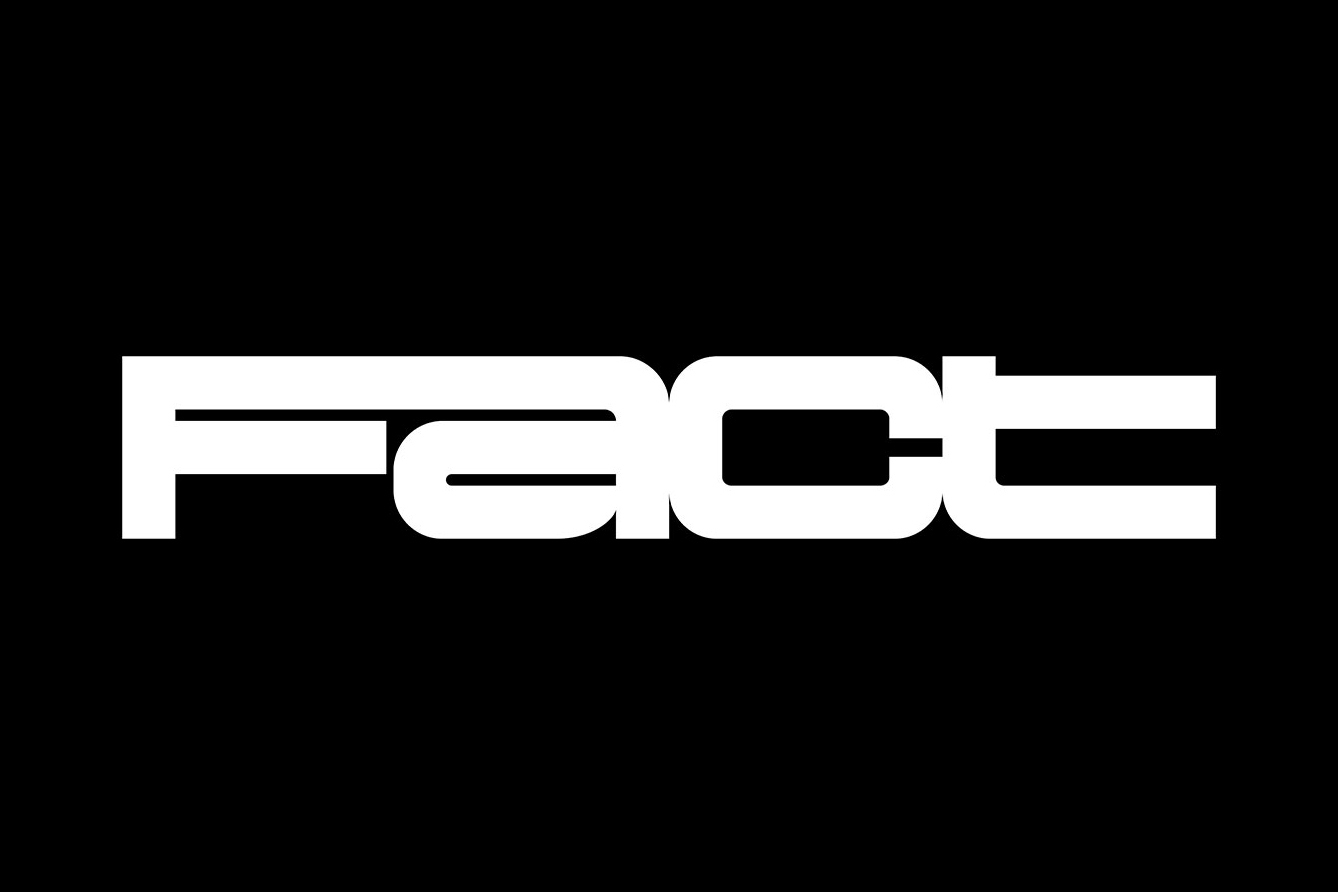
- Editor: David Tapley
- Categories: Music magazine
- Publisher: 180 Studios
- Founded: 2003; 23 years ago
- Company: The Vinyl Factory
- Country: United Kingdom
- Language: English
- Website: factmag.com

Fact is a music publication that launched in the UK in 2003. It covers UK, US, and international music and youth culture topics, with particular focus on electronic, pop, rap, and experimental artists.

Having started as a bi-monthly print magazine, Fact went digital in 2008, focusing on its website and online TV channel Fact TV, which produces documentaries and videos including the series Against the Clock. In November 2020 it returned to publishing a bi-annual print magazine.

Fact produces weekly Fact Mixes. It previously produced the Singles Club review series, and Make Music, aimed at inspiring producers and bedroom musicians.

Fact operates out of a London office, with additional full-time staff in Los Angeles and New York City. It is part of The Vinyl Factory group.

== History ==
Fact was founded in 2003 as a print magazine. It commissioned covers by artists including M.I.A., Bat for Lashes, Shepard Fairey, Barry McGee, Peter Saville, Trevor Jackson, Klaxons, and Brazil's Os Gemeos. It reached a peak circulation of 28,000 (25,000 UK and 3,000 overseas) and readership of 100,000+ per issue, having been available free from independent record stores, clothing outlets, and music/arts venues in the UK, France, Germany, Belgium, Spain, and Japan.

In 2007, some controversy was caused when Dr Martens placed an advertisement in Fact featuring manipulated photographs of a number of dead rock musicians so that they appeared to be wearing the company's boots in heaven. When some of these musicians' families saw the advert, they reacted, leading Dr Martens to dismiss their advertising agency Saatchi & Saatchi.

In 2008, it discontinued the print edition, becoming exclusively an online magazine. In November 2020, Fact resumed producing a large format bi-annual print magazine, with editions in Autumn/Winter 2020, Fall/Winter 2021, and Spring/Summer 2022.

== Recognition ==
Fact was named "music website of the year" by The New Yorker in 2007 and has been described as "one of the UK's best leftfield music sites" by The Guardian.
