= Beyond the Streets =

Street art gallery in Los Angeles, US

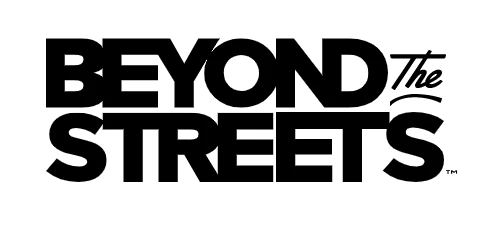
- Status: active
- Genre: exhibition
- Frequency: yearly
- Country: USA, UK, China
- Years active: 8
- Inaugurated: 6 May 2018
- Founder: Roger Gastman
- Participants: <100
- Attendance: 100,000 - 220,000
- People: Martha Cooper
- Sponsors: Adidas Skateboarding, Discover Los Angeles, Modernica, Montana Colors, NPR, and the Steel Partners Foundation
- Website: beyondthestreets.com

Beyond the Streets is a graffiti and street art exhibition and gallery created and curated by Roger Gastman. The first exhibition was held in 2018 in Los Angeles, USA and has since occurred yearly. In 2022, a permanent gallery and store was opened at the location of the original exhibition in LA.

Photojournalist Martha Cooper has had her work featured at, and is the official photographer of, the exhibition.

== Exhibitions ==
The concept of Beyond the Streets evolved from Gastman's earlier exhibition Art in the Streets, held at the Museum of Contemporary Art Los Angeles in 2011.

=== Beyond the Streets (2018) ===
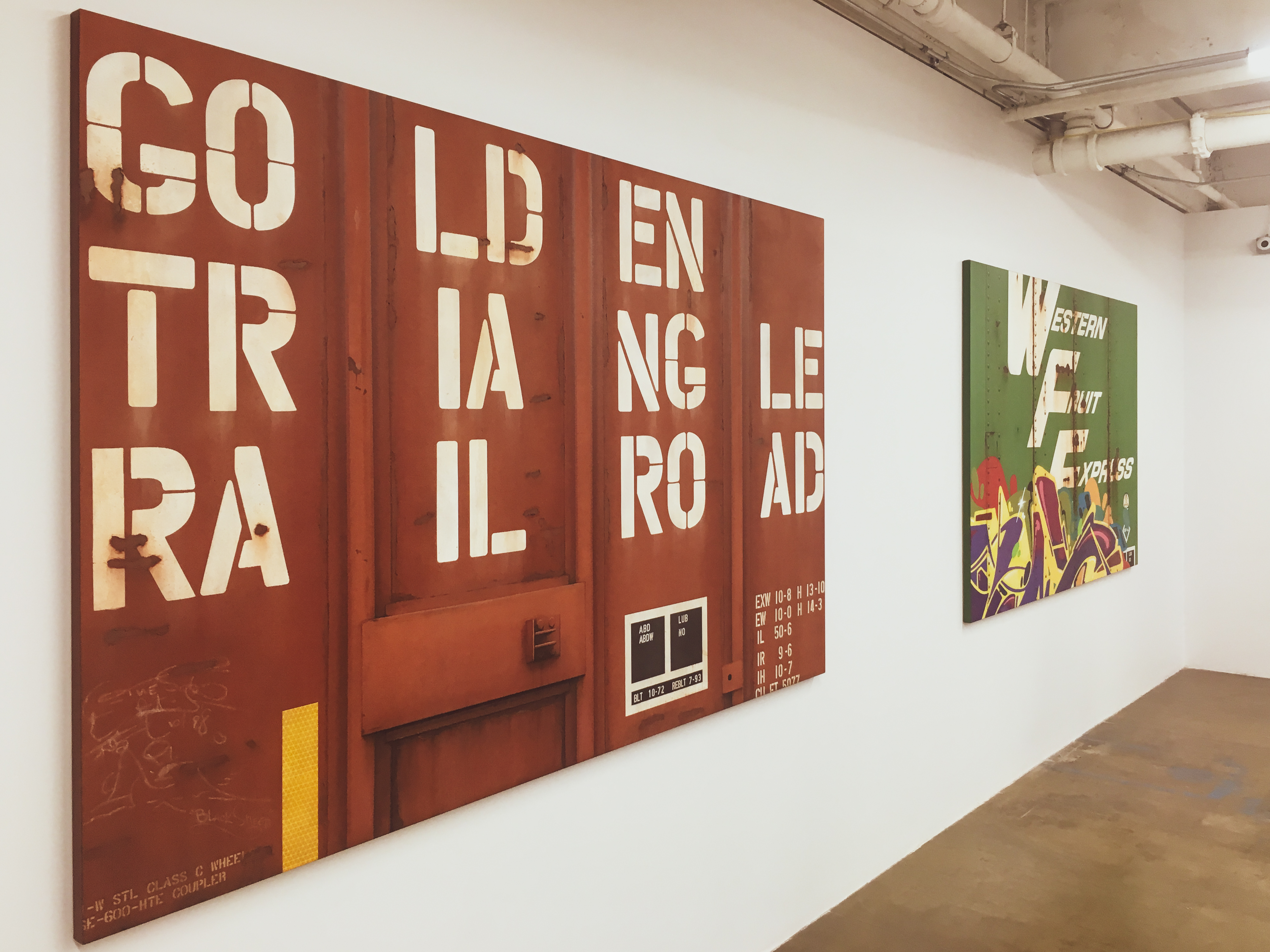
Tim Conlon's artwork on display at the Beyond the Streets exhibition in 2018.

The first Beyond the Streets was in LA from 6 May to 6 July 2018, and featured work by pioneering graffiti writers Cornbread, TAKI 183, and Lady Pink, well-known artist Banksy. Every piece of art on display at the exhibition came directly from the artist, rather than from private collections. Over 60,000 people visited the exhibition.

=== Beyond The Streets New York (2019) ===
The second Beyond the Streets was held in New York City, USA. and celebrated "fifty years of graffiti" and had work from over 150 international artists. It ran for three months from 21 June to 29 September after being extended from its original planned end in August.

=== Virtual Art Fair (2020) ===
Because of the COVID-19 pandemic, the 2020 Beyond the Streets existed as a virtual fair on 5 December with editorial content, drawing sessions with artists, behind-the-scenes museum tours, and an art fair in partnership with NTWRK.

=== Beyond the Streets on Paper (2021) ===
The 2021 exhibition was titled Beyond the Streets on Paper and took place in Southampton, NY, USA from 17 July to 28 August. It featured artists including Felipe Pantone, Guerrilla Girls, Kenny Scharf, Mister Cartoon, Pushead, Shantell Martin, and Shepard Fairey.

=== Beyond the Streets London (2023) ===
In 2023 the exhibition was in London, UK at the Saatchi Gallery. It ran from 17 February to 9 May on the 50th anniversary of hip hop. The exhibition took over the entire 70,000 sqft of the Saatchi Gallery including hallways and staircases. The exhibition made use of traditional galleries with canvases and art in frames, as well as themed rooms such as "Trash Records", a recreated record shop covered in graffiti and posters and a giant lego style alley, and a blacklight neon graffiti room.

The exhibition featured work by over 100 artists including Kenny Scharf, Shepard Fairey, Futura, Lady Pink, Charlie Ahearn, GOLDIE, Guerrilla Girls, Jenny Holzer, Todd James, Paul Insect, Dash Snow, AIKO, Keith Haring, Malcolm McLaren and photography by street art photojournalist Martha Cooper. The UK location meant the exhibition featured artworks by more UK artistis such as Malcolm McLaren and MODE2.

=== Beyond the Streets Shanghai (2023) ===
A second exhibition took place in 2023 in Shanghai, China after originally having been delayed due to COVID-19, but opened on 25 July 2023, and is set to end on 7 October. It was created in partnership with the Perrotin Gallery and is the largest graffiti exhibition in China and the largest Beyond the Streets exhibition so far, taking up 100,000 sqft.

== Gallery ==
The Beyond the Streets gallery opened in 2022. Unlike the exhibitions, the gallery contains works on loan from private collectors. It shares a building with Gastman's Control Gallery, a non-street art gallery that contains "artists who we love that don’t come from graffiti and street art who we would love to work with."

== Collaborations ==
Beyond the Streets has collaborated with Adidas Skateboarding to create clothing, LA-based art charity Paak House to run art programs for foster children, and art brand Montana Colors to create custom paint cans. Discover Los Angeles, Modernica, NPR, and the Steel Partners Foundation have sponsored them.
