= Bomb It =

- DJ Lady Tribe, tagging a wall
- Directed by: Jon Reiss
- Produced by: Tracy Wares; Jon Reiss; Jeffrey Levy-Hinte; Kate Christensen
- Cinematography: Tracy Wares
- Edited by: Alex Marquez; Jessica Hernandez
- Production company: Antidote Films
- Distributed by: Gravitas Ventures
- Release date: April 27, 2007 (Tribeca Film Festival)
- Running time: 94 minutes
- Country: United States
- Language: English

Bomb It is an international graffiti and street art documentary directed by Jon Reiss that premiered at the 2007 Tribeca Film Festival. Filmed on five continents, featuring cities such as New York, Cape Town, London, Paris, Amsterdam, Tokyo, Berlin and São Paulo, Bomb It explores the interplay between worldwide graffiti movements, the global proliferation of "Quality of Life" laws, and the fight for control over public space.

International graffiti artists collaborated with Reiss to create the film which features original footage from many graffiti artists beginning with the first modern graffiti artist Cornbread, to those who saw the take off of the art, TAKI 183 to more contemporary artists Shepard Fairey and Os Gemeos.

In addition to TAKI 183, the film features Tracy 168, Terrible T-Kid 170, Cope2, Stay High 149, KRS-One, Revs, 2esae, Zephyr, Cornbread, DAIM, Blek le Rat, Ash, Revok, Ron English, DJ Lady Tribe, Lady Pink, Mear One, urban theorists Stefano Bloch and Susan A. Phillips, actor and filmmaker Russ Kingston and Faith47.

George L. Kelling, co-author of Broken Windows, an Atlantic Monthly article that formed the basis for Rudy Giuliani's widely imitated gentrification campaign, was interviewed for this film.

== Reception ==
The New York Times wrote, "Bomb It isn't the first documentary to address the history and evolution of graffiti culture, and it probably won't be the last. But what distinguishes Jon Reiss's lively, sure-handed film from the rest is that it widens the spectrum by taking a comprehensively international viewpoint."

== Bomb It 2 ==
The sequel Bomb It 2 (2010) was commissioned as a web series for the digital broadcast network Babelgum and expands the exploration of graffiti and street art into locations not covered in the first film.

Continuing his investigation of international graffiti, Reiss traveled by himself to Bangkok, Jakarta, Singapore, Hong Kong, Tel Aviv, Palestinian refugee camps on the West Bank, Perth, Melbourne, Copenhagen, Chicago and Austin. Artists featured include Klone, KnowHope, GreatBates, Zero Cents, Foma <3, INSPIRE 1, Darbotz, Killer Gerbil, Bon, Alex Face, Sloke, Husk Mit Navn, Ash, Phibs, Stormie Mills, Beejoir and others.
