= DAIM =

German graffiti artist (born 1971)

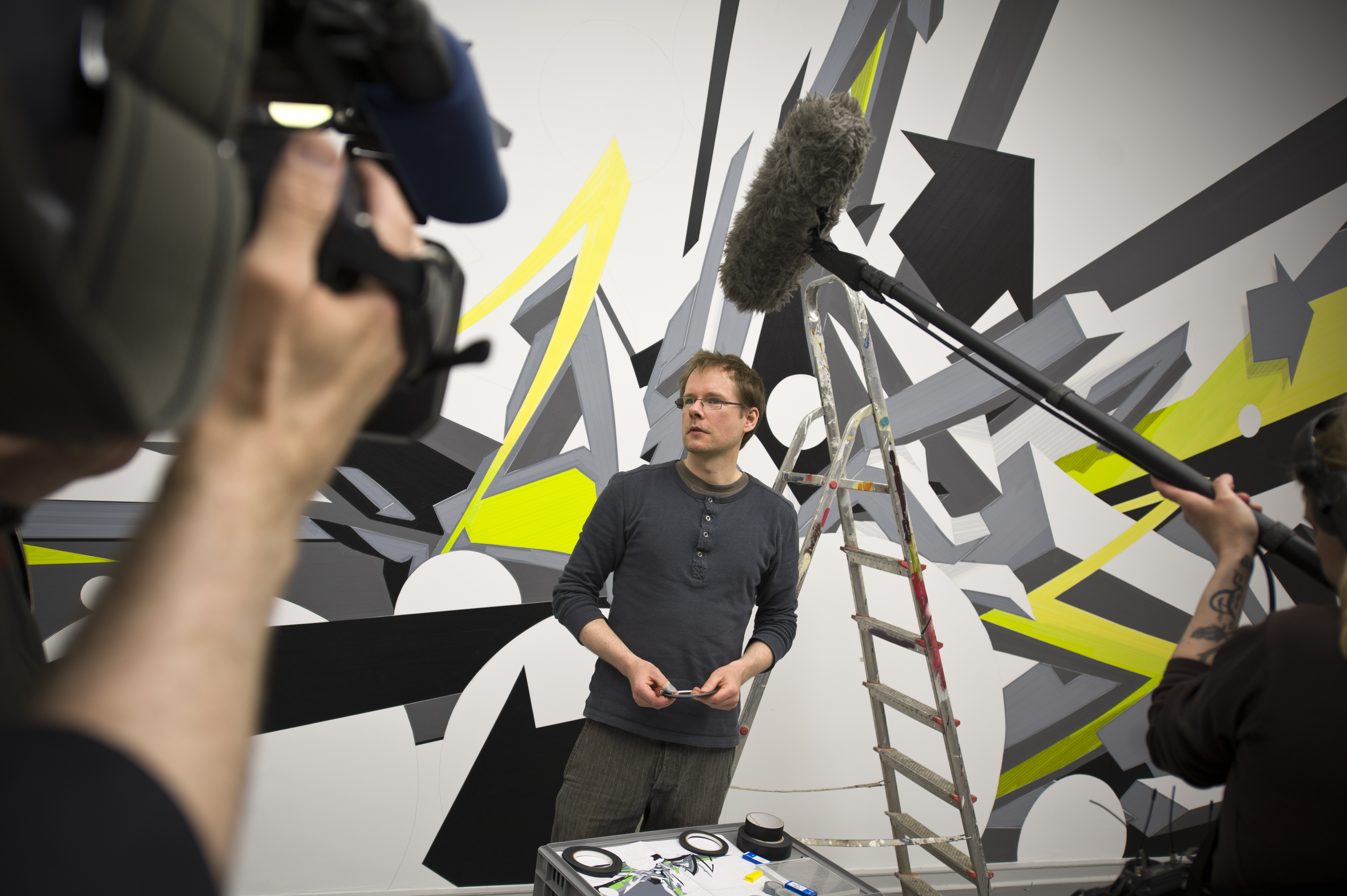
- Reisser in front of his walltaping, 2011
- Born: Mirko Reisser; 1971 (age 54–55); Lüneburg, West Germany
- Education: Lucerne University of Applied Sciences and Arts, Switzerland
- Known for: Public art; graffiti; painting; street art
- Movement: Hip hop culture
- Website: daim.org

DAIM (German pronunciation: [daːiːm], like the coin dime; born 1971 as Mirko Reisser) is a German graffiti artist who lives and works in Hamburg. He is particularly known for his large-size, 3D-style graffiti works. This has become known as his trademark. For his technically sophisticated style he obtained the reputation of being one of the best graffiti artists in the world.

== Works ==
In 1989, Reisser created his first works, still under the name CAZA in those days, which he kept until 1992. He began doing commissioned pieces in 1990. In 1991, right after he graduated from secondary school, Reisser began to work as a freelance artist and renamed himself DAIM. In 1996, he began taking the fine arts program at Lucerne University of Applied Sciences and Arts in Switzerland. In 1999, Reisser founded the studio collaboration getting-up in Hamburg together with artists Gerrit Peters and Heiko Zahlmann. The artist collective has been realizing internationally noticed projects together for more than fifteen years. During his artistic career, Reisser has travelled to many parts of the world and taken part in a multitude of museum and gallery exhibitions. He has also given birth to many art projects, several of them as an initiator and co-organizer.

DAIM has been represented by the gallery ReinkingProjekte in Hamburg, Germany since 2005. As of 2010, he is also represented by the gallery MaxWeberSixFriedrich in Munich, Germany.

=== Style and technique ===
At the beginning of the 1990s, DAIM developed his 3D-style: The artist gained publicity with his trademark of creating the four letters of his name in three-dimensional style. Outlines that are commonly used in graffiti cannot be seen in this style. In fact, by applying light and shadow effects, the colours are placed in such a way that one gets the impression the letters are floating in the air and are tangible. DAIM had been making photorealistic drawings also before his career in graffiti and was influenced by artists like Salvador Dalí and Vincent van Gogh to not place outlines, but rather create forms with shadings and thus present them three-dimensionally.

Reduction is initially the last word that one would attribute to the works of the artist. But, relating to the choice of his motive, this expression is definitely appropriate. Reisser depicts in his works the four letters of his writer's name – DAIM.

"DAIM lets his letters collapse, disrupt, be torn to tatters, yes downright despatter, as if their sight was only possible in a precious millisecond. Then again, it seems the other way round, as if the letter arrangement of hardly obvious, complex structures is in a condition of formation, shortly before being finished to add up to a whole. The programme of DAIM comprises both: the construction and the deconstruction of a word – somewhere in the pulse beat between erasure and remaining it emerges in a synaesthetic sphere, the WORD: It arises from nothing and threatens to vanish there again; but in the moment, in which it constitutes itself, it seems as if it would act independently, free and detached from the burden of content, that it actually should transport..."

— Arne Rautenberg: Pimp My Word. In: Volltext Magazine. No. 4, 2007, pg 6.

The artist succeeds in constructing letters as an architect constructs form:

"By deconstructing typography and lettering, today's tech-savy writers such as JOKER, DELTA and DAIM are in an exciting position. They straddle the deconstructive world of Derrida, who questioned meaning, and that of architects like Lebbeus Woods, Thom Mayne and Zaha Hadid, who question form. The result is a hybrid "typogritecture", where letters are organized, reorganized, and sculpted in three-dimensional space without the surface constraints forced upon writers who rely on the city and street. This isn't to say that writers are no longer dependent on traditional letterforms – they are. By revealing the elemental core of letter formation, artists obsessed with breaking them apart pay reverence to time-tested forms while simultaneously keeping them fresh and lively."

— Ian Lynam: Traveling the Paths of Urban Pioneers. In: Font Magazine. No. 005, 2006, p. 14.

Reisser's works try to put the beholder under a spell and meanwhile, following the creative, dionysian body of thought, search for the transgression of limits. On the contrary, the works are full of clarity, orderliness, and structure. The transgression of limits that is reached through the works becomes a self-discovery and the works ultimately become self-portraits.

"My writings are self portraits"

— Mirko Reisser: DAIM - Creative from time to time. In: Stylefile Magazin. No. 17, March 2005.

Besides using the classic spray can, in 2007 DAIM also began taping his works with adhesive tape, creating sculptures, 3D objects, works on paper, digital works, and giclée fine art prints.

== Early career ==
Reisser was born in Lüneburg. he created his first piece together with Björn Warns – nowadays known as Schiffmeister from the German hip-hop group Fettes Brot – on a feeder pillar behind the yard of his parents' house. DAIM, in those days still working under his writer's name CAZA, sprayed his first, still illegal graffiti works during a time when, after a few arrests in Hamburg, a low phase dominated the scene. Therefore, he knew few other taggers at first and would absorb every trick he could pick up. American influences played a role, especially after a few trips to the US, but the artist's first book about graffiti was Graffiti Live – Die Züge gehören uns. Reisser's style was thus also much influenced by European and German taggers. He was fascinated by the styles of Loomit, Skena, and Zebster, which could be seen in an article about the flea markets of Munich in Stern magazine. During the first two years of his career, he first got to know Hesh and Loomit. Hesh became his partner for several years.

=== Legal issues ===
DAIM did his first wall paintings illegally; he was caught once as a 17-year-old in Hamburg and later in New York City. In 1995, DAIM, Hesh, and New York graffiti artist Per One got caught while spraying on a wall of the basketball court of elementary school 107 in the Bronx. The artists had to face charges for property damage, trespassing, and possession of graffiti material. Possible sentences varied from community service to one year in jail, as reported by the spokesperson of the prosecution, Charisse Campbell. They got released after the hearing, however, as authorization for the installation had been requested by an art teacher in the run-up to the spraying.

=== Crews ===
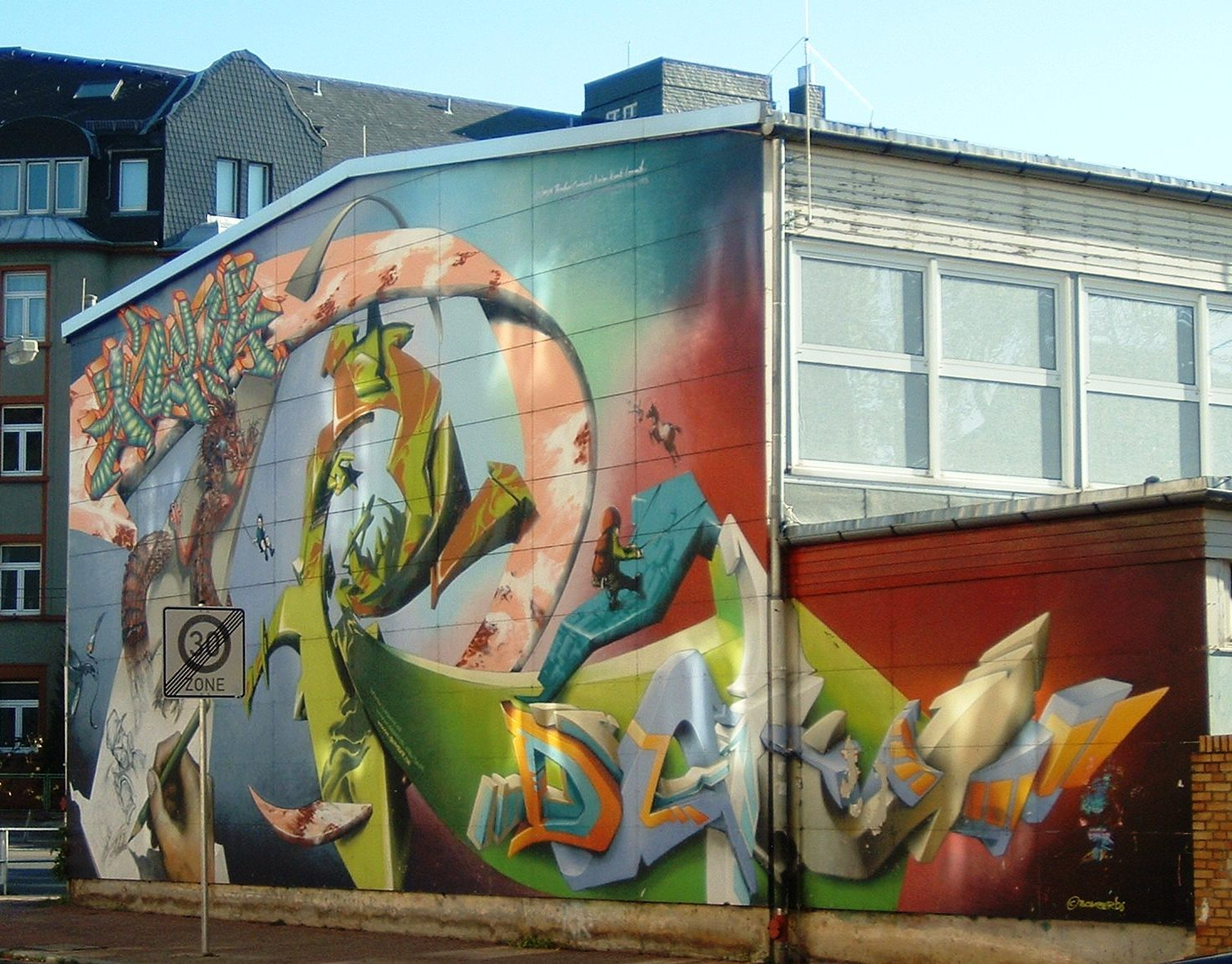
Wall painting by DAIM and other crew members, Frankfurt (Germany), 1998

DAIM is a cofounder of tcd (trash-can design), the first crew that the artist was a part of. One of the most renowned crews that DAIM is a member of is the American FX crew. In 1996, DAIM was invited to New York and was accepted into the crew. He is also a member of fbi (Fabulous Bomb Inability), suk (Stick-Up Kids), es (Evil Sons), and gbf (Gummibärchenfront).

== Projects ==
In 2006, DAIM was one of the artists invited to the sculpture project sculpture@CityNord in Hamburg. One of the curators of this exhibition was Rik Reinking. In 2009, he participated in ARTotale of the Leuphana Universität Lüneburg, where 36 international street artists were invited to the city. Furthermore, DAIM has realised projects for Opel (with Lena Meyer-Landrut) and Volvo (Volvo Art Session 2011 and 2013). He is also one of the initiators of the Urban Discipline exhibitions.

=== Urban Discipline exhibitions ===
The Urban Discipline exhibitions, held from 2000 to 2002 in Hamburg, are among the most important graffiti exhibitions worldwide. In 2000, Mirko Reisser, in cooperation with Gerrit Peters and Heiko Zahlmann, planned and organized the first one of these exhibitions. In an interview, Os Gêmeos, famous twin-brother graffiti artists from Brazil, called it a great project. Urban Discipline had been one of the first and still remains one of the biggest graffiti exhibitions that had ever been arranged. It also helped artists like Daniel Man and Banksy to take the next step in their career. At a time when graffiti was not merely scribbling anymore but also not taken seriously yet, to those organizing the event it was important to establish it as an actual art form. The first exhibition brought international stars of the graffiti scene to Hamburg. The most important representatives of the international graffiti and street art scene returned to Hamburg for the next two years. In 2001, next to Os Gêmeos from Brazil and Martha Cooper from New York, artists from all over Germany as well as Brazil, Austria, France, America, and Switzerland exhibited their works in the Alte Postsortierhalle in Hamburg. In 2002, 34 international artists came together to exhibit in the Astra-Hallen in St. Pauli.

"We've lead the discussion, if graffiti actually is art, very intensely at the latest in 2002 at the Urban Discipline exhibition. This was also a reason to organize this exhibition. We wanted to establish a forum and lead a discussion on the topic, how graffiti changes when canvas is used as a medium for it or when it is exhibited. In the end you can't define this in general. But as a result it was pretty clear – and this has already been my opinion – that graffiti can't be art automatically. [...] Art has to be defined by something different than just by technique."

— Mirko Reisser (DAIM) in: DAIM - der Profi. Backspin Magazin. Nr. 95, July–August 2008, p.5.

=== Tagged in Motion & Nextwall ===
Two other well-known projects by Reisser were developed in cooperation with the agency Jung von Matt/Next: Tagged in Motion and Nextwall. For Nextwall, DAIM and other graffiti artists created a mural. Later interactive elements such as QR Codes and object recognition were inserted, which allowed people to transfer information to mobile devices. Tagged in Motion, meanwhile, was an experiment to connect augmented reality and graffiti. Using 3D-glasses, it was possible for Reisser to spray his works into space and watch them three-dimensionally. The video, posted on YouTube, received over 500,000 clicks within the first few days.

=== Dock-Art ===
For two-and-a-half years, Mirko Reisser and Heiko Zahlmann worked in cooperation with Lothar Knode as artistic directors for the project Dock-Art. The piece, which measured 2,000 m^{2}, was revealed in 2001 vis-à-vis the Landungsbrücken in the Hamburg Harbour at the outside wall of the shipyard's Blohm + Voss Dock 10.

=== Mural Global ===
In the context of Mural Global, a worldwide mural art project for Agenda 21, DAIM realized a 300 m^{2} mural in São Paulo together with Brazilian graffiti artists Os Gêmeos, Vitché, Herbert Baglione, and Nina Pandolfo as well as the German graffiti artists Loomit, Codeak, and Tasek in 2001. The mural is located under a viaduct of the Beneficência-Portuguesa-hospital on Avenida 23 de Maio and comprises the topics of air, earth, water, and fire.

80 murals were created within the scope of Mural Global, an initiative of Farbfieber e.V. Düsseldorf, under the patronage of UNESCO. The project was awarded with the Innovationspreis Soziokultur 2002 of Fonds Soziokultur.

=== Sign of the Times ===
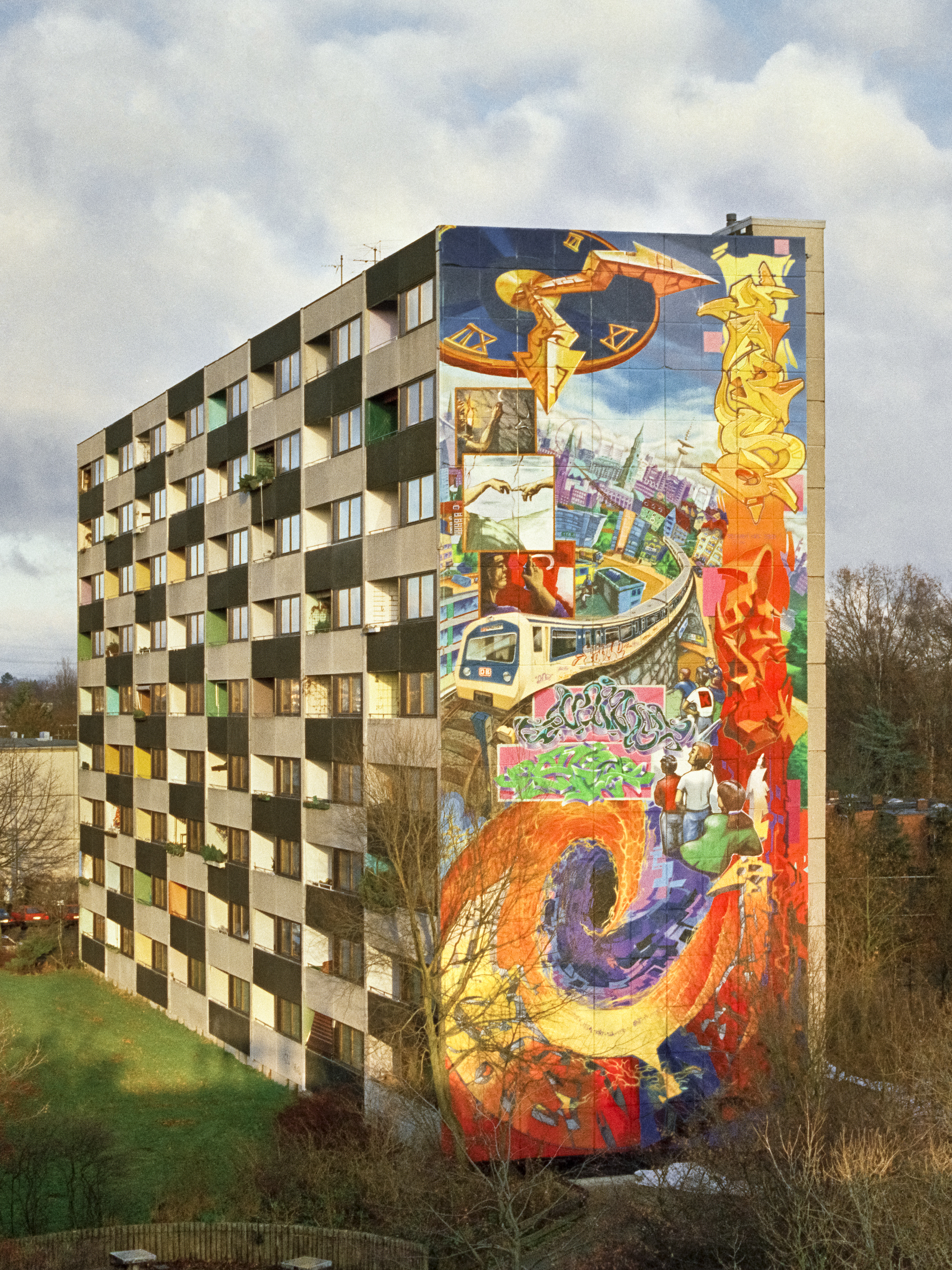
Sign of the times by DAIM, Darco, Loomit, and others in Hamburg-Lohbrügge Germany, 1995

Mirko Reisser also acted as the artistic director for Sign of the Times. The work got an entry in the Guinness World Records for the highest graffiti in the world. Together with Darco, Loomit, and others, and under the organisational lead of Lothar Knode, the piece, with an overall wall-space of 300 m^{2}, was realised on a skyscraper in Hamburg-Lohbrügge in December 1995. The artists working on the 30-meter high and 11-meter wide artwork used 1,000 spray cans. Besides its impressive height, the work also inspired awe with its exciting composition of script and pictorial elements, as well as citations from other art masterpieces.

== Works in collections ==
DAIM is represented in the following art collections (selection):

- Collection Arsenale Novissimo, Venice, Italy.
- Collection MuCEM , Marseille, France.
- Collection ArtFonds21, Frankfurt, Germany.
- Collection Reinking, Hamburg, Germany.
- Collection Klingspor-Museum, Offenbach am Main, Germany.

== Exhibitions (selected) ==
- 2002: getting-up im FREIRAUM, Museum für Kunst und Gewerbe Hamburg, Germany.
- 2003: Young primitives, Groeningemuseum, Brügge, Belgium.
- 2005: Schon vergeben – Sammlung Reinking, Art Cologne, Köln, Germany.
- 2005: Passion of collecting, Collection Federkiel, Collection Reinking, Alte Baumwollspinnerei Halle 14, Leipzig, Germany.
- 2006: Minimal Illusions – Arbeiten mit der Collection Rik Reinking, Villa Merkel, Esslingen, Germany.
- 2007: ID, Kunstverein Buchholz, Buchholz, Germany.
- 2007: tapingDAIM, ReinkingProjekte, Hamburg, Germany.
- 2007: Walls – L'arte al Muro, Fondazione Bevilacqua La Masa, Venice, Italy.
- 2007: Wakin Up Nights, de Pury & Luxembourg, Zurich, Switzerland.
- 2007: Still on and non the wiser, Von der Heydt-Museum, Kunsthalle Barmen, Wuppertal, Germany.
- 2007: Active Constellation, The Brno House of Art, Brno, Czech Republic.
- 2008: fresh air smells funny, Kunsthalle Dominikanerkirche, Osnabrück.
- 2008: Call it what you like! Collection Rik Reinking, KunstCentret Silkeborg Bad, Denmark.
- 2009: Urban-Art – Werke aus der Sammlung Reinking, Weserburg Museum für moderne Kunst, Bremen, Germany.
- 2010: DAIM – coming out, Galerie MaxWeberSixFriedrich, Munich, Germany.
- 2011: Street Art – meanwhile in deepest east anglia, thunderbirds were go..., Von der Heydt-Museum, Kunsthalle Barmen, Wuppertal, Germany.
- 2012: Corner to Corner – Hinz&Kunzt StrassenKunztEdition, Kupferdiebe Galerie, Hamburg, Germany.
- 2013: Abstraction 21 | DAIM&LOKISS, Hélène Bailly Gallery, Paris, France.
- 2013: HANSEstreetartWORKS, MARTa Herford Museum, Herford, Germany.
- 2013: POESIA – Works from the Collection Reinking, Städtische Galerie Delmenhorst, Delmenhorst, Germany.

== Journeys and influence on local scenes ==
In 2001, DAIM travelled to many countries worldwide as part of a graffiti world tour. Among the countries he visited were Brazil, Mexico, Thailand, Australia, and the USA. He has also travelled extensively on other occasions, which has led to international recognition; his works have left lasting impressions on various local scenes.

Although the USA is most commonly known as the cradle of graffiti, American artists have also been influenced by European styles. BG138 from Tats Crew confirmed in an interview that Europe was more advanced in some aspects, among those also being the 3D-style and a cooperative working process – both of which have been shaped by DAIM and Loomit. DAIM has realized works in Los Angeles and Miami, among other cities in the USA. Crome, an artist from Miami, has commented on getting to know DAIM and Loomit and being impressed by how much planning was involved in their working process. In this way, the graffiti could be finished on location at a much faster pace. After meeting these famous European artists, Crome also began to plan his works in advance. He also talked about the insights into proportions that he got from the Europeans. The artist Pest from Miami talks about DAIM and Loomit bringing the first Belton cans there, which changed the colour palette of local artists.

DAIM has also left his mark in Argentina: The Argentinian graffiti scene started to develop at the beginning of the 1990s. A big part of this development happened through the influence of travelling artists. Central figures were the Brazilian twin brothers Os Gêmeos, who are credited with bringing graffiti to Argentina during one of their stays in 1992. Furthermore, local artists were influenced by graffiti they saw on their journeys to Europe and brought back those impressions to their home country. In 2001, DAIM travelled to Buenos Aires. At this time there were a maximum of 20 acknowledged graffiti artists in the city, but with advanced access to the Internet and the launch of the first national graffiti homepage, it was expected that this number would soon rise. DAIM's influence can also be seen in Europe, for example in Switzerland, where Reisser moved for his studies in 1996, as well as in Greece.

== Film ==
- A reporter from 1993's Die Sprayer by the German broadcaster NDR accompanies DAIM together with other artists from Hamburg and examines graffiti as a phenomenon between vandalism and art.
- FX – The Video, a documentary about the FX-Crew directed by Philip Thorne and produced by Abstract Video Inc., Seaford, NY, USA (1998) Run time: 90 min., VHS.
- The movie Urban Discipline – Graffiti-Art Documentation portrays graffiti artists from all over the world whom Mirko Reisser together with getting-up invited to Hamburg in 2002 for the exhibition Urban Discipline. The final DVD of this production has not been published yet.
- The movie Bomb It is one of the most extensive and elaborate documentaries about the graffiti movement. Old and rare original material shows some of the most well-known and best graffiti artists in the world.
- AlterEgo portrays 17 different graffiti artists in nine cities from seven different countries. The protagonists talk about topics including the motivation to use public space for their personal expression and their view on the role of graffiti in the art world.
- The 90-minute documentary Still on and non the wiser, which accompanies the exhibition with the same name in the Kunsthalle Barmen of the Von der Heydt-Museum in Wuppertal draws vivid portraits of the artists by means of personal interviews, and also catches the creation process before the exhibition was opened.
- The movie Alltag von DAIM (The everyday life of DAIM) by Christian Brodack shows the everyday life of the artist and his work during the development of the first charitable StrassenKunztEdition, that Mirko Reisser realized in cooperation with Hinz&Kunzt, Hamburg's magazine for the aid of the homeless.

== Bibliography ==
- Mirko Reisser, R. Reinking, J. Stahl, B. Grace Gardner, A. Rautenberg, Mirko Reiser [DAIM]: 1989-2014, (2014). Drago Publishing. ISBN 978-88-98565-01-6
- Portmann, Pius; Reisser, Mirko (1997). DAIMMATE: Die Entwicklung des Graffiti (in German). Lucerne (Switzerland): Lucerne University of Applied Sciences and Arts.
- DAIM (1999). "Sketches". In Nabi, Adrian (ed.). Backjumps - Sketchbook (in English and German) (3rd ed.). Berlin (Germany): Backjumps. p. 27. ISBN 3-9806846-0-1.
- Reisser, Mirko; Peters, Gerrit; Zahlmann, Heiko, eds. (2000). Urban Discipline 2000: Graffiti-Art. Urban Discipline: Graffiti-Art (in English and German). Vol. 1 (1st ed.). Hamburg (Germany): getting-up. ISBN 3-00-006154-1.
- Reisser, Mirko; Peters, Gerrit; Zahlmann, Heiko, eds. (2001). Urban Discipline 2001: Graffiti-Art. Urban Discipline: Graffiti-Art (in English and German). Vol. 2 (1st ed.). Hamburg (Germany): getting-up. ISBN 3-00-007960-2.
- Reisser, Mirko; Peters, Gerrit; Zahlmann, Heiko, eds. (2002). Urban Discipline 2002: Graffiti-Art. Urban Discipline: Graffiti-Art (in English and German). Vol. 3 (1st ed.). Hamburg (Germany): getting-up. ISBN 3-00-009421-0.
- Reisser, Mirko; Mwinkand, Lena; Behrend, Sarah (2004). DAIM: daring to push the boundaries (in English and German) (1st ed.). Hamburg (Germany): getting-up. ISBN 3-00-014155-3.
