= Pam Rodriguez =

American model

Pam Rodriguez is an American glamour model of Guatemalan and Puerto Rican descent.

== Personal information ==
Rodriguez was born and raised in Los Angeles, California. She is fluent in both Spanish and English.

== Career ==
Rodriguez began modeling in 2003, and appeared on the cover of Open Your Eyes magazine in 2008. She has also appeared in several other publications, including FHM, Lowrider, and Smooth.

In 2009 she launched a swimwear line known as "Pure Rodri."
