= Montana Colors =

Spanish art brand

- Industry: Art materials
- Founded: 1994
- Founder: Jordi Rubio
- Headquarters: Barcelona, Spain
- Area served: Worldwide
- Website: www.montanacolors.com

Montana Colors, also known as MTN, or sometimes Spanish Montana (to distinguish it from German brand Montana Cans), is an art company founded by Jordi Rubio in Barcelona in 1994. The majority of its products are designed for use in graffiti. They are considered to be one of the best spray paint brands in the world.

== Collaborations ==
In a collaboration with Beyond the Streets, MTN have created custom paint cans with artists including Jean-Michel Basquiat, Keith Haring, André, Chor Boogie, Ron English, Mister Cartoon, and Shepard Fairey, as well as brands Carhartt and Casio. In 2016, MTN released a paint named Gris Rita (Rita Grey) in honour of Spanish politician Rita Barberá being "responsible for the disappearance of countless amounts of graffiti."

Montana Colors have sponsored street art festivals in Australia and the USA, most notably Beyond The Streets.

== Relationship with Montana Cans ==
Montana Cans, a German paint brand, began in 1995 after Montana Colors pulled out of a brand deal with German company after they already had the rights to use the name Montana.
