= Darco =

French painter (born 1968)

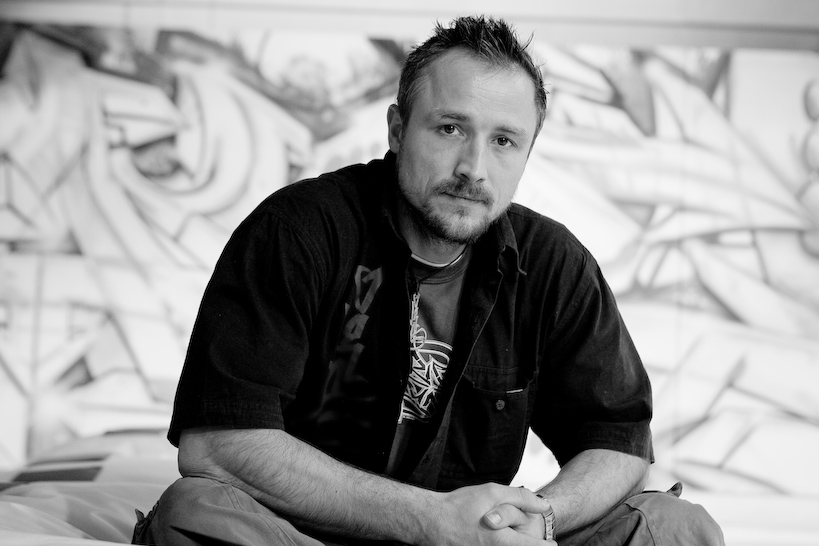
- Portrait of the artist, 2006
- Born: Darco Gellert; 1968 (age 57–58); Bielefeld, West Germany
- Known for: Street art, Graffiti, Murals

Darco (born 1968 as Darco Gellert in Bielefeld, Germany) is a graffiti-artist who lives and works in Paris, France.

Painting in The Bronx, New York 1987, Darco, Zoom, Seen, Loomit

IP5 2" graffiti on wall by Darco, Photographer Jasmin Derome, paris 2010

== Biography ==
Darco was born in 1968 in Germany (Bielefeld) and moved to France in 1976. There, Darco developed an early interest in art and more specifically Graffiti-Writing. Darco painted his first "piece" (painting) in a suburb of Paris in 1984. Since the early 1980s, he has received worldwide recognition for his style of writing, and is credited for influencing generations of graffiti-writers across the globe.

Darco specialises in the art of lettering. Although he retains the graphic side of the outline, his style is often labeled 3D. Originality in style, perspectives and the dynamics of varying forms and colors are the focal point of Darco's work.

In 1985, together with "Gawki", Darco created the writer crew "FBI", now an international artist collective, with members like Loomit, DAIM or Bomber. Through their originality, choice of subject, concept, style, size and quality of their work, coupled with extensive global travel, the crew acquired the respect of graffiti artists and followers the world over.

Darco was the first Graffiti Artist in France to be convicted for damage to public property in the year of '89. As a result, he was made an example of and suffered an extremely harsh punishment. After much deliberation, the SNCF (French Rail) decided, under the influence of different ministries and media, to set a new punishment for the crime. Darco was finally asked to paint several murals for the train company in order to work off the fine. A few years later in 1994, Darco was invited to be involved in the renovation of Europe's first train station – Gare du Nord. The result was a mammoth spectacle – the creation of 900 m2 (~ 9700 ft2) of murals in one of the world's busiest stations.

Since 1992 Darco has held the title of being one of Europe's first Graffiti-Writers to have acquired the official status of 'artist'. He is also a member of the American crew UA and the Australian crew TFC. Alongside artistic research, Darco works in several areas of the artistic industry, including decoration, design, fashion, set and stage design, and as an Art Director, adviser and consultant. He also regularly works within Europe, South Africa, USA, Australia and Canada.

In 2006 a book called, "Darco Code Art" was published by "Editions Alternatives / L' oeil d' Horus".

In the past Darco has worked as the artistic adviser of Jean Jacques Beineix, the body double of Olivier Martinez in the film IP5: L'île aux pachydermes and has sketched a complete concept for DJ Vadim's album "The Art of Listening".

Darco's work has been exhibited in the museums Palais de Tokyo, Centre Georges Pompidou, Kaltmann Museum, Musée des Arts et Traditions Populaires, and the Grand Palais in Paris, France. Darco continues to work to this day.

== Exhibitions ==
- 2000: Collective exhibition, Urban Discipline 2000 et réalisation d'une fresque collective – Hamburg (Germany)
- 2000: Area 101 – Adelaide (Australia)
- 2000: Collective exhibition, Totem – Perth (Australia)
- 2002: Art director of a 200m2 wall for Groundwork Morden – London (GB)
- 2003: Mural at Palais de Tokyo for the autumn festival opening – Paris (France)
- 2006: Solo show, Wooden Shadow Gallery – Melbourne (Australia)
- 2007: Solo show, Melt Gallery – Sydney (Australia)
- 2007: Solo Show, Carhartt Gallery – Weil am Rhein (Germany)
- 2007: Galerie Onega – 60 rue Mazarine – Paris (France)
- 2008: Solo show, galerie Bailly Contemporain (Paris) – curator Taxie Gallery.
- 2008: Collective exhibition, galerie Bailly Contemporain (Paris) – curator Taxie Gallery.
- 2009: TAG, collective exhibition at le Grand Palais, Paris, 2009.
- 2009: Exhibition in l'hotel Kube with le Studio 55
- 2013: Solo show, OZM Artspace Gallery - Hamburg (Germany)

== Books ==
- Chalfant, Henry & Prigoff, James: Spraycan Art.
- Florent Massot R. Pillement: Paris tonkar. (1991) ISBN 2-908382-09-1.
- Paris, art libre dans la ville. Herscher (1991) ISBN 2-7335-0195-X.
- Bernhard van Treeck: Graffiti Lexikon. Edition Aragon (1993) ISBN 3-924690-88-X.
- Scum, Cheech H, Techno 169: Theorie des Styles: Die Befreiung des Alphabets. 1. Print, Style Only Workgroup, Munich (Germany) (1996).
- Backjumps – Sketch book. (1996).
- Graffiti Art #9 – Graffiti auf wänden und maueren. Schwarzkopf & Schwarzkopf (1998) ISBN 3-89602-161-3.
- Graffiti Art #11 – Graffiti in Paris. Schwarzkopf & Schwarzkopf ISBN 3-89602-343-8.
- Graffiti Art #3 Writing in München. Schwarzkopf & Schwarzkopf ISBN 3-89602-045-5.
- Graffiti Art Deutschland-Germany. Schwarzkopf & Schwarzkopf ISBN 3-929139-58-8.
- Du Tag au Tag. Epi/DDB (2000).
- Kapital. Alternatives (2000) ISBN 2-86227-257-4.
- Reisser, Mirko; Peters, Gerrit; Zahlmann, Heiko, eds. (2000). Urban Discipline 2000: Graffiti-Art. Urban Discipline: Graffiti-Art (in English and German). Vol. 1 (1st ed.). Hamburg (Germany): getting-up. p. 74. ISBN 3-00-006154-1.
- Broken Windows Graffiti NYC. Gingko Press, inc (2002) ISBN 1-58423-078-9
- Reisser, Mirko; Mwinkand, Lena; Behrend, Sarah (2004). DAIM: daring to push the boundaries (in English and German) (1st ed.). Hamburg (Germany): getting-up. p. 34. ISBN 3-00-014155-3.
- Woshe: Blackbook. (2005) ISBN 2-86227-461-5.
- Gellert, Darco: Darco Code Art. Wasted Talent (2006) ISBN 2-86227-475-5 (Monography).
- Mural Art. Carpé Diem (2008) ISBN 978-3-939566-22-9
- Cristian Campos: 1000 grafitis y obras de arte urbano. Maomao publications (2010) ISBN 978-84-96805-71-2
