= Swindle (magazine) =

US magazine

- Cover of Swindle №15 2007, featuring artwork by Strawberry Switchblade
- Senior Creative Director: Shepard Fairey
- Editor-In-Chief: Roger Gastman
- Frequency: Quarterly
- Format: A4
- Publisher: Shepard Fairey
- Founder: Shepard Fairey
- Founded: 2004
- Final issue: 2009

Swindle was a bi-monthly arts and culture publication founded in 2004 by artist Shepard Fairey. The magazine has not been published since 2009.

The magazine had a strong focus on street art and has featured Banksy, Invader, Faile, and Miss Van on its cover. Swindle has featured interviews with celebrities such as Billy Idol, Debbie Harry, and Grandmaster Flash. In 2006 and 2007, Swindle compiled annual Icons issues that featured 50 leading art and culture figures.

Shepard Fairey's Studio Number-One produced the magazine until early 2009. Art direction for the magazine was done by Smyrski Creative. In addition to its regular staff, Swindle had contributors from the music, fashion, and creative industries, including Fairey, Banksy, Henry Rollins, Caroline Ryder, Clint Catalyst, Day19, Shawna Kenney, and Damien Hirst.

In 2006, Advertising Age picked Swindle's issue 8 as one of the "10 Magazine Covers We Loved." The L.A. Weekly listed Swindle's creators among the "L.A. People of 2006."

== Issues ==
This list is incomplete

Number	Date	Cover
1	2004	Obey Giant Art, Grandmaster Flash
2		Northern Ireland - Newry
3		Invader
4		(Drummer)
5		Billy Idol, Steve Jones
6	2007	REVOK Modeling bootleg fashion
7		Jim Houser, Israeli Hip Hop, Prohibition, Reality TV, Brooklynites
8		The Naked Truth, Banksy
9		Miss Van and Disco Demolition, SKA, Screenprinting
10	2007	Henry Rollins, Candy Wrapper Museum
11		Matt Leines, Fly Gemini
12		Faile, The Ferus Gallery, Ghana Turns 50, Detroit Hardcode, Subculture
13		Germs, Death & Fame
14		Master Class, TWIST, Dalek, BLU, Liverpool Music.
15	2008	Anarchy
16		London (Woman in Burkha)
17		Chris Stain, Amanda Visell Roy Ferdinand, Gary Baseman
18	2008	
19		Mike Giant, Furries, Gang Graffiti, Mac & Cheese, Apache Skateboards
First Annual Icons	2006	Twiggy, Hulk Hogan, Yoko Ono, Slash, Chuck D
Second Annual Icons	2007	Debbie Harry
Third Annual Icons Issue	2008	Paul Rubens, Anthony Bourdain
