= Cornbread (graffiti artist) =

American graffiti artist

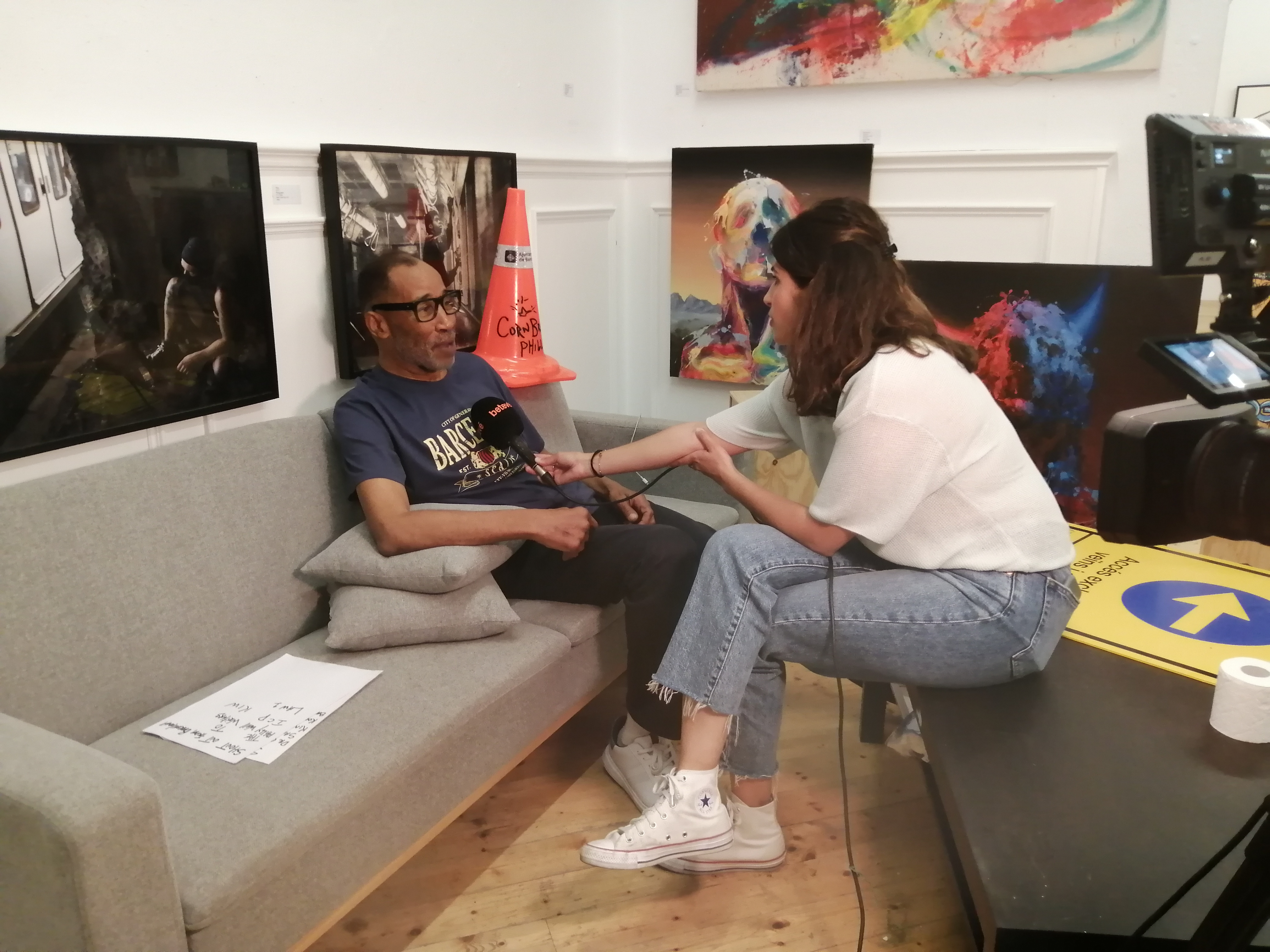
- Cornbread in an interview with Betevé in Barcelona, 2022
- Born: Darryl McCray; 1953 (age 72–73); Brewerytown, Philadelphia
- Education: Strawberry Mansion High School
- Known for: First modern graffiti artist
- Notable work: Cornbread Lives
- Style: Tagging
- Movement: Graffiti
- Spouse: Consuela Sanchez
- Partner: Cynthia Custuss

Darryl McCray (born 1953), better known by his tagging name Cornbread, is an American graffiti writer from Philadelphia. He is widely considered the world's first modern graffiti artist. In this regard, he pioneered the "tagging" element of hip-hop culture. McCray was raised in Brewerytown, a neighborhood of North Philadelphia. During the late 1960s, he and a group of friends started doing graffiti in Philadelphia, by writing their monikers on walls across the city. Independently to Philadelphia, the graffiti movement was evolving in New York City and blossomed into the modern graffiti movement, which reached its peak in the U.S. in the late 1970s and early 1980s, and then spread to Europe. McCray later worked with the Philadelphia's Anti-Graffiti Network and Mural Arts Program to help combat the spread of graffiti in the city. He is currently a public speaker and a youth advocate.

== Childhood and corrections facility ==
Born in Brewerytown, Philadelphia in 1953, McCray was primarily raised by his mother and grandparents. In 1965, he was sent to a juvenile corrections facility called the Youth Development Center (YDC). While at the YDC, McCray adopted the nickname "Cornbread". He complained to the cook of the institution, Mr. Swanson, that he only baked white bread, while McCray preferred his grandmother's cornbread. His constant badgering inspired Swanson to start calling McCray "Cornbread", a nickname that McCray adopted.

The YDC was full of Philadelphia gang members who would write their names on the walls of the facility. McCray claims he was never part of a gang, but he would write his new nickname, Cornbread, on the walls next to the gang members. He claimed to be the first person to tag his own name and not a gang name or symbol.

== Tagging in the 1960s and 1970s ==
When McCray was released from the YDC, he went to Strawberry Mansion Junior High School. There, he developed a crush on a girl named Cynthia Custuss. To win her attention, he wrote "Cornbread Loves Cynthia" all over North Philadelphia. After winning her over, he continued tagging North Philadelphia.

In 1971, Cornelius Hosey was shot dead in gang warfare, and Philadelphia newspapers incorrectly identified him as Cornbread. In response to this misidentification, Cornbread decided to tag an elephant named Konna in the Philadelphia zoo to attract media attention.

== The Anti-Graffiti Network and Mural Arts ==
In 1984, Mayor Wilson Goode founded the Anti-Graffiti Network and recruited McCray to help him stop inner-city youth from tagging. The Anti-Graffiti Network eventually turned into the Mural Arts Program, the largest public art program in the United States.

In 2011, a local mural tour in West Philadelphia called Love Letters drew its inspiration from 1967's "Cornbread Loves Cynthia".

== Activist and icon ==
In 2007, documentary filmmaker Sean McKnight made a film called Cry of the City Part 1: The Legend of Cornbread. The story of Cornbread is also prominently included in a documentary film about the history of graffiti, Bomb It (2007). In August 2013, McCray was honored at the Graffiti Hall of Fame in East Harlem for his contribution to hip-hop culture.

== Personal life ==
Today, McCray works as a public speaker and youth advocate. He gives motivational talks about his youth as a tagger, his run-ins with the law, and his struggles with drugs.

In 2021, he married Consuela Sanchez, a longtime friend from Philadelphia.
