= Lady Aiko =

Japanese street artist

- Born: Aiko Nakagawa; 1975 (age 50–51); Tokyo
- Education: New School University
- Known for: Street art
- Notable work: Exit Through the Gift Shop, Here's Fun for Everyone
- Website: ladyaiko.com

Aiko Nakagawa (born 1975), known as Lady Aiko or AIKO, is a Japanese street artist based in Brooklyn, New York. She is known for her ability to combine western art movements and eastern technical, artistic skills, as well as for her large-scale works installed in cities including Rome, Italy, Shanghai, China and Brooklyn, New York.

Aiko's work is inspired by 18th-century Japanese woodblock printing and has been described as "joyfully, subversively feminine." Her artwork on canvas uses a bricolage technique, incorporating spray paint, stenciling, brushwork, collage, and serigraphs. She is inspired by New York neighborhoods and advertising, drawing from imagery from Chinatown and Times Square in the form of old signs, billboards, and neon signs. Aiko is heavily inspired by her Japanese identity, and experiences as a Japanese woman. Through her graffiti and street art, she gives visibility and representation to women and girls, as well as addressing gender inequality and other issues they may face in the world. Aiko enjoys creating art that is beautiful, full of love, and can be shared with anyone. The imagery in her work is often linked to romance, sexuality, and promiscuity while also appreciating and praising the female form. Aiko fully embraces the process of creating her work, and thrives off of the freedom, spontaneity, and challenges that come with using the street as your canvas and gallery space. The focus on process is seen in her work through the prominent layering of colors and stenciled shapes, reminiscent of screen printing or wood block prints that come together to create her large female figures.

== Biography ==
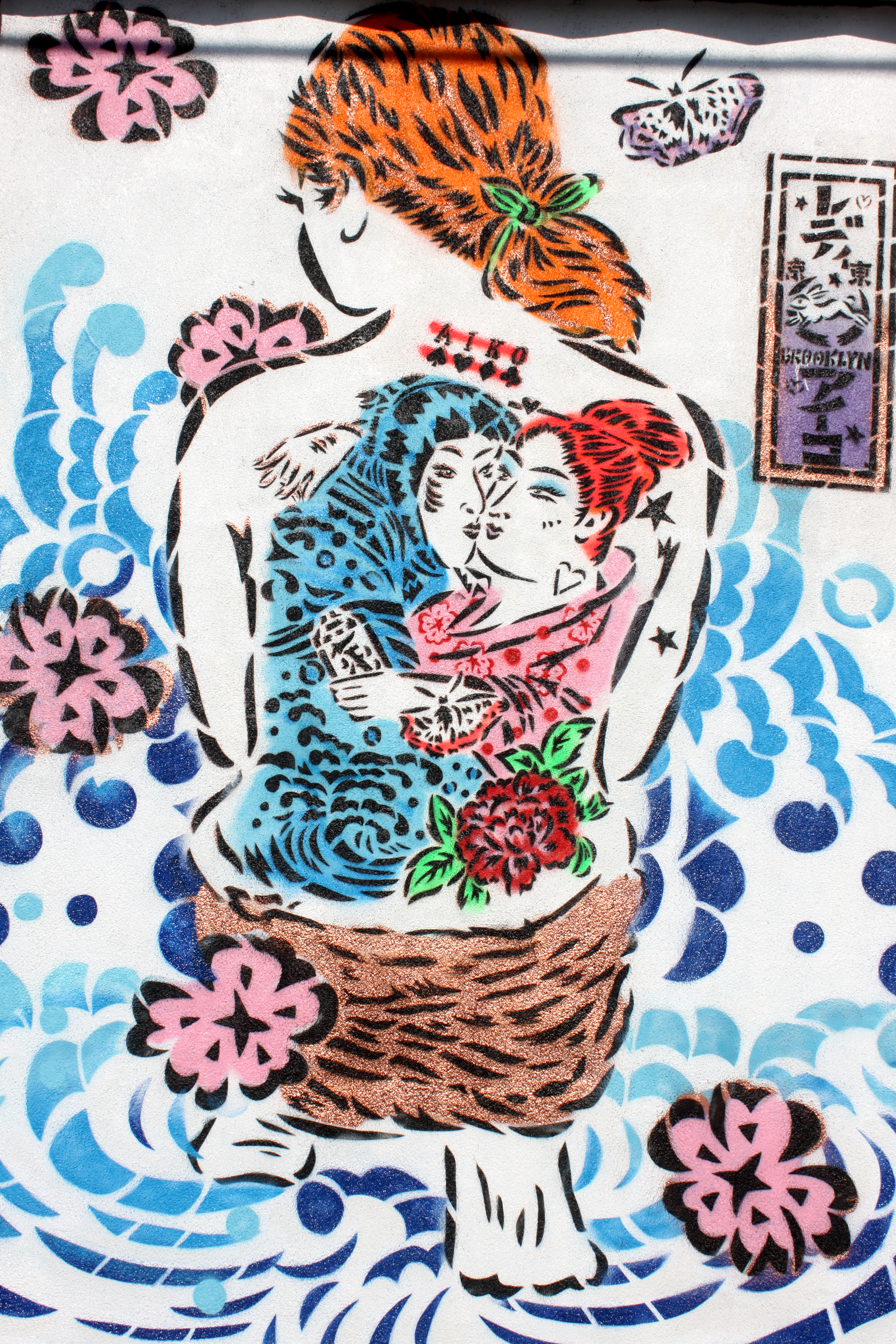
Street art in spray paint by Aiko Nakagawa (AIKO)

Aiko Nakagawa was born in 1975 and raised in the central area of Tokyo. She attended an all-girl high school. While she was in college in Tokyo, she created a pirate television station that broadcast her own music videos and short films. The broadcast could be picked up within a three-kilometer radius and generated some local press coverage before the government sent her a letter ordering her to desist. In the mid-1990s, she moved to New York City where she apprenticed in artist Takashi Murakami's Brooklyn studio. Her and Muramaki's work are similar by their incorporation of Japanese culture, and have even worked with high-end fashion designer, Louis Vuitton. She studied media studies at the New School University and wheat pasted naked images of herself around the city.

Towards the end of the 1990s Aiko collaborated with artists Patrick McNeil and Patrick Miller. The three formed the street art collective FAILE (then A-life) in 1998. Together the artists created "large format, monochromatic, screen-printed female nudes," among other work. They collective became very popular through this style which worked similarly across media from posters, to prints, to gallery works on canvas. In 2006, Lady Aiko left the collective.

In 2005 she collaborated with fellow street artist Banksy for his film Exit Through the Gift Shop.

Aiko' s work was included in the Museum of Sex's erotic street art exhibition in 2012. Later that year she created the mural Here's Fun for Everyone on New York City's Bowery Wall. She was the first woman artist to be invited to paint the wall.

In 2013, she attended the international street art festival Nuart in Stavanger, Norway, alongside fellow female graffiti artists Martha Cooper and Faith 47. Working on two walls of a tunnel below the Tou Scene arts centre, she created a work with stenciled representations of silhouettes, women, angels, Mount Fuji, butterflies, flowers and a rabbit holding an aerosol paint can to represent female energy. The same year she designed a characteristic floral and feminine scarf for luxury brand Louis Vuitton alongside other street artists Retna and Os Gemeos.

== Works ==
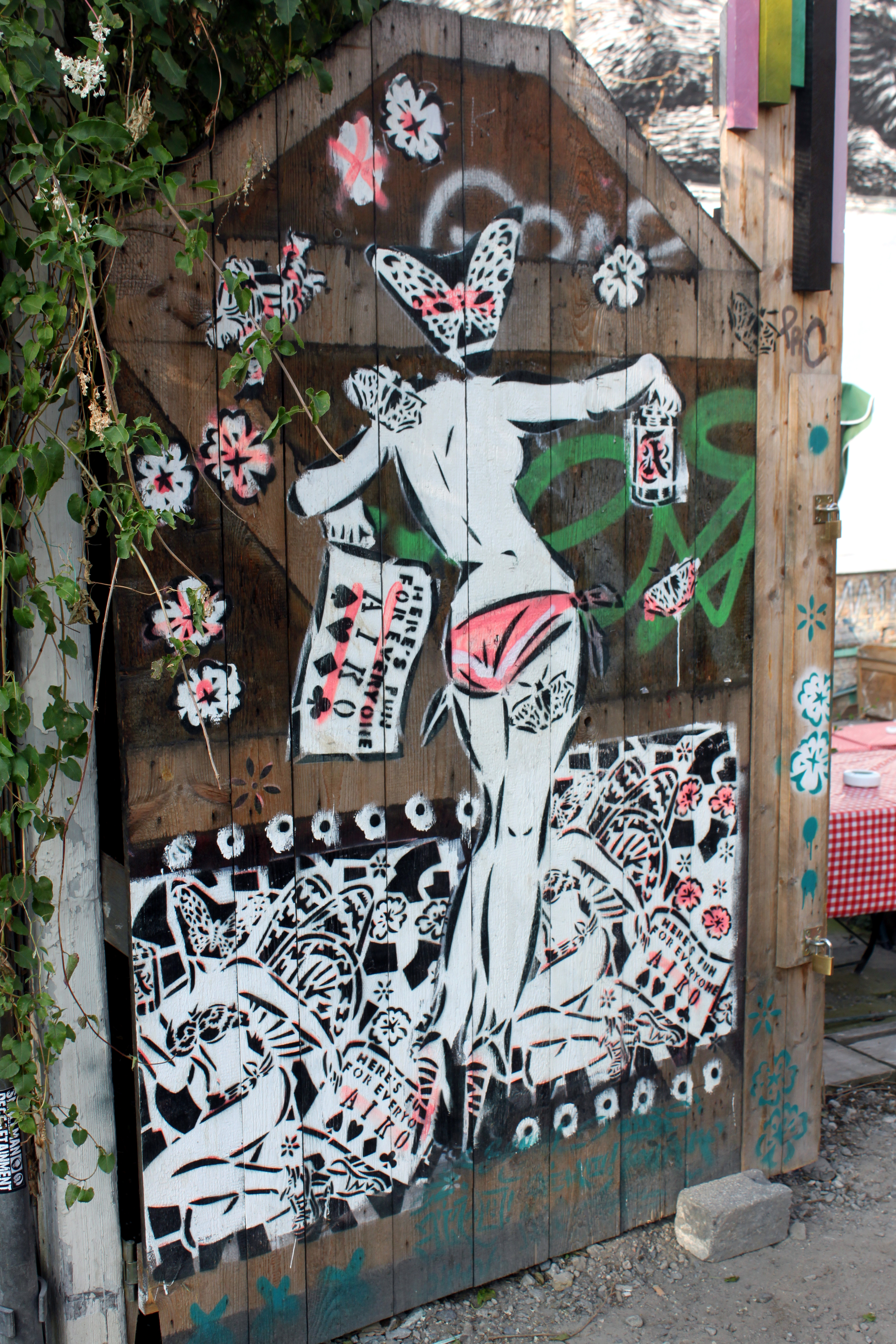
Street Art by Aiko Nakagawa (AIKO), characteristic of her erotic, feminine style

- 2008 Bunny - Kid Robot, Limited Edition Vinyl Figure
- 2008 Lady Kill and Vandarismo, print release with POW, London
- 2008 Shut Up and Look, exhibition at Brooklynite Gallery, Brooklyn, NY
- 2009 Love Monster, exhibition at Joshua Liner Gallery, Chealsea, NY
- 2010 The Standard Stairwell Project at the Standard, NY and Hollywood LA
- 2010 Here's Fun For Everyone, exhibition at Andrew James Art, Shanghai, China
- 2011 Lady Butterfly, limited edition sculpture / black and silver
- 2011 Unstoppable Waves, exhibition at Andenken Gallery, Amsterdam, the Netherlands
- 2011 Unstoppable Waves London, exhibition at PURE EVIL Gallery, London
- 2011 Camouflage Blue
- 2012 After a Long Time, exhibition at Merry Karnowsky Gallery, LA
- 2012 Lady Butterfly, limited edition sculpture / cCherry
- 2012 The Bowery Wall, New York CIty
- 2013 Foulards d’Artistes, AIKO x Louis Vuitton
- 2013 Lady Butterfly, limited edition sculpture / pearl white
- 2014 AIOK x ISETAN, window display project, ISETAN Tokyo
- 2014 AIKO's Bunny Party at Gallery Brooklyn, Brooklyn, NY
- 2014 Sweetheart, at The Outsiders Gallery, Newcastle, UK
- 2015 Lady Butterfly, limited edition sculpture / pink
- 2015 Edo City Girl, at Ink_d Gallery, Brighton, UK
