= Open Your Eyes (magazine) =

American men's magazine

Magazine cover of issue 40 featuring Eva Longoria.

Open Your Eyes (OYE) was an American magazine aimed at Latino men. The magazine was based in Los Angeles. OYE was published from July 1999 until 2011. It offered stories on entertainment, women, sports, cars, relationships, humor, and Latino culture.
