= Tim Conlon (artist) =

American artist and graffiti writer

- Born: October 7, 1974 (age 51); Alexandria, Virginia
- Known for: Graffiti, street art, public art
- Website: timconlon.com

Tim Conlon (born 1974 in Alexandria, Virginia) is an American artist and graffiti writer known for large-scale murals and works on canvas. He was featured as one of several artists (including Kehinde Wiley and poet, Nikki Giovanni) in the Smithsonian National Portrait Gallery exhibit, Recognize! Hip Hop and Contemporary Portraiture, which included four large graffiti murals painted by Conlon and collaborator, David Hupp in 2008. This marked the first modern graffiti ever to be in the Smithsonian Institution.

In 2011, he curated the G scale train exhibit in the Los Angeles Museum of Contemporary Art’s, Art in The Streets survey of graffiti and street art.

In 2020 his work was featured in Sotheby's first ever Hip-Hop Auction. Conlon also produced the 2021 documentary, Rolling Like Thunder, a film about freight train graffiti produced by Mass Appeal and released on Showtime.

His Blank Canvas train paintings are in multiple collections, including the Norfolk Southern Corporation's headquarters in Atlanta, Georgia. Conlon's art can be found on the streets of Washington, D.C., in city-sponsored public art projects. Conlon has exhibited at the Corcoran Gallery of Art, along with shows and projects in New York, Los Angeles, Miami, Chicago, San Francisco, London, Paris, Bordeaux and Berlin.

== Exhibitions ==
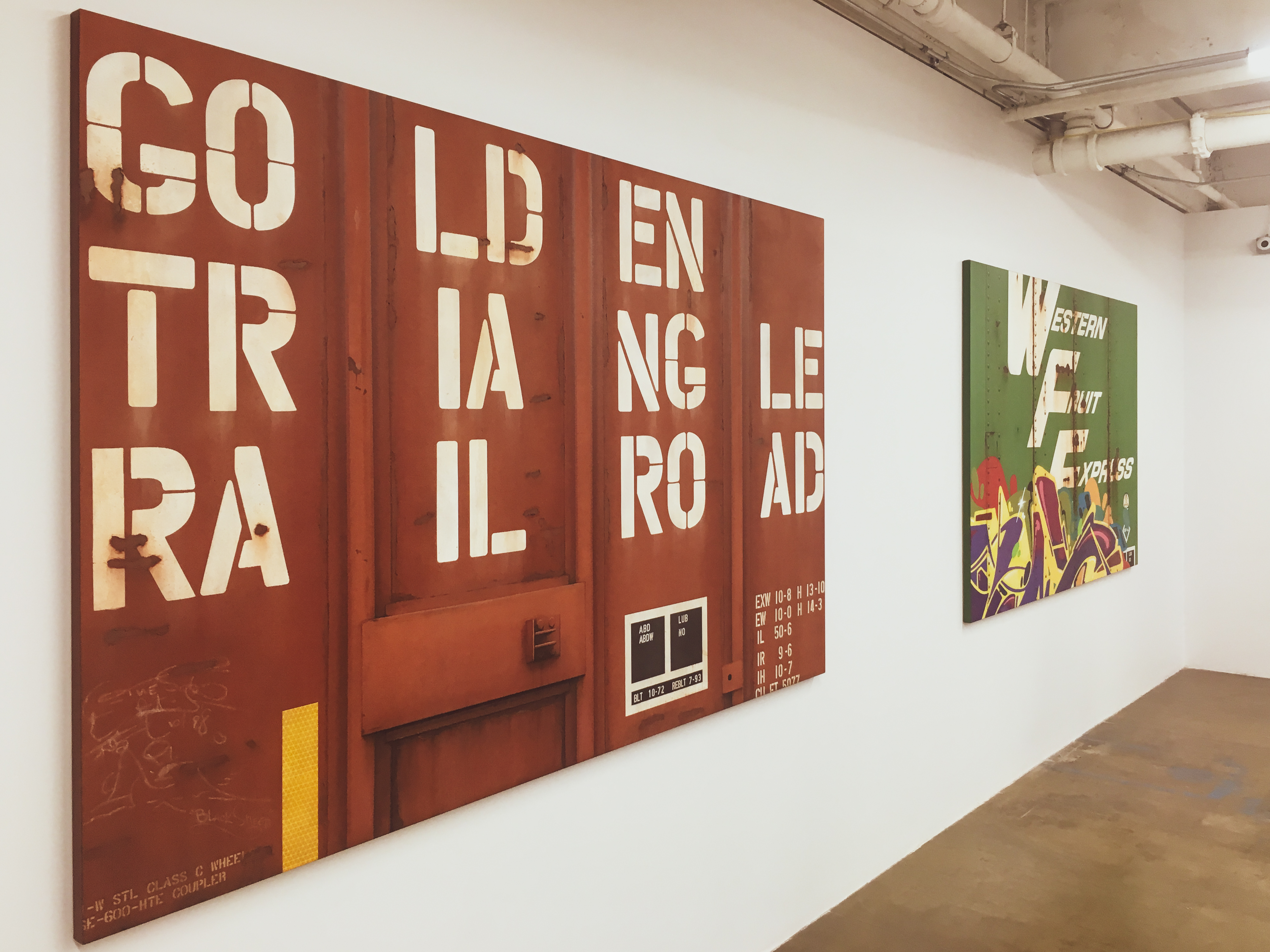
Tim Conlon's artwork on display at the Beyond the Streets exhibition in 2018.

- WE ARE [still] HERE, Petit Palais, Paris, France (Group) 2026
- BEYOND THE STREETS Paris, Grande Halle de la Villette, Paris, France (Group) 2026
- Appointment Only, BEYOND THE STREETS Gallery, Los Angeles, CA (Group) 2025
- BEYOND THE STREETS: Post Graffiti, Southamptons Art Center, Southampton, NY (Group) 2024
- Tracks of Time, Control Gallery, Los Angeles, CA (Solo) 2023
- BEYOND THE STREETS Shanghai, Jingan International Center, Shanghai, China (Group) 2023
- BEYOND THE STREETS London, Saatchi Gallery, London, England (Group) 2023
- Sotheby's Hip Hop Auction, Sotheby's, New York, New York (Group) 2020
- BEYOND THE STREETS NYC, 25 Kent, New York, NY (Group) 2019
- BEYOND THE STREETS, Werkartz, Los Angeles, CA (Group) 2018
- Moniker Art Fair, The Old Truman Building, London, UK (Group) 2017
- Between the Lines, Roman Fine Art, East Hampton, NY 2017
- Cruel Summer, Jonathan LeVine Gallery, New York City (Group) 2014
- Transit, Vertical Gallery, Chicago (Group) 2014
- One Track Mind, The Seventh Letter, Los Angeles 2014
- Pump Me Up: D.C. Subculture of the 1980s, Corcoran Gallery of Art, Washington, DC (Group) 2013
- Art in the Streets, Los Angeles Museum of Contemporary Art (LA MOCA), Los Angeles (Group) 2011
- Sanrio's Small Gift, Miami (Group) 2010
- The Underbelly Project, New York City (Group) 2010
- les grandes Traversées, Cortex Athletico, Bordeaux (Group) 2010
- Black in Black w/Mark Jenkins, The Fridge, Washington, DC (Split) 2010
- Recycled Meaning: Oil and Water, Corcoran Gallery of Art, Washington, DC (Group) 2009
- BOMBS AWAY!, Strychnin Gallery, Berlin (Curator/Group) 2009
- MANIFESTHOPE:DC, The Manifest Hope: DC Gallery, Washington, DC (Group) 2009
- Recognize! Hip Hop and Contemporary Portraiture, Smithsonian National Portrait Gallery, Washington, DC (Group) 2008
- 400ML Project, Maison des Métallos, Paris (Group) 2008

== Bibliography ==
- Gastman, Roger. BEYOND THE STREETS. May 2018. ISBN 978-0692074886
- LTD. Sanrio Company, and Roger Gastman. Hello Kitty, Hello Art! Abrams, October 2012. ISBN 978-1419704536
- Workhorse, PAC, and Haze. We Own the Night: The Art of the Underbelly Project. Rizzoli Books, February 2012. ISBN 978-0789324955
- Deitch, Jeffrey, Roger Gastman, and Aaron Rose. Art in the Streets. Skira Rizzoli, April 2011. ISBN 978-0847836178
- Gastman, Roger and Caleb Neelon. The History of American Graffiti. Harper Design, April 2011. ISBN 978-0061698781
- Boone, Jobyl A., Brandon Fortune, and Frank H. Goodyear, III. RECOGNIZE! Hip Hop and Contemporary Portraiture. Washington, DC: National Portrait Gallery, 2008. ISBN 978-0978665715
- Gastman, Roger, Darin Rowland, and Ian Sattler. Freight Train Graffiti. Harry N. Abrams, June 2006. ISBN 978-0810992498
- Gastman, Roger. Enamelized. R77 Publishing, June 2004. ISBN 978-1584231707
