= Revok =

American graffiti artist

- Born: Jason Williams; 1977 (age 48–49); U.S.
- Movement: Graffiti
- Website: jasonrevok.com

Jason Williams (born 1977), known professionally as Revok, is an American graffiti artist.

== Legal dispute ==
In 2018, Williams issued a cease-and-desist letter to clothing retailer H&M, asserting that the company had used his artwork without permission in a promotional campaign. In response, H&M filed a lawsuit arguing that uncommissioned street art created illegally could not be protected by copyright law. Following public opposition and artist boycotts, H&M withdrew the legal action and settled the dispute with Williams.

== Arrests for vandalism ==
Revok has been arrested multiple times for vandalism related to unauthorized graffiti. Following an initial felony arrest at the Coachella music festival in 2008, he was placed on probation. In 2009, he was arrested at an airport in Australia for 9 counts of vandalism and fined $15,000 AUD after posting about his activities on Twitter and blogs. Again – and in part due to his Twitter account – in November 2009, he was arrested in Los Angeles outside of a graffiti shop during the 'Art in The Streets' exhibition.

In April 2011 he was arrested at Los Angeles International Airport (LAX) while attempting to board a flight to Ireland for an outstanding warrant. His bail was set at $320,000—setting a record for a vandalism charge—and he ultimately served 44 days in prison.

== Solo Exhibitions ==
- Tragedy & Triumph, Vicious Gallery, Hamburg, 2011.
- Ordinary Things, Library Street Collective, Detroit, 2012.
- Revok, Ruttkowski;68, Köln, 2015.
- Revok, Library Street Collective, Los Angeles, 2015.
- The Artists Instruments, MOCAD, Detroit, 2022-23.

== Bibliography ==
- Gastman, Roger (2014). Revok: Made in Detroit. Gingko Press. ISBN 978-1-58423-552-1.
- Revok, Jason (2023). Jason REVOK. Gingko Press. ISBN 979-8-21812-756-5.
