= OSGEMEOS =

Brazilian graffiti-artist duo

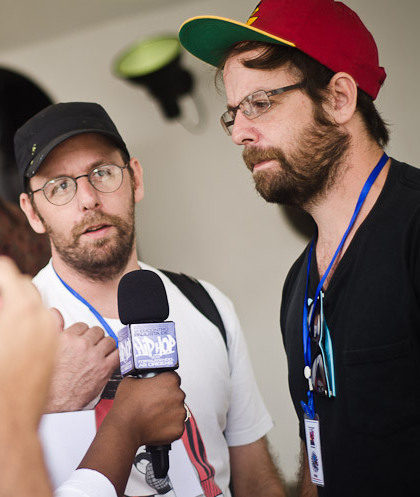
- Otavio and Gustavo Pandolfo (OSGEMEOS) at the 6th São Paulo Meeting of Hip Hop Artists (2012)
- Born: Otavio Pandolfo; Gustavo Pandolfo; 1974 (age 51–52); São Paulo, Brazil
- Known for: Painters, muralists, graffiti
- Movement: Hip hop culture
- Website: www.osgemeos.com.br/en

OSGEMEOS (also known as Os Gemeos or Os Gêmeos, Portuguese for The Twins) are identical twin street artists Otavio Pandolfo and Gustavo Pandolfo (born 1974). They started painting graffiti in 1987 and their work appears on streets and in galleries across the world.

== Style ==
Their work has been described as "escapist fantasies," notable for its dreamy, illustrative, and patterned style. Observers have compared this dream-like aesthetic to the works of Hieronymus Bosch and M. C. Escher.

Their work often features yellow-skinned characters—taken from the yellow tinge both of the twins have in their dreams—but is otherwise diverse and ranges from tags to complicated murals. Subjects range from family portraits to commentary on São Paulo's social and political circumstances, as well as Brazilian folklore. Their graffiti was influenced by both traditional hip hop and Brazilian culture.

== Influences ==
The twins started out as breakdancers and got involved with graffiti later on. Their first graffiti emulated early New York City hip hop pieces. It was some years before they began to put Brazilian cultural elements and influences into their graffiti.

Their first significant artistic influence outside their immediate environment, and their limited access to American hip hop (Style Wars, Subway Art, Beat Street), stemmed from a chance encounter with Barry McGee (also known as Twist), who was in Brazil for several months on a study abroad program through the San Francisco Art Institute in 1993. Technique and experience were shared, and McGee provided photographs of American graffiti. Through McGee, OSGEMEOS met Allen Benedikt (founder of 12oz Prophet Magazine and also part Brazilian), who together with Caleb Neelon (also known as Sonik) was the first to interview them after a trip to Brazil in 1997 (in 12oz Prophet Magazine Issue 6; 1998), which became OSGEMEOS' introduction to audiences outside of South America.

== Notable public works ==
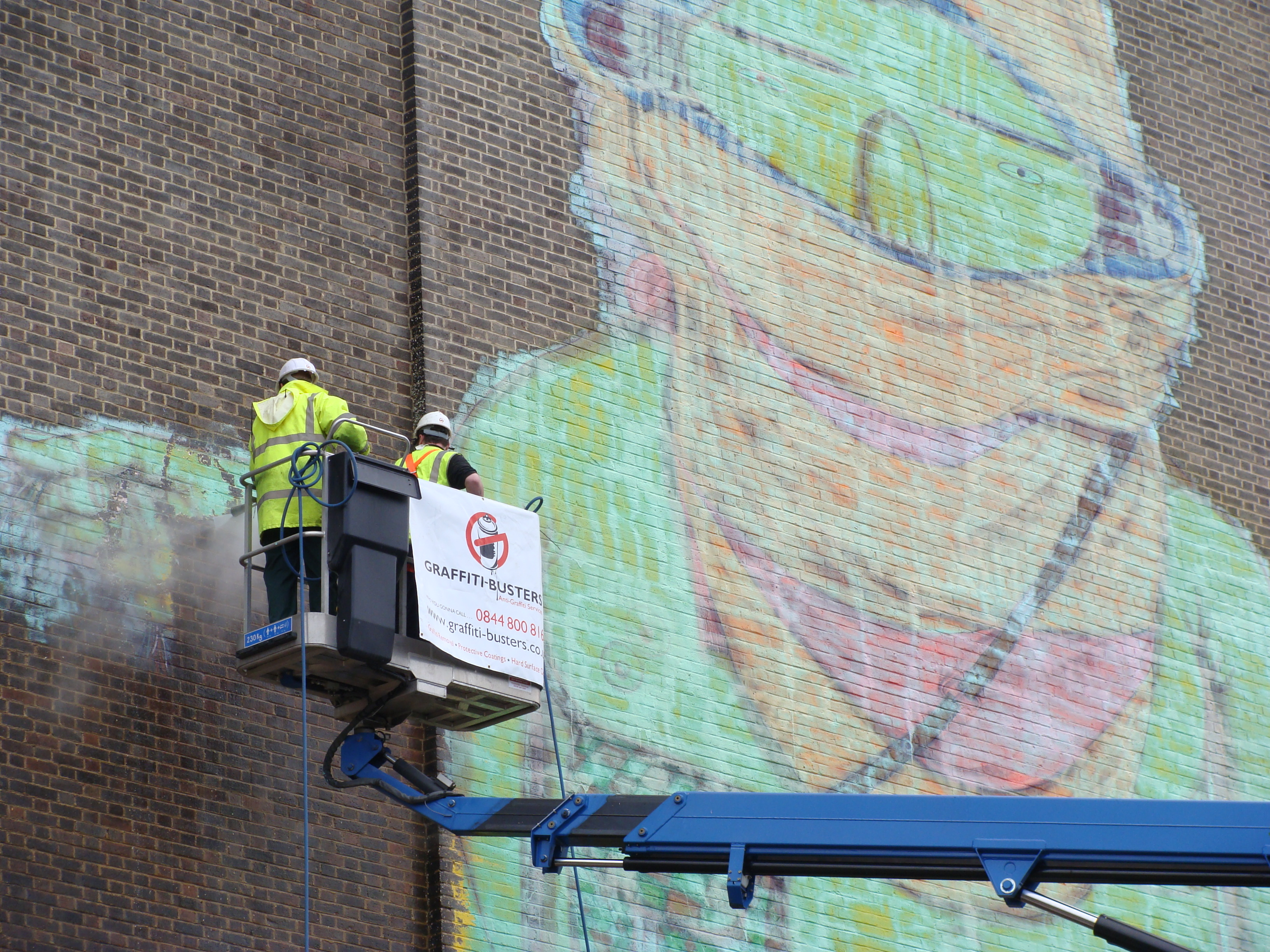
A figure by OSGEMEOS, part of Tate Modern's Street Art exhibition, is removed at the end of the exhibition.

=== Brazil ===
There have been many works by OSGEMEOS made in Brazil. As of the early 2000s a couple of graffiti artists, OSGEMEOS included, were invited to paint trains legally. This raised OSGEMEOS' profile, helping them transition to large-scale public commissioned work, such as murals (for example the Paulista Avenue mural). In 2009, they painted a mural in Vale de Anhangabau, São Paulo, commissioned by the SESC Brazil. Titled "The Foreigner," the piece was originally scheduled to be shown for thirty days, but public approval allowed it to remain until the demolition of the building in 2012. For the 2014 FIFA World Cup in Brazil, the duo were commissioned to decorate the national soccer team's official Boeing 737 aeroplane. The project used over 1,200 cans of spray paint to depict the diversity of Brazilian culture.

=== Asia ===
In 2008, OSGEMEOS painted several works in Mumbai, India; many of were still visible in 2016. More recently, OSGEMEOS exhibited at Art Basel in Hong Kong through the Lehmann Maupin gallery.

=== Europe ===
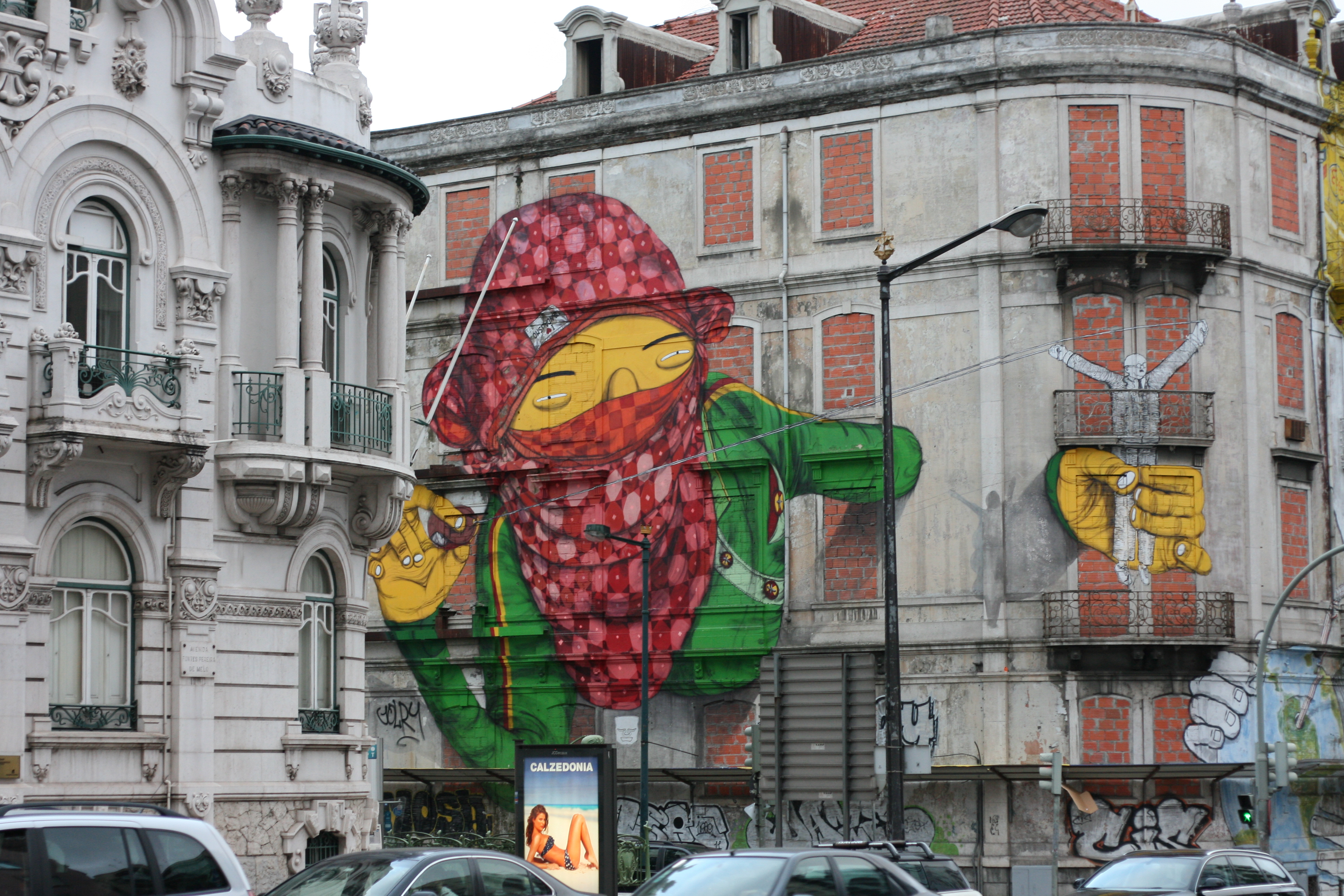
Lisbon, Portugal

OSGEMEOS painted a 16 m by 10 m mural in the centre of Heerlen, Netherlands. This painting was part of the cultural festival Cultura Nova. It was the inspiration for the large opening act where the head character came to life in association with the French group La Plasticiens Volant. The show "L'Etranger" premiered on 29 August 2008 and was one-off seen at Cultura Nova. The wall painting continues to be preserved and is shown on the Schelmenhofje in Heerlen, the Netherlands.

In 2008 OSGEMEOS painted six large-scale murals on Tate Modern in London, for the three month duration of the exhibition.

Lisbon in Portugal also features many works by OSGEMEOS. In 2010 and 2011, OSGEMEOS painted two large-scale murals on the sides of buildings. The project was planned by a public private commission and is considered representative of the Portuguese-Brazilian cultural relationship.

OSGEMEOS participated in the Vulica Brasil mural festival in Minsk, Belarus, in 2015 and 2017. This is a cross-cultural mural festival that is "organized with the official support of the Embassy of Brazil in Belarus, the Minsk City Executive Committee, the Ministry of Culture of the Republic of Belarus and the Leninsky District Administration of Minsk". The festival features artists from Brazil and Belarus collaborating on mural productions in the Belarusian capital city of Minsk.

Other cities in Europe which feature the work of OSGEMEOS include Vilnius, Lithuania; Milan, Italy; Málaga, Spain and Berlin, Germany.

=== North America ===
Their first solo exhibition the United States was held at the Luggage Store Gallery in San Francisco, California in spring 2003 and was titled "Pavil" (or "Wick"); they also created a 25-foot by 15-foot mural on the side of the Luggage Store Gallery building on Market Street.

As part of the Dreamland Artist Club 2005 project, they painted a 130-foot mural in Coney Island on Stillwell Ave. In 2009, OSGEMEOS painted their first mural in Manhattan on the northwest corner of Houston Street and the Bowery. The colorful, fantastic, and imaginative composition was compared to a work of magical realism. One of their works is a wall in Miami, Florida painted for Art Basel Miami Beach. Other cities include Boston and Los Angeles.

In 2012, OSGEMEOS painted a 70-foot by 70-foot public mural in Dewey Square in Boston, Massachusetts, which received public backlash. The piece, created in collaboration with the ICA and Rose F. Kennedy Greenway Conservancy, depicted a young, yellow figure with its face wrapped in a red shirt. On a segment for Fox 25 News, commentators linked the image to racially charged, post-9/11 fears of terrorism. Meanwhile, The Boston Globe considered it to be a successful public artwork. As the original commission was only temporary, the work was removed on schedule in 2013.

In 2014, OSGEMEOS created their largest piece to date, titled "Giants," for the Vancouver Biennale in Vancouver, Canada on six industrial silos. Large and expensive, the work is notable in that it was paid for through crowdfunding.

== Fine art ==
OSGEMEOS have exhibited fine art pieces across the world, including paintings, sculptures, installations, drawings, and performance pieces.

In 2013, they collaborated with luxury brand Louis Vuitton to design a scarf, alongside artist Retna and Lady Aiko. In 2016, an Untitled 2009 piece from OSGEMEOS sold for over $300,000 at market.

In Chelsea New York, a portrait of the twins was commissioned by a NYC street art program the New Allen. Painted by Jorit Agoch, the work can be found on Allen Street in Chelsea, NYC.

== Exhibitions (selected) ==
- 2007!: Waking Up Nights, de Pury & Luxembourg, Zurich.
- 2007: Still on and non the wiser, Von der Heydt-Museum, Kunsthalle Barmen, Wuppertal DE.
- 2008: fresh air smells funny, Kunsthalle Dominikanerkirche, Osnabrück DE.
- 2008: Call it what you like!, KunstCentret Silkeborg Bad DK.
- 2010: Pra quem mora lá, o céu é lá - Berardo Museum Collection of Modern and Contemporary Art, Lisbon
- 2010: Nos braos de um anjo, Galleria Patricia Armocida, Milano
- 2011: Street Art – meanwhile in deepest east anglia, thunderbirds were go…, Von der Heydt-Museum, Kunsthalle Barmen, Wuppertal DE.
- 2012: OSGEMEOS, Miss You, Prism, West Hollywood, CA
- 2012: OSGEMEOS, ICA - Institute of Contemporary Art Boston, Boston, MA
- 2014: OSGEMEOS. A Ópera Da Lua, Galeria Fortes Vilaça, São Paulo
- 2024-2025: OSGEMEOS: Endless Story, Hirshhorn Museum and Sculpture Garden (part of Smithsonian Institution), Washington DC

== Films ==
- Bomb It (2007) by Jon Reiss

== See also ==
- List of twins
- Sestry Feldman, Ukrainian twin street artists
