= The Untitled Space =

Art gallery in New York City

- Established: 2015
- Location: New York City
- Coordinates: 40°43′11″N 74°0′11″W
- Type: Art gallery
- Founder: Indira Cesarine
- Owner: Indira Cesarine
- Website: https://untitled-space.com

The Untitled Space gallery is an art gallery in the Tribeca neighborhood of New York City founded by curator, photographer, magazine editor, and multidisciplinary artist Indira Cesarine in 2015. It exhibits the work of contemporary artists working in various media including painting, sculpture, photography, video, printmaking, mixed media, and performance art.

The gallery's exhibitions often focus on work by women artists that incorporates themes of feminism, political and social equality, and female empowerment.

== Founding ==
Indira Cesarine founded The Untitled Space art gallery in 2015 after building a career as a fashion photographer and artist. She attended Choate Rosemary Hall and studied at Parsons School of Design from the age of 15. After earning a triple degree in art history, women's studies and French literature from Columbia University, Cesarine worked as a fashion photographer in London and Paris as well as in New York, beginning with modeling agencies Elite Model Management, Ford Models, and Wilhelmina Models and later gaining commissions for magazines including Marie Claire, British Vogue, Glamour, InStyle, GQ, and Harper's Bazaar and advertising campaigns for clients including Dior, Kenzo, Charles Jourdan, and Cerruti. She was Editor-at-Large at Don't Tell It and Fashion Editor-at-Large at Lush Magazine, and over the years her commissioned work appeared on over 5,000 editorial magazine pages.

As a fashion photographer she appeared on television shows including Entertainment Tonight and Bravo's Make Me a Supermodel UK and US editions (season 2). She ventured into film directing, with her first short film City of Love featured at the 2007 Cannes Film Festival. Her artwork has been exhibited in group and solo shows at museums and art galleries such as the Metropolitan Museum of Art, the French Embassy Cultural Center in New York, Mattatuck Museum, Hudson Valley MOCA, SPRING/BREAK Art Show, The Watermill Center, Fabergé Big Egg Hunt at Rockefeller Center, ARTWALK NY, The Parlor NYC, and A.I.R. Gallery.

In 2009 Cesarine founded print and digital publication The Untitled Magazine, which covers art, fashion, entertainment, and culture, and which she continues to publish.

She opened The Untitled Space gallery in 2015 “as a platform for women in art and to promote feminist art as a genre.” After struggling to find American representation because “most of the galleries in New York represented 90 percent male artists,” Cesarine began curating her own exhibits of all-female artists “because there weren't that many opportunities for women unless you created them yourself,” Cesarine stated in Asha Dahya's book Today's Wonder Women: Every Day Super Heroes Who are Changing The World. The gallery has hosted (as of April 2023) more than 50 exhibitions showing the work of more than 500 artists. It has become known for controversial and boundary-pushing exhibitions.

In 2019 Cesarine launched a nonprofit, Art4Equality, which supports art exhibitions and other projects, such as film and public art, on the theme of equality. Art4Equality projects include a public art billboard exhibition throughout New York City during the 2020 presidential election, presented in collaboration with The Untitled Space and non-profit SaveArtSpace.

== Focus: Women's Art ==
The gallery has featured numerous exhibitions of art by women, art celebrating women and inspired by women of accomplishment, female self-portraiture, politically activist art, and art addressing sexuality and gender. Its exhibitions explore female empowerment, intersectionality, the female gaze, reproductive rights, and other feminist themes. For Cesarine, the gallery's exploration of female sexuality is part of a broader mission to “[eradicate] the double standard that women can't enjoy and celebrate their sexuality” that still exists “despite the women's sexual liberation movement of the 1960s and 1970s.”

The Untitled Space has garnered attention for its sustained emphasis on artistic activism. In 2017, Cesarine stated that opening The Untitled Space was part of an effort to “expose the gender bias that takes place in the art world” and that it represented “a response to an industry that remains permeable to rampant sexism.”

== Group exhibitions ==
“The ‘F’ Word: Feminism in Art” was a group show in October 2015, curated by Cesarine and Denise Krimershmoys in celebration of The Untitled Magazine's “#GirlPower Issue.” It featured the work of 20 female artists, including CocoRosie, Elektra KB, Frances Goodman, Hye Rim Lee, Mari Kim, Natalie White, Sophia Wallace, Vexta, and Zana Briski.

"In The Raw: The Female Gaze on the Nude" was an exhibit at The Untiled Space May–June, 2016, of 20 female artists and their intimate vision on the female nude. Curated by Indira Cesarine and Coco Dolle, the exhibit included works of photography, painting, sculpture, mixed media and video. Juxtapoz stated of the exhibition, "'In The Raw' creates a cultural discourse of women on women, a female intervention, so to speak, on patriarchal culture.” Bedford + Bowery stated of the exhibition, “does the fact that women artists are depicting female nudes automatically make the work revolutionary? Unfortunately, yes. As an all-women art show, 'In the Raw' is automatically (and sadly) a rarity.” The exhibition featured works by Victoria de Lesseps, Kelsey Bennett, Amanda Charchian, Leah Schrager, Maria Kreyn, Lynn Bianchi, Marie Tomanova, Marianna Rothen, Meredith Ostrom, and Sophia Wallace. "I think it's really interesting how the nude is in many respects still considered taboo by society, yet is such an integral part of the history of art," Cesarine told Priscilla Frank of The Huffington Post, continuing, "I think it is extremely important for women to be liberated from perceiving themselves only via the eyes of men. A one-dimensional view of the world is not reality. There are so many more points of view that are relevant aside from that of the heterosexual male, and it's time for those voices to be heard."

I think it's really interesting how the nude is in many respects still considered taboo by society, yet is such an integral part of the history of art. I think it is extremely important for women to be liberated from perceiving themselves only via the eyes of men. A one-dimensional view of the world is not reality. There are so many more points of view that are relevant aside from that of the heterosexual male, and it's time for those voices to be heard.

— Indira Cesarine in The Huffington Post

Immediately following Donald Trump's election, Cesarine began putting together an exhibit in protest, titled "UPRISE/ANGRY WOMEN." The exhibition was presented in collaboration with ERA Coalition, an equal rights non-profit led by founder and President Emerita Jessica Neuwirth, with a percentage of proceeds going to the organization's Fund for Women's Equality. The gallery called for submissions from female-identifying artists and received more than 1,800 submissions from 400 artists. A final selection of 80 works, including a work by Rose McGowan, constituted the exhibit, which ran in January and February 2017. An exemplification of “art as activism” and reflecting on “the future of women's rights in America in light of the ‘Trumpocalypse,’” the exhibition received attention from Newsweek, Harper's Bazaar, New York Magazine, W Magazine, Dazed, Harper's Bazaar, Teen Vogue, and other publications for its “radical” themes. Cesarine told Newsweek about this exhibit, “Art can be an act of protest in itself. It can be a catalyst for change." In addition to McGowan, Ann Lewis, Fahren Feingold, Rebecca Leveille, Sophia Wallace, and Cesarine were exhibiting artists.

A year later the gallery presented a follow-up exhibit, "ONE YEAR OF RESISTANCE," on the theme of artists responding to the political climate in America since the election of Donald Trump.; submissions were open to all genders, with the selected works reflecting themes including immigration rights, reproductive rights, climate change, transgender rights, white supremacy, gender equality, gun control, and sexual harassment. The group exhibition was curated by Cesarine, who also exhibited artwork. It was widely recognized for its reflection of art as a means of political protest, with the Guardian noting that it “[evoked] the kind of hand-in-hand solidarity that's been on display in the last 12 months.” It was featured on CNN and in Vogue US, Vogue Italia, Interview and other publications. Vogue described it as "a collective meditation on a year of rage that pushes mediums to the extreme.” Among the exhibiting artists were Alexandra Rubenstein, Alison Jackson, Ann Lewis, Leah Schrager, Grace Graupe-Pillard, Michele Pred, Olive Allen, Parker Day, Rebecca Leveille, Signe Pierce, and Tatana Kellner.

“LIFEFORCE” was an all-female group show in 2016 curated by Kelsey and Rémy Bennett, granddaughters of Tony Bennett. The sisters each contributed original work to the exhibition, alongside notable artists Hein Koh, Juno Calypso, Maisie Cousins, Monica Garza, Nadia Lee Cohen, Panteha Abareshi, Parker Day, Sam Cannon, and Signe Pierce. In an interview with Vice, the Bennetts stated that the show's cyberfeminist themes were inspired by Donna Haraway's 1985 essay, “A Cyborg Manifesto,” in which Haraway described “the utopian dream of the hope for a monstrous world without gender. The exhibit featured artworks that explored “the feminine in the context of a genderless future.”

“SHE INSPIRES,” curated by Cesarine in May 2017, presented work by 60 artists honoring historical women and women's contributions to history and culture. The exhibit was presented in collaboration with She Should Run, a non-profit organization that encourages women to run for office. The exhibited works included a painting by Cesarine inspired by women's suffrage figurehead Victoria Woodhull, in addition to works by Ann Lewis, Fischer Cherry, Lynn Bianchi, Jess de Wahls, Rebecca Leveille, and Sylvia Maier. The gallery described the exhibition's aim as “not only [to] explore themes of inspiration of present day female role models, but also the legacy of women who have paved the way, and to inspire and empower others with visual art on the subject.” Vice quoted Cesarine saying the intention was to “honor and celebrate women who have impacted our culture and tell their stories which should be rightfully included not just as 'women's history,' but everyone's history."

Another major exhibition in 2017 was the June–July show "SECRET GARDEN: The Female Gaze on Erotica," featuring 40 female artists curated by Cesarine. It presented figurative works of nudes and erotic art by female-identifying artists. The title was inspired by Nancy Friday's book My Secret Garden, with the exhibition's themes identifying with Friday's history as a figurehead in the feminist sexual liberation movement. The Cut noted its depictions of “contorted, vulnerable, and simultaneously empowered women as subjects whose sexuality cannot be deduced or simplified to fit stereotypical criteria.” It included works by artists including Fahren Feingold, Hiba Schahbaz, Julia Fox, Betty Tompkins and Joan Semmel.

The 2018 exhibition "(HOTEL) XX" was an immersive hotel-room installation at the SPRING/BREAK Art Show, for which Indira Cesarine curated the artwork of 20+ female-identifying artists including Alexandra Rubenstein, Fahren Feingold, Julia Fox, Kat Toronto aka Miss Meatface, Meredith Ostrom, Myla Dalbesio, Suzanne Wright as well as works by Cesarine, on the subject of what happens behind the closed doors of hotel rooms. A syntactical play on female sex chromosomes, “(HOTEL) XX” emphasized female sexuality outside of the male gaze; Dujour noted that it “reimagined a seedy motel as a site for openly exploring female sexuality and excess rather than sexual subterfuge."

The gallery produced the group exhibit "EDEN" at the 2019 SPRING/BREAK Art Show, curated by Cesarine and showcasing 20+ female artists at the UN Plaza in New York City. Exploring the concept of the Garden of Eden, the exhibit investigated its history, symbolism, and cultural impact through a feminist lens, unpacking themes including the roles of Adam and Eve, sexual temptation, and the concept of original sin. Artists Alexandra Rubinstein, Gracelee Lawrence, Hiba Schahbaz, Jasmine Murrell, Jeanette Hayes, Jessica Lichtenstein, Leah Schrager, Sarah Maple, and Cesarine each exhibited work. Additionally, the exhibition featured a live performance by dancer Katherine Crockett and body painting by Trina Merry.

The 2019 group show "IRL: Investigating Reality," curated by Cesarine, examined themes of real life and reality versus fictional, online, or idealized worlds, as well as the influence of technology on the modern world. The exhibited artworks were described as “intimate works charged with self-interrogation, vignettes of reality, explorations of realism, revelations of private lives, as well as works full of satire and humour that address the intersection of the digital and physical worlds.” “IRL” included work by Jeanette Hayes, who also had a solo show at the gallery that year. Also among the 46 exhibiting artists were Alison Jackson, Grace Graupe Pillard, Karen Bystedt, Katie Commodore, Logan White, Reisha Perlmutter, and Robin Tewes.

Also in 2019 the gallery presented "BODY BEAUTIFUL," a show featuring 50 artists' work including painting, drawing, photography, video, and sculpture that highlighted the power of the figure and reflected on the body positivity movement. Dazed described it as a “comprehensive celebration of the human form [with] body-positive depictions of the human form, including all body types, ages, and genders, celebrating diversity as well as the timeless beauty of the body." I-D/Vice reported that the exhibition addressed “the shift in our present cultural narrative, in which limited conceptions of beauty are being flipped to celebrate a fuller aesthetic spectrum.” In addition to curating “BODY BEAUTIFUL,” Cesarine contributed a portrait of body-positive activist Tess Holliday. Anna Sampson, Anne Barlinckhoff, Elisa Garcia de la Huerta, Haley Morris-Cafiero, Hiba Schabaz, Lisa Levy, and Sarah Maple were also exhibiting artists. The exhibition raised funds for Art4Equality.

"Art4Equality x Life, Liberty & The Pursuit of Happiness" in fall 2020 was a group exhibition of more than 50 artists that combined a gallery show and a public art billboard series presented in collaboration with non-profits SaveArtSpace and Art4Equality at various New York City locations, focused on responses to the COVID-19 pandemic as well as the political and civil unrest of that summer. The billboards, which were located across Manhattan, Brooklyn, and Queens, NYC, featured artworks by Panteha Abareshi, Indira Cesarine, Kim McCarty, Anne Barlinckhoff, Ashley Chew, Donna Bassin, Fahren Feingold, Jodie Herrera, Meg Lionel Murphy, Saruupa Sidaarth, and Travis Rueckert. Exhibiting gallery artists additionally included Alexandra Rubinstein, Ann Lewis, Karen Bystedt, Lynn Bianchi, Michele Pred, and Robin Tewes.

In 2021 the gallery presented a group show of textile and fiber-based art by 40 women artists titled "UNRAVELED: Confronting the Fabric of Fiber Art." The exhibition presented “figurative and abstract works that address our lived experience and history through the lens of women weaving, knotting, twining, plaiting, coiling, pleating, lashing, and interlacing.” Cesarine curated the exhibition to reflect the concept of “unraveling” narratives of “self-identification, race, religion, gender, sexuality, our shared experience, as well as protest and the patriarchy” through “embroidery, felt, woven and hooked rugs, braided and sewn hair, sewn fabrics, discarded clothing, cross-stitching, repurposed materials and more.” Caroline Wayne, Jeila Gueramian, Katie Cercone, Katie Commodore, Katrina Majkut, Linda Friedman Schmidt, and Orly Cogan were among the exhibiting artists.

“The INNOVATE Exhibit” was a 2021 group show that presented work by more than 40 artists across a variety of media, including painting, sculpture, fiber art, collage, photography, wearable art, digital art, audio art, performance art, and art using augmented reality. Curated by Cesarine, it explored “in-depth themes of pioneering creativity with artists defying the odds to explore new frontiers with their work” and coincided with the release of The Untitled Magazine's “INNOVATE Issue.” Andreas Wannerstedt, Alexy Préfontaine aka Aeforia, Asher Levine, Joanna Grochowska, Laura Kimmel, Leah Schrager, Martha Zmpounou, Synchrodogs, Watson Mere, and Yuge Zhou were exhibiting artists.

Another group show, "The REBEL Exhibition," curated by Cesarine in 2022, presented work by 30 contemporary artists including Anna Delvey and Duran Duran's Nick Rhodes, who exhibited photography of model Lottie Moss, half-sister of Kate Moss. The exhibit showcased artwork of various styles and mediums, each addressing what it means “to be a rebel in our contemporary world.” Cesarine, Andrew Soria, Bartosz Beda, Cara De Angelis, Fahren Feingold, George Afedzi Hughes, Georgina Billington, Josh Universe, Katie Commodore, Parker Day, and Zach Grear were also among the exhibiting artists.

In March 2025 the gallery mounted its 10th anniversary exhibition, "UPRISE 2025: The Art of Resistance," a collaboration with nonprofit initiative Art4Equality. The exhibition's title reflected the title of the gallery's major 2017 exhibition "UPRISE/ANGRY WOMEN" which was a response to Donald Trump's first election and featured the work of 80 female-identifying artists. The 2025 exhibition was curated by Indira Cesarine and opened on March 8, International Women's Day. It included the work of 100 artists of all genders who "have used their platforms to speak out against inequality, oppression, and injustice," celebrating "a decade of art, activism, and unwavering resistance at The Untitled Space." It included artists previously exhibited at the gallery as well as artists new to the space. Cesarine told Artnet that it "featured artists we’ve worked with over the past decade—such as Rose McGowan, Natalie White, Alison Jackson, and Victoria de Lesseps—alongside new voices including Jemima Kirke. What made it powerful was the sense of solidarity. It felt less like a single exhibition and more like a collective affirmation.” The exhibition also included work by Fahren Feingold, Anna Delvey, Molly Crabapple, Nick Rhodes, and many others including gallery founder Indira Cesarine.

== Solo exhibitions ==
In 2017, Cesarine curated the debut self-titled solo show of watercolor artist Fahren Feingold, which ran from September–October at The Untitled Space. The gallery later mounted solo shows of Feingold’s work including “Golden Touch” and “PEEP SHOW” in 2018, “NO END TO LOVE” in 2020, “WET DREAMS” and “HIGH ON LIFE” in 2021, and a benefit online solo auction “LIVING FOR LOVE” in 2023 raising funds for women’s mental health in partnership with SeekHer Foundation.

“The End of Love” was a solo show of paintings in May 2018 by figurative artist Rebecca Leveille, also known as Rebecca Guay. The exhibition, curated by Cesarine, featured works reflecting themes of sensuality, the female gaze, and media imagery through “an exploration of the poetic versus the literal.”

A solo show at the 2019 SPRING/BREAK Art Show curated by Cesarine for The Untitled Space gallery at United Nations Plaza presented Alison Jackson's photos of celebrity lookalikes, titled "Mental Images x Alison Jackson," on the theme of people's obsessions with celebrities making their "mental images" seem more real than records of actual reality.

A self-titled solo show of multidisciplinary artist Kat Toronto aka Miss Meatface was exhibited in July 2019. Curated by Cesarine, “MISS MEATFACE” featured the artist’s photographs exploring female sexuality, feminine beauty, gender roles, and the objectification of women. Toronto was later featured in “SPRING INTO ACTION,” a 2023 benefit solo art auction supporting women’s reproductive rights, which featured over 50 of the artist’s works.

In 2019 the debut U.S. mixed-media solo exhibit of work by British-Iranian artist Sarah Maple entitled "Thoughts and Prayers" explored U.S. gun violence, the immigrant experience and other topical issues with works that spanned 10 years. Artnet quoted Maple as saying about the exhibit, “I am interested in how a lack of action directly and/or indirectly inflicts suffering and potential violence on its citizens.”

“EXPOSED,” a duo show exhibiting works by feminist artists Grace Graupe-Pillard and Robin Tewes, an original member of feminist art collective Guerrilla Girls, ran from September–October 2019 and featured new and historical works from both artists that aimed to challenge gender roles in contemporary America.

In March 2020, the gallery mounted a solo exhibition of works by Indira Cesarine titled “THE LABYRINTH” benefiting Art4Equality. Presented as an immersive installation of a maze, the exhibition featured photography, video, painting, sculpture, and a series of performances inspired by the artwork, including a performance by dancer Katherine Crockett. It reflected the artist’s contemporary female gaze on Surrealism and explored the juxtaposition of “subconscious realities bound by the contrasts of hyperrealism and ethereal symbolism.” Cesarine stated that the works were created partially in response to the influence of Surrealist masters including Jean Cocteau, Man Ray, and Dora Maar, resulting in a “journey through our fantasies and expectations, rendered through the lens of dreams and desires.” The exhibition was closed one day after its opening on March 12, 2020 due to the COVID-19 pandemic shutdown and reopened later that summer.

In 2020 the gallery presented solo shows by Tom Smith, Jessica Lichtenstein, Lola Jiblazee and Indira Cesarine, as well as the third solo show by Fahren Feingold. The gallery mounted another exhibition of Feingold's work in 2021 and a third in 2023.

Indira Cesarine's solo exhibition "LUMIÈRE" debuted on January 31, 2024, presented by The Untitled Space and MakersPlace and premiering at the Canvas 3.0 gallery in the Oculus, after which it was on view at the Untitled Space during February. Consisting of surreal photographic light paintings of nude silhouettes body-painted with vines, leaves, and spirals, it "explored illumination as a visual metaphor for enlightenment, hope, and the ongoing pursuit of understanding." Fractyll described the works as "physicalizing the hidden energies we all feel...Indira works specifically with dancers to generate that physical and spiritual energy."

In March 2024 the gallery presented "Skye Cleary Never Gets Old," paintings purportedly by Skye Cleary, a sex-doll character created by performance artist Lisa Levy and painter Sharilyn Neidhart.

In May 2024 it presented a retrospective solo show, "Ethereal Legacy: The Art of Fahren Feingold." Feingold had died in September 2023. The exhibition description noted the artist's "unapologetic depiction of the female nude, challenging centuries of censorship and shaming surrounding the female body." The gallery represents Feingold's estate.

== Selected exhibitions and events, 2015–2026 ==
- 2015: "The 'F' Word: Feminism in Art"
- 2016: “In the Raw: The Female Gaze on the Nude" Group Show
- 2016: “LIFEFORCE” Group Exhibition
- 2016: “SELF REFLECTION” Group Exhibition
- 2016: “Cardiac Insomniac” – a solo exhibition in collaboration with threeASFOUR of works by ANGE (Angela Donhauser), a founding member of New York fashion house threeASFOUR.
- 2017: "UPRISE/ANGRY WOMEN" Group Exhibition
- 2017: "SHE INSPIRES" Group Exhibition (Benefit for She Should Run) – works in various media focusing on inspirational women (cultural figures, scientists, artists) such as Queen Latifah, Michelle Obama, Frida Kahlo
- 2017: Fahren Feingold, “FAHREN FEINGOLD” Solo Show
- 2017: "SECRET GARDEN: The Female Gaze on Erotica" Group Exhibition – 40 female artists including Fahren Feingold
- 2018: "ONE YEAR OF RESISTANCE" Group Exhibition
- 2018: "(HOTEL) XX" Group Exhibition at SPRING/BREAK Art Show
- 2018: “DEFINING FORM” Group Exhibition

- 2018: "The End of Love" – solo show of paintings by figurative artist Rebecca Leveille, also known as Rebecca Guay.
- 2019: Sarah Maple Solo Show "Thoughts and Prayers"
- 2019: “EDEN” Group Exhibition at SPRING/BREAK Art Show
- 2019: "Mental Images x Alison Jackson" Solo Show at SPRING/BREAK Art Show
- 2019: "IRL: Investigating Reality" Group Exhibition
- 2019: "BODY BEAUTIFUL" Group Exhibition
- 2019: Grace Graupe-Pillard and Robin Tewes, “EXPOSED” Duo Show
- 2020: "Art4Equality x Life, Liberty & The Pursuit of Happiness" Group Exhibition + Public Art Billboard Series (Untitled Space and public New York City locations)
- 2020: Jessica Lichtenstein, “...Do They Make A Sound?” Solo Show at SPRING/BREAK Art Show
- 2020: Indira Cesarine, “THE LABYRINTH” Installation and Solo Show
- 2020: Katie Commodore, “Between Friends and Lovers” Solo Show
- 2020: Tom Smith, “STRIP” Solo Show
- 2021: "UNRAVELED: Confronting the Fabric of Fiber Art" Group Exhibition
- 2021: “The INNOVATE Exhibit” Group Exhibition
- 2021: Fahren Feingold "Wet Dreams" Solo Show

- 2022: Faustine Badrichani “Multifaceted” Solo Show
- 2022: "The REBEL Exhibition" Group Show
- 2022: Giulia Grillo Aka Petite Doll Solo Show

- 2023: "The Lost Warhols" Group Exhibition
- 2023: Elena Chestnykh "Songs of Summer" Solo Exhibition
- 2023: Sophie Goudman-Peachey Solo Exhibition

- 2024: Indira Cesarine "LUMIÈRE" Solo Exhibition
- 2024: "Skye Cleary Never Gets Old"
- 2024: "Ethereal Legacy: The Art of Fahren Feingold"
- 2024: Katrina Jurjans “hence living, hence magical” Solo Exhibition
- 2024: Tabitha Whitley Solo Exhibition
- 2024: “FUTURE VISION” Nationwide Public Art Billboard Series + Exhibition: SaveArtSpace x The Untitled Space
- 2024: Leah Schrager "It's Just a Phase" Solo Exhibition

- Feb. 2025: Michael Rose "In Spite of It" solo exhibition
- March–June 2025: "UPRISE 2025: The Art of Resistance" 10th anniversary group exhibition
- July–September 2025: Fahren Feingold "Lasting Legacy" solo virtual exhibition of works from the artist's estate
- July–September 2025: Kristy Gordon "Enchanted Visions" solo virtual exhibition
- July–October 2025: Joanna Grochowska "Transhumanism" solo virtual exhibition
- October–November 2025: Helena Calmfors "Floral Disciplines" solo exhibition
- December 2025: Martha Zmpounou "Fragments of Becoming" solo exhibition

- March 2026: Sarah Maple and Meg Mosley "Domestic Abyss" photography exhibit
