= Alison Jackson =

Alison Jackson may refer to:

- Alison Jackson (artist) (born 1960)
- Alison Jackson (cyclist) (born 1988)
