= Frances Coombe =

Canadian model

Frances Coombe (born 1992 or 1993) is a Canadian model.

== Early life and education ==
Coombe grew up in Toronto alongside his sister and brother. At age five, he became a vegetarian. His extracurriculars included dance and music. He was interested in fashion and arts from a young age, but hadn't considered modeling as a career until he was scouted.

== Modelling career ==
Coombe was scouted by Elite Toronto in the grade 10.

Coombe began modelling in Toronto in late 2009. In 2010, he won the P&G Beauty and Grooming Award for Best New Face. He began modeling for Muse Model Management in 2011.

In fall 2013, Coombe modeled in Milan for the first time, where he walked in runway shows for Alberta Ferretti, Bottega Veneta, Just Cavalli, and Moschino. In 2015 and 2017, Coombe walked the runway for Gucci.

Coombe has appeared in Elle Canada, Glamour Italia, Harper’s Bazaar, L'Officiel Malaysia, Vogue Germany, Vogue Italia, Vogue Ukraine, and Vogue UK. He has worked on ad campaigns for Fleur du Mal, Red Valentino, and Norma Kamali. He has also participated in runway shows for Carolina Herrera and Viktor & Rolf.

In 2023, Coombe filed a lawsuit against Muse Model Management, saying that after coming out as non binary to the company in October 2021, he had been subject to a hostile work environment. The suit alleges Muse told Coombe they would continue to treat him as a woman in the modelling realm. During a photoshoot in 2021, which Coombe had arranged in order to remarket himself as an androgynous model, Muse allegedly "insisted that [Coombe] wear women’s clothing, i.e., a bikini, and refused to permit him to wear men’s boxer briefs or men’s shoes," according to the lawsuit. After coming out to the company in 2022 as a transgender man, Coombe says he was removed from Muse's website without notice and was told in a meeting with the company that they would not allow him to work as a male model, saying he was "insufficiently masculine". In 2026, the United States District Court in Manhattan refused to dismiss the case before trial, ruling that Coombe has produced enough evidence that a jury could rule in his favor.

Coombe has since found work with another company, We Speak Model Management.

== Personal life ==
Coombe moved to New York at age 18, and lived on the Upper East Side as of 2014.

In 2022, Coombe came out as a gay trans man, after previously identifying as nonbinary. He began HRT in January 2022.

Coombe is of partial Scottish descent.
