= Nimay Ndolo =

American writer and online personality (born 1994)

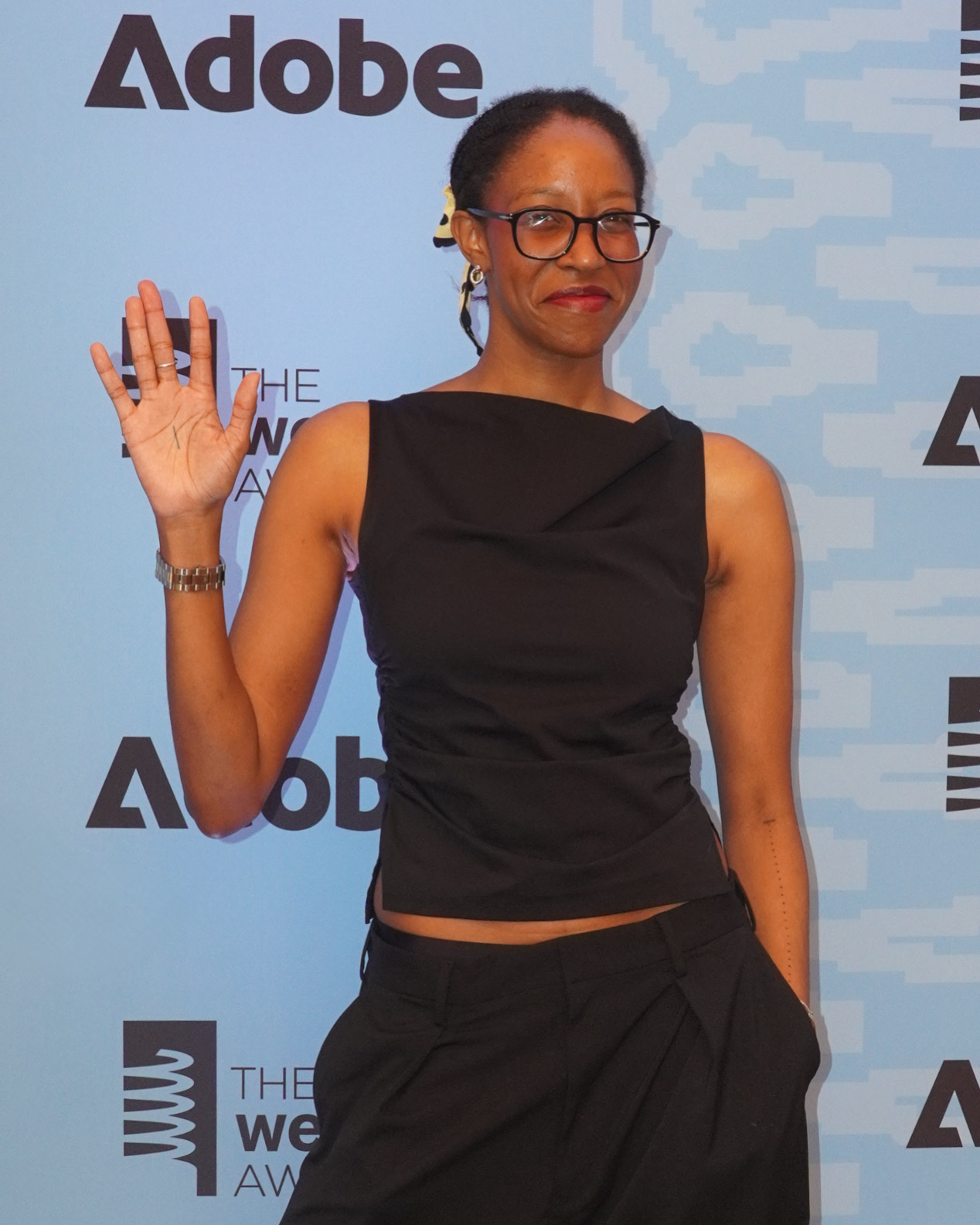
- Ndolo at the Webby Awards
- Born: Obumneme-Ekenechi Yadi Ndolo; August 21, 1994 (age 32); Memphis, Tennessee, U.S.
- Education: Georgia State University
- Occupations: writer; online personality; software developer; actress
- Years active: 2018 – present

TikTok information
- Page: Nimay Ndolo
- Followers: 2.4 million
- Last updated: October 3, 2025

Nimay Ndolo (born 21 August 1994, as Obumneme-Ekenechi Yadi Ndolo), is an American writer, actress and online personality. She was named one of Rolling Stone's top influencers of 2024 and one of the Webby Awards and Time Magazine's top influencers of 2025.

== Early life and education ==
Ndolo was born in Memphis, Tennessee, into a family of three children, to parents of Nigerian Igbo descent, who immigrated from Enugu, Nigeria to the United States. She attended Douglas County High School and began writing at the age of 13, influenced by High School Musical 2 and West Side Story. She studied theatre and film at Georgia State University, but did not graduate.

== Career ==
Before beginning her software development and content creation career, Ndolo worked as a delivery driver for Uber Eats and briefly as a freight broker at TQL. After being fired during the 2020 COVID-19 pandemic, she taught herself web development, learning CSS, HTML, and JavaScript, and completing General Assembly's frontend development bootcamp, later becoming a front end developer for a startup company.

In 2021, she began posting on TikTok while still working as a software developer until 2023 when she began working as an influencer full time. She built her audience by delivering fast-paced front-facing camera comedy style monologues on topics ranging from tech to politics, fashion, cryptocurrency, climate, sports, and general culture. She gained millions of followers for her commentary in the process. She expanded her content into political commentary, and has interviewed American senators Cory Booker, Ed Markey, politician Zohran Mamdani, former US transportation secretary Pete Buttigieg, New York City Councilman for District 36, Chi Osse and American ecologist, Nalini Nadkarni among others.

In 2024, Ndolo partook in VidCon 2024 and in the same year, was recognized as one of the Top 25 Most Influential Influencers by Rolling Stone magazine. In 2025, she was listed as an honoree by the Webby Awards, was a Met Gala carpet correspondent for Instagram, and was recognized as one of the Time 100 Creators of 2025 by Time Magazine.

She has appeared as a guest on several podcasts, including Pair of Kings, Go Touch Grass and Dating Unsettled. She was also a panelist at the Future Forward PAC event titled Return on Culture, alongside Jeff Lawson, the owner of The Onion.

In her creative career, her artwork Visual Sound: Splat was listed and sold on Artsy as part of a show in collaboration with Tiny Doors Atlanta and Greg Mike's ABV gallery. She attended the Public Art Fund gala in 2025. She also directed the NoBudge short film Jane, Jean, John, & Jesus Make an Experimental Song in 2017, and in 2024, collaborated with Penelope Gazin's Fashion Brand Company on a limited shirt release.

She has been featured in Time Magazine, Rolling Stone, Vogue, Yahoo Finance, Newsweek, The New York Times, NBC News, Headgum, AOL, and iHeartRadio.

=== Advocacy and politics ===
She is a women's rights and environmental activist, and the founder of the nonprofit organization, CityAesthetica. She has spoken publicly about the challenges faced by Black women creators, including unequal treatment in politics and influencer marketing. She was a media credentialed content creator at the 2024 Democratic National Convention. In 2025, Ndolo attempted a solo run for New York City Council district 34. She was also honored, alongside Congressman Maxwell Frost, by Planned Parenthood as a 2025 creator champion.

== Awards and recognition ==
Ndolo has received honors for her work including:

- Time 100 Creators
- Webby Awards Comedy Creator Honoree 2025
- Planned Parenthood Creator Champion Award
- Rolling Stone Most Influential Creators of 2024

== Filmography ==
Year	Title	Role
2018	Jane, Jean, John, & Jesus Make and Experimental Song	Writer; Short film
2025	Knights of Night	Actress (as Zora); Alongside James Marshall Reilly
