= Sarah Maple =

British artist

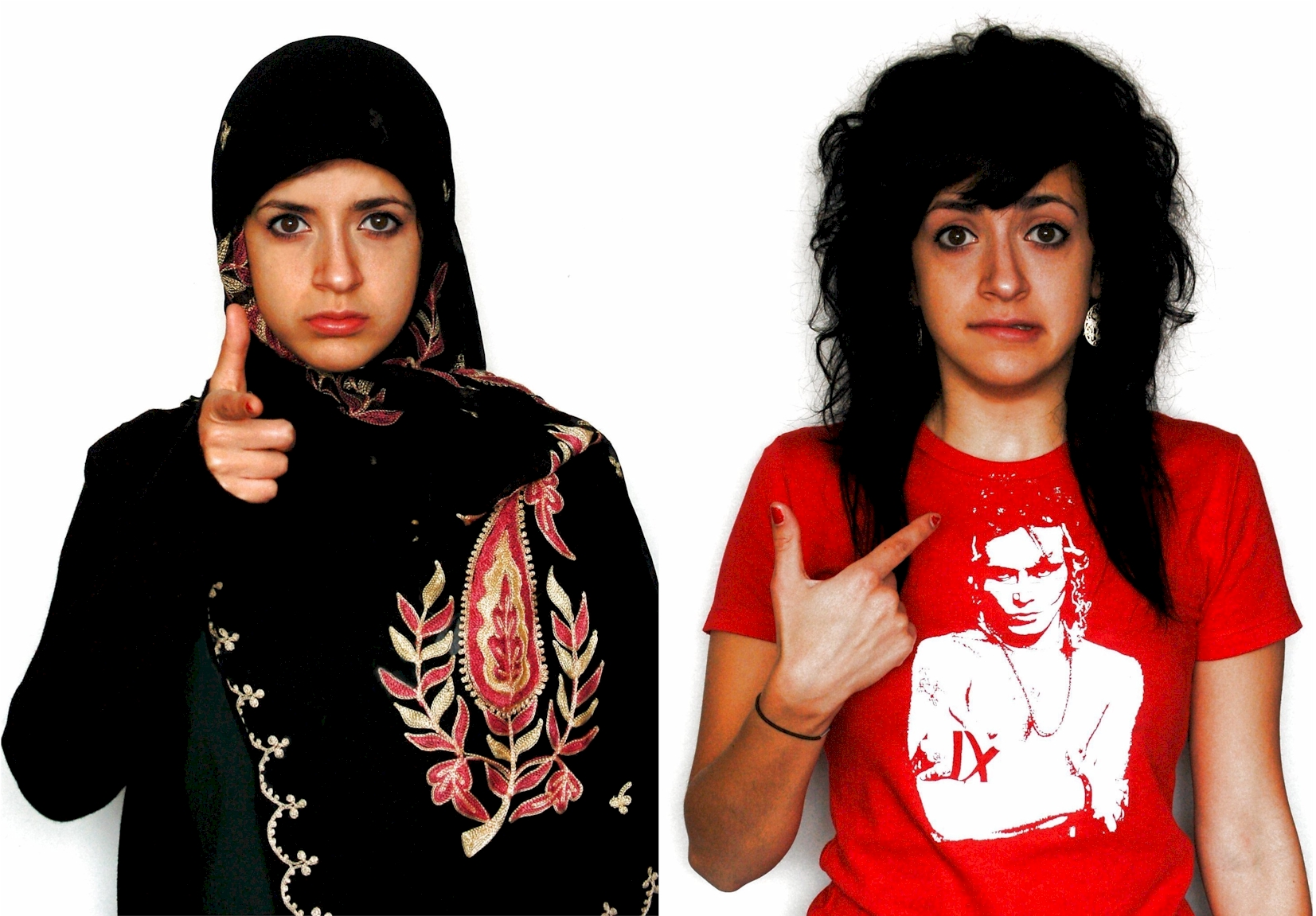
- YOU by Sarah Maple
- Born: Sarah Khanum Maple; 1985 (age 40–41); Eastbourne, England
- Education: Kingston University
- Known for: painting
- Notable work: "Haram", "Menstruate with Pride", "Anti Rape Cloak"
- Children: 1
- Awards: 4 New Sensations Sky Academy Arts Scholarship

Sarah Khanum Maple (born 1985) is an English visual artist. She was recognised for her work after being awarded the "New Sensations" prize.

== Early life and education ==
Maple was born in Eastbourne, Sussex to a Kenyan-born, Birmingham-raised Punjabi Muslim mother and a British father.

In 2003, Maple took a Foundation Course at the University of the Creative Arts. Four years later, she graduated with a Bachelor of Fine Arts with honours from Kingston University.

== Work ==
In 2007 she won the "4 New Sensations" competition, run by Channel 4 in conjunction with the Saatchi Gallery. The competition's aim is "to find the most exciting and imaginative artistic talent in the UK" from among art students graduating that year.

In 2015 she won a Sky Academy Arts Scholarship to produce a new body of work for a new solo exhibition in 2017 Maple has exhibited her work at galleries and institutions such as Tate Britain, The New Art Exchange, Golden Thread Gallery and Kunstihoone Tallinn

In 2015 she released her first book You Could Have Done This, a hardback art book of selected works with contributions from Beverley Knowles (curator and writer), Margaret Harrison (artist), Oreet Ashery (artist) and Anne Swartz (professor Art History)

In 2019 her debut U.S. mixed-media solo exhibit took place at The Untitled Space in New York City, entitled "Thoughts and Prayers," with work that spanned 10 years. It explored topical issues including the immigrant experience and gun violence.

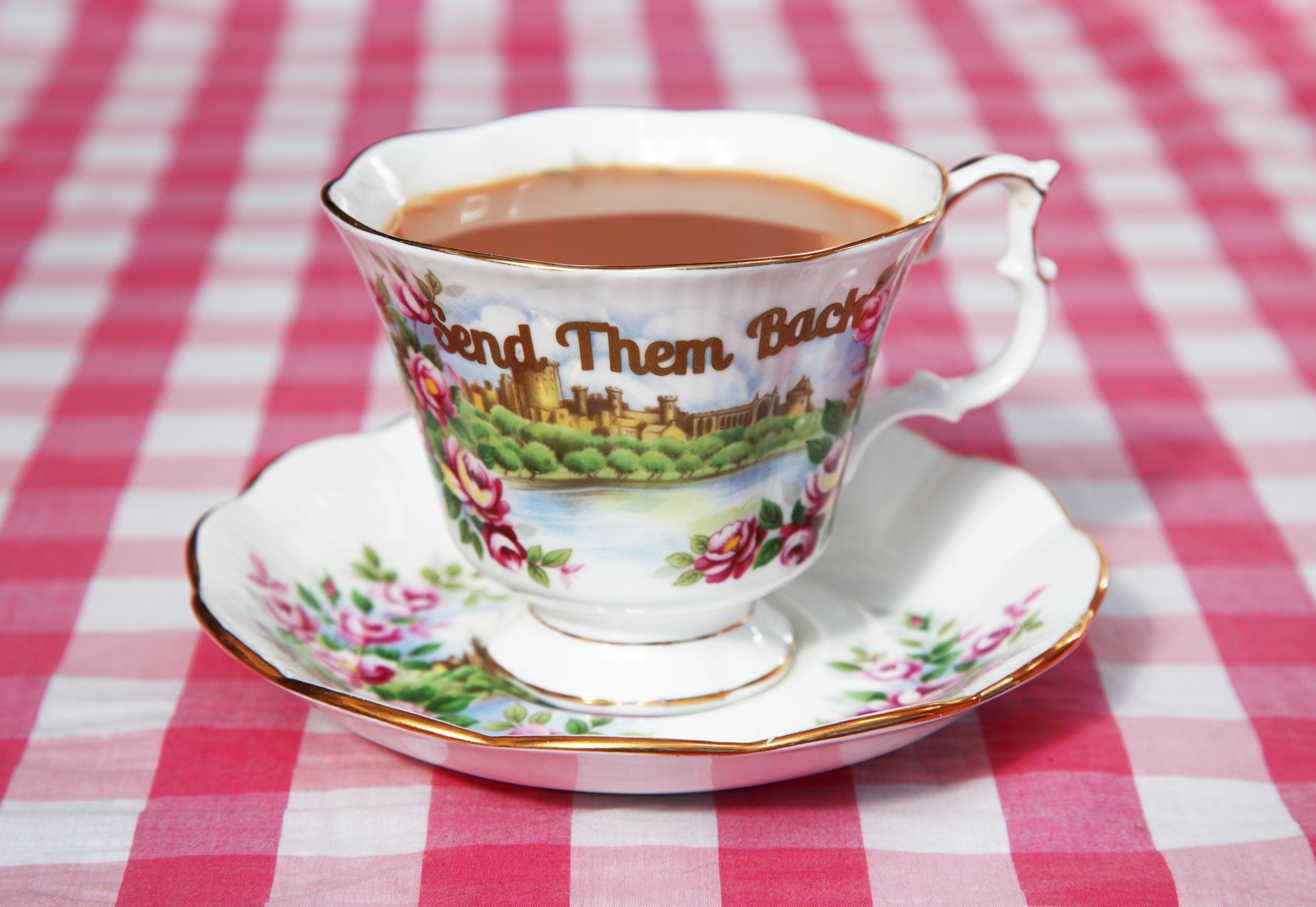

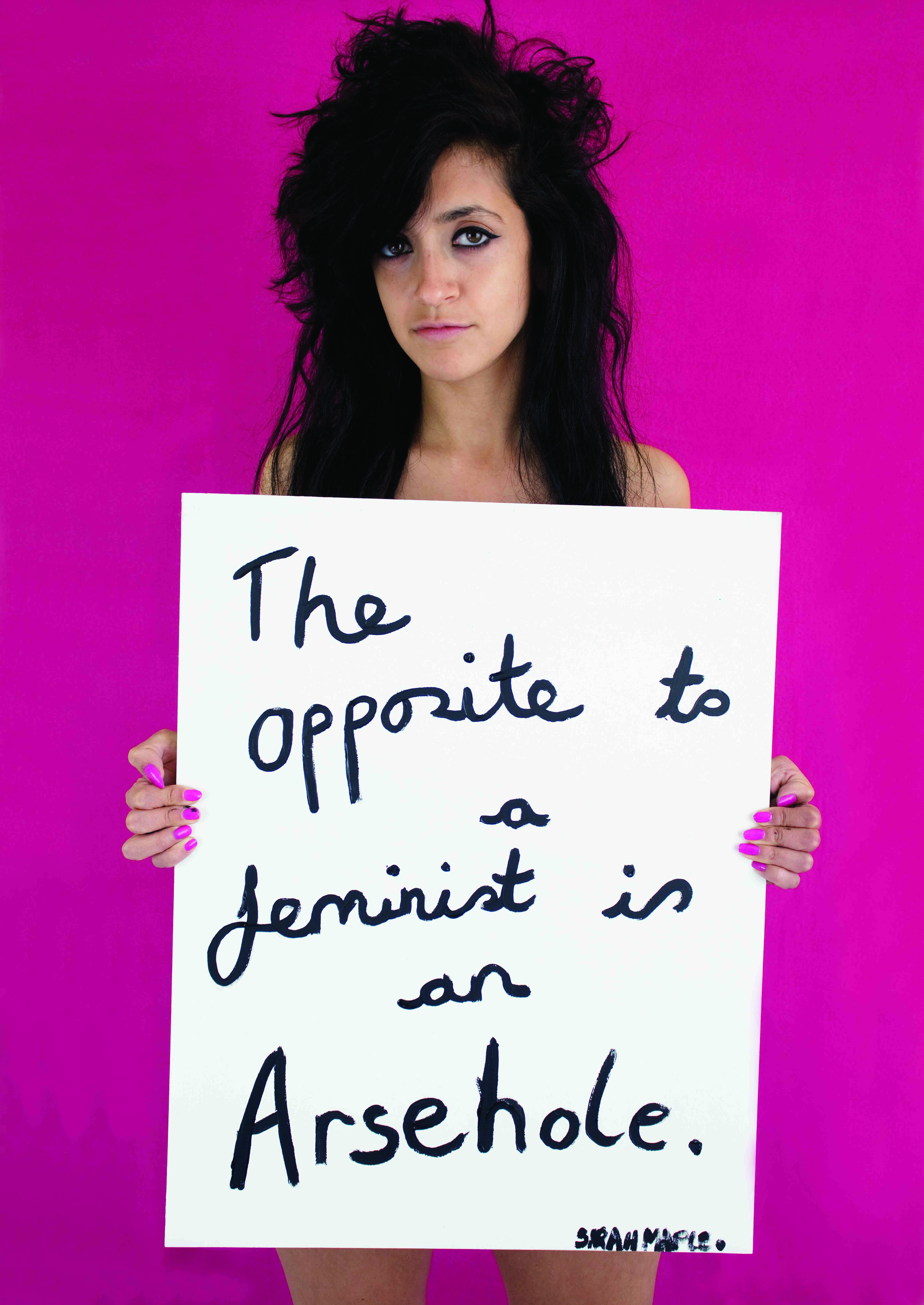

== Personal life ==
Maple lives in Crawley with her husband Jamie and their daughter.
