= Phoebe Boswell =

British artist

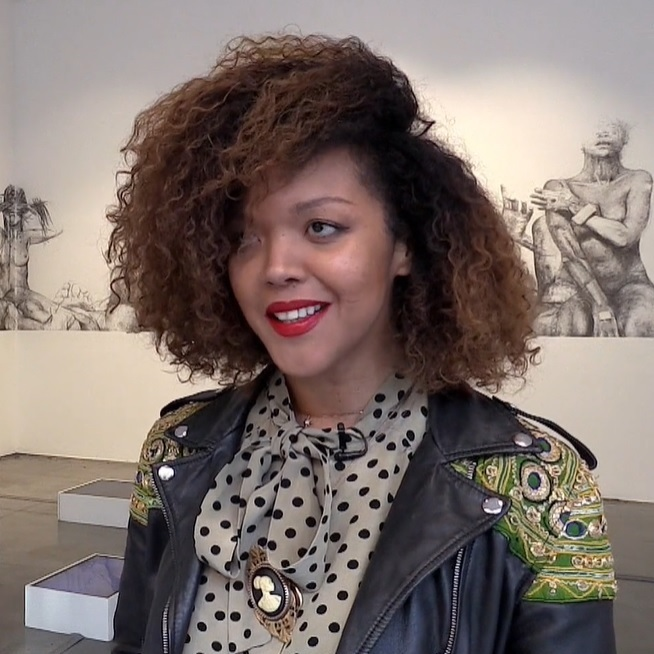
- Phoebe Boswell The Space Between Things, Autograph, London, 2019.
- Born: Phoebe Wanjiru Boswell; 2 January 1982 (age 44); Nairobi, Kenya
- Occupation: Multi-media Artist / Film maker

Phoebe Boswell (born 2 January 1982) is a multi-media artist and film maker based in London, UK. She has won awards in the UK and Ukraine.

== Early life ==
Phoebe Boswell was born in Nairobi, Kenya, the daughter of Timothy, a pilot, and Joyce, a teacher. They moved to Oman when she was two years old, and then to Bahrain three years later. She attended St. Christopher's School in Isa Town, Bahrain, followed by Hurtwood House. Moving to London, Boswell studied at Central St. Martins, University of the Arts London and the Slade School of Art at the University of London. She then moved back to Bahrain to make sense of her expatriate childhood, and a solo exhibition comprising portraits and recorded conversations was held at the National Museum in Bahrain, and published as Bahrainona. She also co-founded the arts society, Elham. Her graduate film The Girl With Stories in Her Hair was nominated for a number of awards, including Best Film at the British Animation Awards Public Choice, Best Student film at the Bradford Animation Festival, and Best Animation in Rushes Soho Shorts.

== Career ==
Phoebe Boswell's multimedia art works have been exhibited in numerous exhibitions in the UK, the US, South Africa, Sweden, Switzerland, Ukraine, and Italy. She has won the first ever Sky Academy Arts Scholarship (2011), and the $20,000 Special Prize in the 2017 Future Generation Prize in Kyiv, which led to her work Mutumia being shown at the Vienna Biennale the same year. Her work has been described as using "layered methods of storytelling" to explore cultural roots and identity and "transient middle points and passages of migration". It deals with "the subject of frailty and belief systems", "questions the misrepresentation of the female and the Black body in society and culture", and "recast[s the female nude] as a site of power and heroism".

== Filmography ==
- 2016 Dear Mr Shakespeare, commissioned by the British Council and the GREAT Britain Campaign to commemorate 400 years since William Shakespeare’s death; selected for the 2017 Sundance Film Festival.
- 2011 The Pendle Witch Child, BBC4, presented by Simon Armitage, directed by Ros Ereira, animated by Phoebe Boswell.
- 2010 Sorry To Hear You Impaled Yourself on the Roof of Edinburgh College of Art, commissioned and produced by 12foot6, directed and animated by Phoebe Boswell, story told by Andrew Morgan.
- 2009 The Girl With Stories In Her Hair, commissioned by the National Gallery, produced by Central St Martins College of Art, written, directed, performed and animated by Phoebe Boswell, music composed by Andres Franco Medina-Mora.
- 2009 Bunty, written, directed and animated by Phoebe Boswell

== Exhibitions ==
=== Selected group exhibitions ===
- 2021 Do We Muse On The Sky Or Remember The Sea, Prospect.5:Yesterday We Said Tomorrow
- 2017 Mutumia (larger scale), Future Generation Prize, Kyiv, and Venice Biennale
- 2017 Being Her(e), The Old Fort and the Women's Jail Galleries, Johannesburg
- 2016 Stranger In The Village, 1:54 NY Contemporary African Art Fair, Brooklyn
- 2016 Mutumia, Biennale of Moving Images, Centre d’Art Contemporain, Geneva
- 2015 The Matter of Memory, multimedia-installation, Göteborg International Biennial for Contemporary Art
- 2014 The Matter of Memory, multimedia-installation, Carroll/Fletcher Gallery
- 2014 Trade Roots, Kristin Hjellegjerde Gallery, London
- 2012 Smile for London, animation collaboration with Kate Tempest on the London Underground
- 2011 Royal Society of Portrait Painters Annual Exhibition, Mall Galleries
- 2010 Curiouser and Curiouser, curated by Rita Parente, Old Vic Tunnels {www.submit2gravity.com}
- 2009 Moot, C4RD, Centre For Recent Drawing, London [www.c4rd.org.uk]
- 2009 Kunskog, curated by Stuart Pearson Wright, Five Hundred Dollars Gallery, London {www.kunskog.com}
- 2007 Imagining Ourselves, International Museum of Women, Los Angeles
- 2005 Young Collectors Party - Exhibit 05, Bonhams Bond Street, London
- 2005 Royal Academy Summer Show, Royal Academy, London
- 2005 Slade Summer Show, University College, London
- 2004 TEN, Ad hoc Gallery, London
- 2004 Paint London, Candid Arts Trust, London
- 2003 Studio/Show, Hunter Studios, New York

=== Solo exhibitions ===
2019

- The Space Between Things, Autograph, London, 2019.
- Upcoming, Göteborgs Konsthall, Göteborg, Sweden.

2018

- She Summons an Army, EXPO Chicago
- The Lizards Within Us, fourFOLD at Enclave, Deptford
- Take Me to the Lighthouse, Sapar Contemporary, New York

2017

- For Every Real Word Spoken, Tiwani Contemporary

2007

- REPRESENT, Al Riwaq Gallery, Bahrain www.alriwaqartspace.com
- Bahrainona, Bahrain National Museum, Bahrain

== Awards ==
- 2021 - Lumière Award of the Royal Photographic Society.
- 2017 - winner, $20,000 Special Prize by the Future Generation Art Prize at the 2017 Venice Biennale
- 2012 - £30,000 Sky Academy Arts Scholarship
