= Anisa Morridadi =

British entrepreneur and activist

- Awards: British Empire Medal (returned)

Anisa Morridadi BEM (née Haghdadi; born April 1990) is a British social entrepreneur and social rights activist. Since the start of 2013, she has worked as founder and CEO of 'youth engagement' agency Beatfreeks.

== Early life and education ==
Morridadi was born and raised in the Northfield district of in Birmingham, England, attending King Edwards VI Five Ways School, before graduating from Aston University in 2012 with a Bachelor of Science degree in Business and Management.

== Career ==
In 2005, aged 15, Morridadi set up her first social enterprise Strictly Street, a dance class at a YMCA Centre. In 2013, she co-founded Class Careers with Christos Orthodoxou, a company which connected school leavers directly to employers through live webinars.

She has since co-founded Fifteen Minute Trainer Ltd, Identity Dance Project Canis Major, and Beatfreeks - an award-winning social enterprise engaging young people in arts, training and leadership opportunities.

As part of Beatfreeks, Morridadi set up Free Radical in June 2017 with lead producer and poet Amerah Saleh, to focus on "arts activism and storytelling".

Between June 2016 and May 2020, she was also a Director for GirlDreamer, a Birmingham-based female empowerment organisation.

In 2018, Morridadi backed the West Midlands Combined Authority's failed bid for Channel 4 to relocate from London to the region. She was one of 82 high-profile creatives, led by regional mayor Andy Street, to put their names to an open letter urging Channel 4 to invest in the West Midlands. In October 2018, it was announced the bid had been won by the city of Leeds.

== Awards ==
In 2012, after being awarded the Birmingham Young Professional of The Year's 'Aspiring Talent Award', Haghdadi was invited to sit on the Birmingham Future Commission.

In 2013, she was awarded a British Empire Medal for services to education and young people.

In 2022 Beatfreeks went through restructuring, removing the arts programmes to focus on FMCGs

In 2015, Morridadi was awarded Sky Academy Arts Scholarship for Creative Producing out of 1000+ applications to set up Doink which collects and communicates data in creative ways to help people make better decisions.

In 2016, Morridadi was recognised as one of 50 New Radicals "who are actively changing their communities for the better" by NESTA and The Observer and was celebrated on the front page of The Observer New Review on Sunday 10 July 2016. In the same year, Anisa and Beatfreeks produced a Data Rave to engage young people in the run up the United Kingdom's EU membership referendum.

In July 2016, she was awarded an Honorary Doctorate from Aston University. In the same month, she delivered a TEDx talk in Birmingham about her work, where she spoke about "rejecting the Western idea of success".

In May 2018, she was included in BirminghamLive's 30 Under 30 initiative, "showcasing the 30 most inspiring individuals across the city".

In June 2020, Morridadi returned a British Empire Medal in protest of the history of the British Empire and its ongoing legacy in the British Honours system, saying "If this is power, you can have it back".
