= Nancy Durrant =

British culture journalist and broadcast

Nancy Durrant is a British culture journalist and broadcaster. From February 2020 to March 2024 she was the Culture Editor of the Evening Standard in London; previously she worked for many years as an art critic and Arts Commissioning Editor for The Times. She has presented on the BBC Culture Show, contributed to Channel 4 News, Sky News, The Today Programme, Front Row, Times Radio and LBC. During her time at the Standard she wrote, programmed and presented Cultural Capital, a ten-minute weekly culture programme on the Evening Standard's YouTube channel including the popular 60 Second Film Review. She has been a judge for the South Bank Show Awards, the Catlin Art Prize and Sky Arts Ignition Futures Fund. She is referenced in the Rose Wylie painting PV Windows & Floorboards 2011, featured in the film by Adolfo Doring. A terracotta portrait by Jon Edgar was exhibited at Yorkshire Sculpture Park in 2013 as part of the Sculpture Series Heads exhibition. The sitting was documented in The Times.

== Film ==
- Nancy Durrant review of 2010 Bold Tendencies Sculpture Exhibition
- Nancy Durrant on Robert Hughes; Channel4 News 7.8.12
- Nancy Durrant/Julian Spalding/Jon Snow on Damien Hirst; Channel4 News 28.3.12
