= Tom Smith (artist) =

American painter

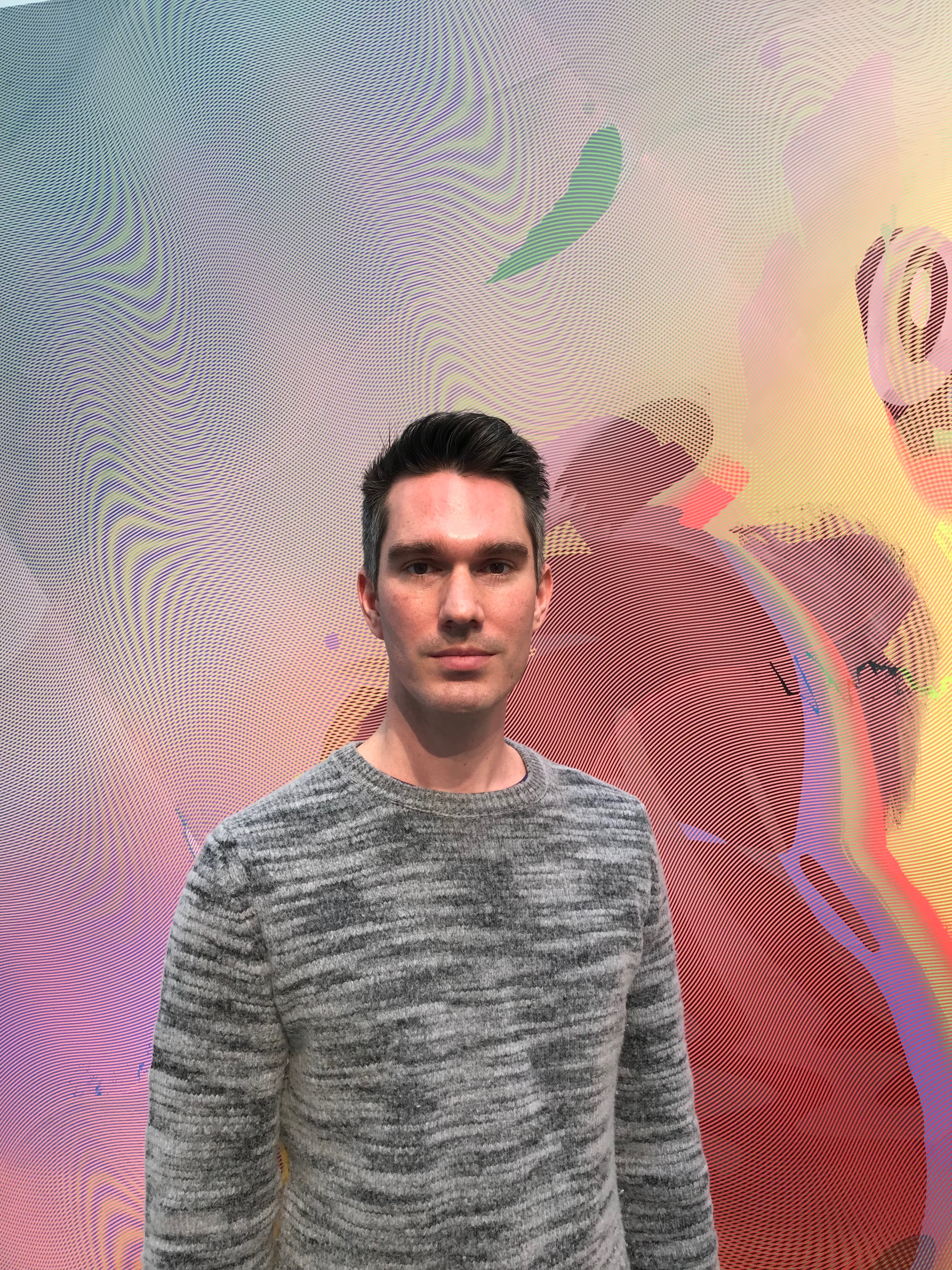
- Smith with Airglow at the Olsen Gruin Gallery in 2017
- Born: Thomas Joseph Smith; December 10, 1984; Pennsylvania, United States
- Education: Maryland Institute College of Art
- Known for: Painting
- Website: www.tomsmithart.com

Thomas Joseph Smith (born December 10, 1984) is an artist who specializes in painting, sculpting, and video. His works have been shown in cities such as New York City, Taipei, Sydney and Rio de Janeiro. Early in his career he created illustrations for the New York Times Op Ed. page, How China Got Religion, under the alias Thomas Jay.

== Early life and education ==
Tom Smith was born Thomas Joseph Smith on December 10, 1984, in Pennsylvania. Smith is the middle of three children, and was primarily raised in Elkton, Maryland. Smith’s mother was a craft artist who later became a web designer, and his father worked in a chemical plant in Wilmington, DE.

Smith attended Maryland Institute College of Art (MICA), where he majored in illustration, and also became interested in colors, inspired by the artists Josef Albers and James Turrell. Furthermore, following his undergraduate at MICA, Smith spent a semester abroad in France, attending Centre pour l'art et la culture in Aix en Provence. Subsequently, Smith traveled to New York where he would go to the School of Visual Arts for his graduate school.

== Career ==
Tom Smith is a painter, sculptor, and video artist who exhibits a strong technological influence that he describes as “digital output”.

In 2009, Tom Smith experimented with collages of found superhero/comic images by taking the pictures and slicing them into tiny strips to combine characters. Due to the limitations of this technique, he instead began painting his own pictures on paper and combining them together. Currently, Smith’s work is a culmination of this technique of visual effects through the combination of imagery, described as “viewing a scene through a filter."

Smith’s first notable exhibition was Double Vision in Brooklyn in 2009, followed by Making Strange featured in Spring Break Art Show in 2016 in Brooklyn and Heavenly Bodies in New York City in 2014. Heavenly Bodies was an exhibit in which Tom Smith showcased his collages and multimedia artworks. These collages were inspired by his time in Brazil and Iceland. Smith’s latest and most significant exhibit was Swimming in My Head in New York City, at Olsen Gruin Gallery, which he describes as the “most involved” exhibition.

Swimming in My Head is the most involved exhibition I've ever put together and houses one year of painting (13 total). It also marks my transition from collage work to painting on canvas which has unlimited the possibilities of optical patterns and illusions within my paintings through silkscreen processes.

While exhibiting his work, Tom Smith worked at Two Palms Studios, in which he created his work. Two Palms also worked with many different artists, and Smith described his time there as being a transformative and significant one.

== Public service and arts activism ==
Smith is a co-creator of DragOn, an annual drag and costume ball. DragOn focuses on raising money for the LGBTQ and HIV/AIDS community in New York City. Smith is passionately committed to advocacy in the LGBTQ community. DragOn was founded to create a space for people to experiment with drag and creative expression through costume.

Each year, the event is DJ'ed by Occupy the Disco and has a unique theme, with past themes including: The Dollhouse (2014), Glamatron (2015), High Society (2016), and Ms. Mayhem (2017). The highlight of the event is a runway show for which guests are nominated to walk and compete. One guest is crowned the winner by guest judges such as Milk (of RuPaul’s Drag Race), Iconic stylist and designer, Patricia Field, Editor at Large of Vogue, Hamish Bowles, Real Housewife of New York, Dorinda Medley, and American journalist, Michael Musto. Since 2012, DragOn has raised $100,000, with 100% of proceeds going to charities like, GMHC, the world’s first and leading provider of HIV/AIDS prevention, care, and advocacy.

== Selected works ==
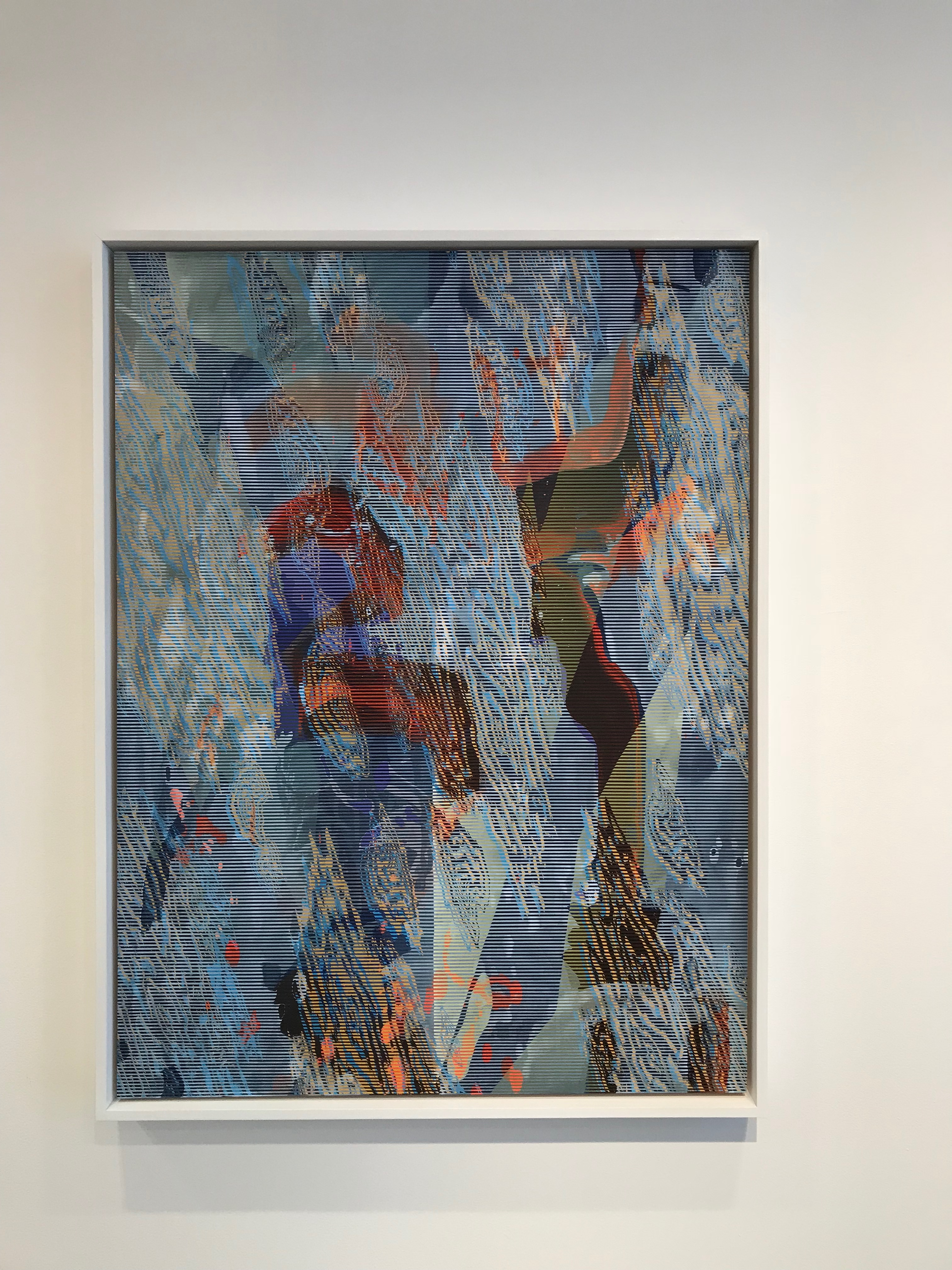
Ghost Door 2017 at the Olsen Gruin Gallery

- Double Vision, collage of superhero images, exhibited at Eyelevel BQE, Brooklyn, NY (2009)
- Red Pulse, tiny strips of painted paper, cut and collaged on wood panel (2011)
- Delusions, an installation that included paintings and sculptures as well as sound installation by Gryphon Rue (2013)
- The Knot, an exhibition in partnership with partner Jonathan Rosen to promote marriage equality abroad, Sydney, Australia (2015)
- Making Strange, employed set design tricks to create a playful environment in which to exhibit psychedelic paintings (2016)
- Airglow, Tom Smith's largest work, part of the exhibition Swimming in My Head at Olsen Gruin, NY (2017)

== Awards ==
- Atlantic Center for the Arts, Artist in residence, 2014
- Largo das Artes, Artist in residence, Rio de Janeiro, 2014
- The Drawing Center, Viewing Program, 2010 – 2014
- Maryland Distinguished Scholar 2002-2006

== Films ==
- Siren Song, 2014
- DragOn: The Dollhouse promo video, Producer and Art Direction, 2014
- Tamala and the Volcano, 2015
- DragOn: High Society promo video, Director, in collaboration with Deven Green, 2016
- DragOn: Ms. Mayhem promo video, Director, 2017
