= Sky Academy Arts Scholarship =

Sky Academy Arts Scholarship was a scholarship award for artists, launched in 2011 by Sky and run in conjunction with IdeasTap and Hiive (Now Screenskills). The annual scholarship supported selected artists and creative individuals under the age of 30 with a £30,000 bursary and mentor support to help them develop to the next stage of their careers. It was part of the Sky Academy programme from 2013 until its final year in 2016.

== History ==
The Sky Academy Arts Scholarship originally started as the Sky Arts Ignition:Futures Fund in 2011, before becoming part of the new Sky Academy in 2013. Applicants were required to complete an application detailing the project they would complete while they were on the scholarship, and with around a 1000 applicants a year this would be whittled down for a panel of art experts to make the final decision. The panel changed each year and former members have included Godfrey Worsdale (former Director of BALTIC Contemporary Art Gallery); Louise Jeffreys (Director of Arts, Barbican); Radio presenter Jo Whiley; Nancy Durrant (Arts Commissioning Editor for The Times); Iwona Blazwick (Director of Whitechapel Gallery); Cam Blackwood (Music producer).

Melvyn Bragg, who was an ambassador at the Sky Academy stated "I genuinely believe that the Sky Arts Scholarships are a substantial and far-sighted contribution to the best arts practice in this country, and already we see tremendous talents being encouraged and developed as a result of it" and in an interview with the Radio Times he said about the scholarship "People seem to think the arts just pop out of the ground. They don’t. Young people need support, and our scheme should be replicated all over the place. The National Theatre, the Royal Shakespeare Company and the Royal Opera House all get whacking great subsidies from us as taxpayers. Why don’t each of them sponsor five or ten scholarships a year?" The winners of the scholarships were announced at the South Bank Sky Arts Awards until 2016 when the scholarship was dropped.

Winners of the scholarship have included Mark Simpson who went onto win the South Bank Sky Arts Award for Classical Music which he wrote while on his scholarship, while Sabrina Mahfouz whose Edinburgh Festival play Chef was written during her scholarship and won the Fringe First Award.

== Past Scholars ==
Scholar Name	Discipline	Year Awarded	Scholarship Highlights
Phoebe Boswell	Visual Arts	2011	First recipient of the scholarship.
Daisy Evans	Opera Director	2011	Developed Silent Opera theatre company which she is the artistic director of.
Laurence Payot	Performance Arts	2012	Developed project 1 in a Million You.
Drew Roper	Animator	2012	Developed Yamination Studios.
Felix Mortimer	Theatre director	2012	Produced The Trial with RETZ theatre company (along with previous recipient Daisy Evans).
Aakash Odedra	Dancer and choreographer	2013	Developed Murmur.
Mark Simpson	Music	2013	2015 South Bank Sky Awards - Classical Music Award for work The Immortal
Sabrina Mahfouz	Poetry and Playwright	2013	Fringe First Award for scholarship project Chef and was nominated for the Carol Tambor Best of Edinburgh Award.
Sisi Lu	Digital artist	2013	Produced The Age of Digital / Analogue film.
Kate Whiley	Creative producer	2013	
Eleesha Drennan	Dancer and choreographer	2014	Produced the show Channel Rose.
David Shearing	Theatre designer	2014	Produced The Weather Machine in conjunction with West Yorkshire Playhouse and stage@leeds.
James Lomax	Visual Arts	2014	Youngest recipient of scholarship.
Ollie Howell	Jazz drummer and composer	2014	First Jazz artist to receive the scholarship. Produced his album Self Identity was created while on the scholarship.
Tom Mcdonagh	Creative producer	2014	
Sarah Maple	Visual Artist	2015	
Anisa Haghdadi	Creative Producer	2015	
Adebayo Fakos	Music Producer	2015	
Jonnie Bayfield	Writer and Performer	2015	Formed Caligula's Alibi and co-wrote an adaption of Dostoevsky's Idiot. Also wrote his first novel Pleasureland.
Kevin Gaffney	Artist	2015	First Irish recipient of the scholarship. Produced short film A Numbness in the Mouth.
Gearoid O’Dea	Visual Arts	2016	Produced his first solo exhibition The Had, The Have and the Should.
Sarah Grant	Film Production	2016	Produced the short film The Magic Word and was the first Scot to receive the reward.
Yinka Ayinde (aka PureYinkz)	Creative Production	2016	Produce a reimagined 21st century version of cult TV show Kenan and Kel.
Jasdeep Singh Degun	Music	2016	Produced his debut album 'Anomaly'.
Caitlin McLeod	Theatre and Comedy	2016	Set up the female focused writing company The Coterie.

== See also ==
- List of European art awards
