= Fleur du Mal =

Lingerie and ready-to-wear brand

- Industry: Apparel
- Founded: 2012; 14 years ago
- Founder: Jennifer Zuccarini
- Headquarters: U.S.
- Key people: Jennifer Zuccarini
- Products: Women's clothing, lingerie, swimwear
- Website: FleurduMal.com

Fleur du Mal is a lingerie, clothing and beauty retailer, founded in 2012 by Jennifer Zuccarini.

Between 2017 and 2019, Fleur du Mal opened a boutique in SoHo, New York City, and Los Angeles, California. In August 2025, Fleur du Mal expanded into its second New York City location, opening a boutique in Williamsburg, Brooklyn.

== Founder's background ==
The founder, Jennifer Zuccarini, grew up in Toronto, Canada, and later moved to New York, where she lived for almost 14 years. She previously stated that her parents were her inspiration for entering the fashion field. She studied Fine Arts in Montreal, after which she completed another degree in Fashion Design at Fashion Institute of Technology. Zuccarini worked at Nanette Lepore, an online store until 2005 when she was planning a new business with her partner, Nanette Lepore. In 2008. she started working for Victoria's Secret as a lingerie designer.

== Company history ==
After working at Kiki and Victoria's Secret, Zuccarini created Fleur du Mal, a lingerie brand with items meant to be worn every day. Zuccarini took the name from a collection of poems by Charles Baudelaire, Les Fleurs du mal ("the flowers of evil"). Zuccarini felt that Baudelaire was a good inspiration for the brand, as he was a "decadent and tormented artist, a true dandy, who spent everything he had on clothing, opium, and women". The primary goal for Zuccarini was to change people's views towards lingerie, as Zuccarini felt that lingerie played an important role as a part of women's wardrobe and should not be limited to special events such as a date.

In 2017 Fleur du Mal launched a ready-to-wear label. During the same year the newspaper Observer stated that Fleur du Mal had become Hollywood's go-to lingerie line. In 2019 The Independent named the brand one of the "65 best online clothing stores in the US".

== Products ==
As of 2019, Fleur du Mal offers lingerie, women's ready-to-wear fashion, and swims. The brand has offered special collections including "ESSENTIELS", "SPRING", "RESORT", "BRIDAL", and "BACK IN STOCK".

From 2015 to 2018, Fleur du Mal launched a number of conceptual collections.

1. ‘Love is a contact sport’ was the first lingerie collection released in the spring of 2015.
2. 'Do not disturb' was the second collection launched in the fall of 2015.
3. ‘Fleur du Mal X Playboy was a collaboration of 17 products including bras and panties sets, body suits, robes, and bunny ears, available in various colors, prints, and fabrics. The collection was launched on November 20, 2015.
4. 'The velvet underground' was released in the fall of 2016. The concept of this collection was to crush on everything velvet for fall.
5. 'Tropical disco hustle' was a collection released in 2017 for vacation. 'Baby, it is getting hot' was the main thesis of this collection.
6. In 2018, the brand launched its Fuller Cup collection, ranging from size DD to G.
7. 'Spring fever' was launched in the spring of 2019. The concept of the collection is to make a connection with lingerie and flowers.

== Marketing and collaboration ==
Jennifer Zuccarini chose to utilize mobile pop-up shops, as she felt they model the modern customers' shopping habits and allow the company to expand its international presence quicker than only holding specific physical stores. Fleur du Mal launched its first mobile pop-up shop in New York in November 2012. Then hosted another one in Los Angeles in February 2013.

Fleur du Mal partnered with Playboy in 2015. The entire collaboration had 17 products including bras and panties sets, body suits, robes, and bunny ears, available in various colors, prints, and fabrics with a Playboy touch. Products could be purchased online at diverse retailers like Shopbob, Fleur du Mal, and Net-a-Porter.

In June 2017, Fleur du Mal launched a year-round gallery "The Peep Show", located inside the NYC boutique at 175 Mott Street. The exhibition featured artist Fahren Feingold and carried the label's full fall 2017 collection. Zuccarini claimed that it's important to collaborate with artists who really understand the essence of Fleur du Mal: powerful, provocative, and feminine.

In November 2017, the perfume brand Kilian collaborated with Fleur du Mal. The concept of this collaboration was to use microcapsules to bring Kilian's fragrance to underwear items. This collection included a semi-transparent bodysuit, a night set including a camisole and shorts, a kimono, and accessories sets.

== See also ==
- Zara (retailer)
- Acne Studios
- Victoria's Secret
- COS (Collection Of Style)
- Club Monaco
