= Jasdeep Singh Degun =

British Asian sitarist and composer

Jasdeep Singh Degun (born 9 September 1991) is a British sitar player and composer from Leeds. He is signed to the Real World Records label, on which he released his debut album, Anomaly. In May 2022, he became artist-in-residence at Opera North, and in 2024, was made the first Innovate Fellow at the Royal Northern College of Music. Degun is the first sitar player to be awarded a Royal Philharmonic Society Best Instrumentalist Award.

== Early life ==
Jasdeep Singh Degun was introduced to Indian classical music at primary school and began training in vocal music with Shrimati Gunwant Kaur. He was in the school choir and learnt piano. At 15, Degun started learning to play the sitar under Ustad Dharambir Singh MBE, a pupil of Ustad Vilayat Khan. Growing up, Degun was a member of Tarang and the South Asian Music Youth Orchestra, established by Dharambir Singh, which brought together classical musical traditions from across India.

In 2011, Degun featured in the three-part BBC Two series Goldie's Band: By Royal Appointment which culminated in a performance in Buckingham Palace before Prince Harry. As a participant of the programme, Degun was supported by mentors Guy Chambers, Soweto Kinch, Ms Dynamite, Steve Abbott and Cerys Matthews.

In 2014, Degun completed a BA in music at SOAS University London, and in 2016, was an international scholar for six months at the ITC Sangeet Research Academy in Kolkata, India.

== Career ==
Degun works as a composer, concert performer and music director. He regularly performs solo Indian classical concerts accompanied by a tabla player, with chamber ensembles – including the Scottish Ensemble – and with orchestras. In 2022, Degun performed at the Royal Commonwealth Service in the presence of King Charles III at Westminster Abbey, aired live on BBC One.

=== Real World Records ===
In 2016, Degun was awarded a Sky Academy Arts Scholarship to work on a contemporary and classical album, Anomaly. As part of the scholarship, he was mentored by multi-instrumentalist and producer, Nitin Sawhney, who co-wrote and performed a track on the album. Anomaly features 33 musicians, including sitarist Roopa Panesar, South Indian percussionist Pirashanna Thevarajah, esraj violinist Kirpal Panesar, and a 16-piece string ensemble.

Degun signed to Real World Records in 2021 and released Anomaly in May 2022. The album was recorded in concert with a nine-piece ensemble in July 2022; the tour started at London's Kings Place on 14 May 2022. The album went on tour with a further series of concerts in 2023.

=== Opera North ===
In 2017, Degun was music director and composer for India's Children: Partition, a collaborative project between Opera North and South Asian Arts-uk in commemoration of the 70th anniversary of the partition of India and Pakistan. In 2019, Degun was commissioned by Opera North to write Arya: Concerto for Sitar and Orchestra, which premiered in Huddersfield Town Hall in February 2020. In May 2022, Degun was made artist-in-residence at Opera North.

In 2022, Degun was composer, performer and co-music director with early music specialist Laurence Cummings in Orpheus: Music by Claudio Monteverdi and Jasdeep Singh Degun, commissioned by Opera North and South Asian Arts-uk. Orpheus premiered at Leeds Grand Theatre on 14 October 2022. It was rated the best of all concert and operas of 2022 by Fiona Maddocks, with The Guardian.

== Awards and nominations ==
- 2016: Yuva Sangeet Ratna Musician of the Year, The National Indian Arts Awards, Milap
- 2016: Sky Academy Arts Scholarship, announced at the South Bank Sky Arts Awards
- 2020: Nominee for an 'Eastern Eye Award for Traditional Music', in the Arts, Culture and Theatre Awards (ACTAs)
- 2022: 'Outstanding Achievement in Opera Award', The Critics' Circle Music Awards for Orpheus: Music by Claudio Monteverdi and Jasdeep Singh Degun
- 2023: 'Best Newcomer', Songlines Music Awards
- 2023: Nominee for 'Best Album (Asia and Pacific category)', Songlines Music Awards
- 2023: Art and Culture Award, Asian Achievers Awards
- 2023: Nominee for an Ivor Novello Award for 'Best Stage Work', The Ivors Classical Awards
- 2023: 'Best Stage Production', Asian Media Awards, for Orpheus: Music by Claudio Monteverdi and Jasdeep Singh Degun
- 2024: 'Instrumentalist Award', Royal Philharmonic Society Music Awards
- 2024: Nominee for 'Large Scale Composition', Royal Philharmonic Society Music Awards

== Works and releases ==
- The Bridge for sitar and string quartet, commissioned by zerOclassikal (2017)
- Arya: Concerto for Sitar and Orchestra, commissioned by Opera North (2019)
- Anomaly, album released on Real World Records (May 2022)
  - "Veer", single released on Real World Records (December 2021)
  - "Ulterior Motives", single released on Real World Records (March 2022)
  - "Sajanava", single released on Real World Records (April 2022)
- Orpheus: Music by Claudio Monterverdi and Jasdeep Singh Degun, opera commissioned by Opera North and South Asian Arts-uk (2022)
- "Aapki Khushi", single released on Real World Records (March 2023)
- "Cycles 15" (stylised as Cycles^{15}), commissioned by Scottish Ensemble (January 2023)
- "Lament", single released on Real World Records (February 2024)
- Jogkauns, album released on Real World Records (November 2025)
