= Fahren Feingold =

21st-century feminist artist

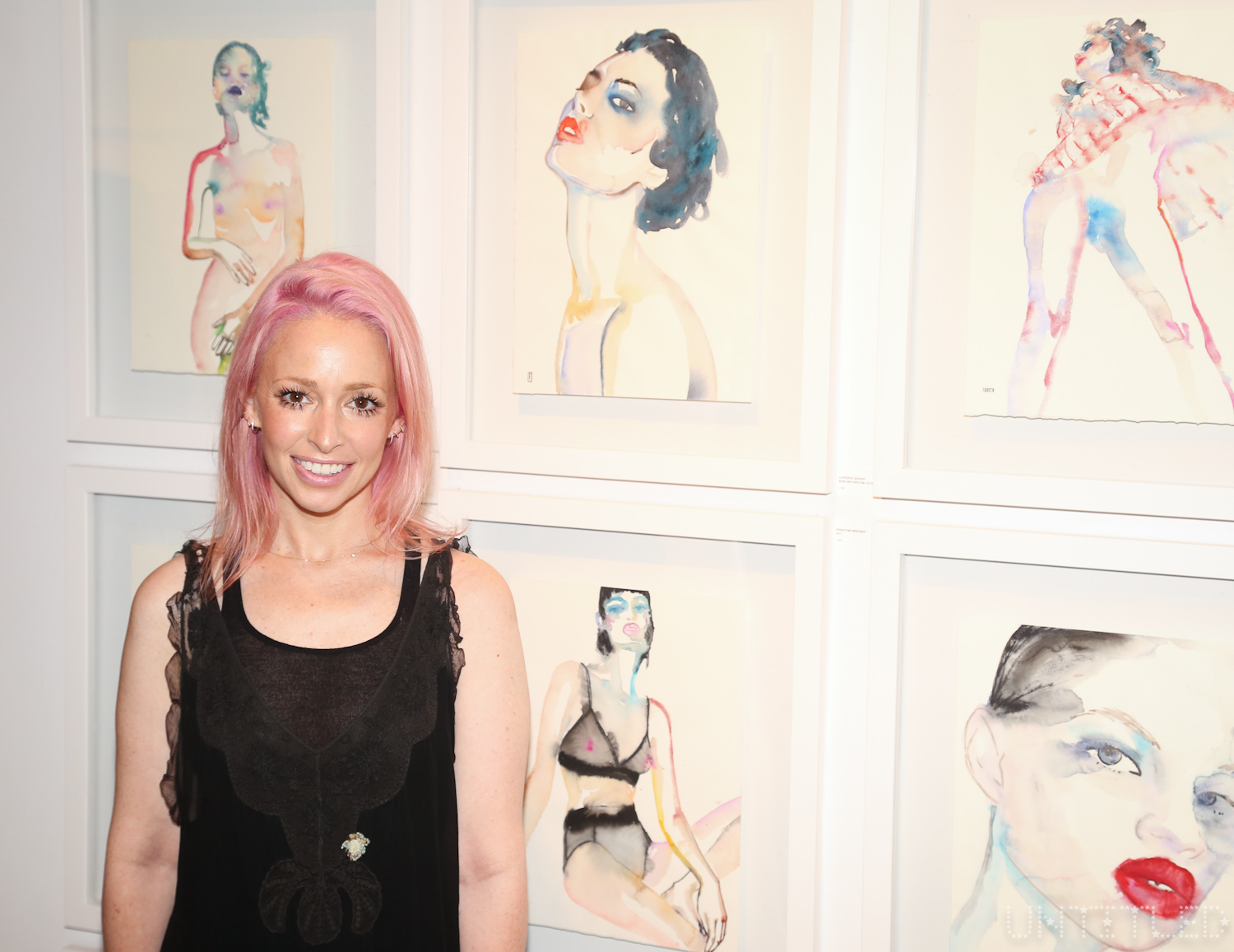
- Born: September 19, 1980; San Francisco, California, U.S.
- Died: September 26, 2023 (aged 43)
- Education: Parsons School of Design, Glasgow School of Art
- Patron: The Untitled Space

Fahren Feingold (September 19, 1980 – September 26, 2023) was an American artist and fashion designer. She was known for feminist watercolors often depicting female nudes, painted using a wet-on-wet technique. Represented by The Untitled Space in New York City, she exhibited frequently there and at galleries elsewhere in the U.S. and internationally.

== Early life and fashion design ==
Born in San Francisco, Feingold and her family moved in 1981 to Los Angeles. Showing great artistic talent from childhood, she won a "best artist" as a high school senior at Crossroads School for Arts & Sciences in Santa Monica. At 17 she moved to New York where she studied at the Parsons School of Design. She earned a BFA in illustration at Parsons and Glasgow School of Art, and went on to work as a fashion designer for brands such as Ralph Lauren, DKNY, l'Agence, Nicole Miller, Splendid, J.Crew, and Chaser.

== Artistic work ==
In 2016, Feingold transitioned from fashion design to fine art. She said she found fashion "no longer creatively satisfying" and "felt taken advantage of by brand owners who wanted us to work long hours in return for little pay and even less kindness."

Her watercolors often explored femininity and the female form, sensuality, and empowerment. Often featuring female nudes, her watercolors referenced imagery from French erotica of the early 20th century, American magazines from the 1970s and '80s, and her own photographs. A skilled portraitist, she also acknowledged the deep influence of Egon Schiele.

Nick Knight discovered Feingold's artwork and commissioned her in 2016 to create SHOWstudio illustrations for Paris Fashion Week.

Participation in a 2016 group show called "LIFEFORCE," depicting a feminist vision of the future and curated by Kelsey and Rémy Bennett, led to a long association with and representation by The Untitled Space, a New York City gallery founded by Indira Cesarine and focusing on feminist art, where she was featured in more than 30 exhibitions. In 2017, months before her debut solo show at The Untitled Space, Vogue profiled Feingold and named her "a trailblazing artist on a meteoric rise."

Opening my eyes to the beauty and love that exists within me and around, my paintings act as a quiet dagger of truth, exposing the beauty of the feminine form from the female gaze, emphasizing the female body as a great thing to behold, free of judgement and objectification. My paintings of the female figure expands the footprint of women painted by women, celebrating sisterhood and empowering female themes.

– Fahren Feingold in GirlTalkHQ

Feingold's work often took on subject matter seldom addressed in art. Two Feingold exhibits in 2018 directly addressed women's issues. "The Peep Show" was, in Feingold's words, "an attempt to undo the centuries of censorship, shaming and patriarchal politics that clouds the simple beauty of a naked body." "GOLDEN TOUCH" focused on menstruation: "We should be talking about it like purity, and godliness, and gold," she said.

Outside New York, Feingold exhibited in Paris, London, Los Angeles, Miami, Tokyo and elsewhere.

Feingold died of cancer on September 26, 2023.

== Exhibitions ==
Feingold's earliest exhibitions were in group shows in 2016, such as "Moving Kate" curated by Nick Knight at SHOWstudio in London and The Mass (Tokyo), "Red Hot Wicked" at Studio C Gallery in Los Angeles, and "The Vulgar" curated by Judith Clark and Adam Phillips at the Barbican in London.

After her self-titled solo debut exhibition at The Untitled Space in 2017, she continued to exhibit there in more solo shows: "GOLDEN TOUCH" in 2018, "NO END TO LOVE" in 2020, and in 2021 "High On Life" and her solo show in a physical space, "WET DREAMS," all curated by Indira Cesarine. In 2019 the cover of The Untitled Magazine's ART Issue featured her portrait of Kate Moss. "LIVING FOR LOVE," an online solo exhibit and auction supporting women's mental health nonprofit SeekHer, took place in 2023 and constituted her final exhibition.

Other exhibitions included the solo exhibition "The Peep Show" presented in collaboration with The Untitled Space and brand Fleur Du Mal in New York and solo, duo and group exhibitions in Miami, the Hamptons, and online. The Untitled Magazine featured Feingold's artwork on several of its collector print editions.
