= Grace Graupe-Pillard =

American painter

- Born: Washington Heights, New York City
- Education: City College of New York; Art Students League
- Known for: Feminism
- Style: Painting

Grace Graupe-Pillard is an American artist from New York City, United States. She is known for her feminist stance during the 1970s. Later her paintings dealt with wider political issues, such as the Iraq War.

== Early life and career ==
Grace Graupe was born in Washington Heights, New York City, the daughter of Else Graupe, a Dressmaker/Designer and Gerhard Graupe, an Architect who was lead architect for Herman Jessor and Co. building middle-income housing in NYC such as Penn South, Co-op City, Van Cortlandt Park /Amalgamated, Rochdale Village, Seward Park Housing, etc. Both greatly influenced her work. She was also influenced by individuality, or a lack thereof, due to having a twin sister Florence and believed people should look past appearances. She attended the High School of Music and Art and the City College of New York where she earned her bachelor's degree in history and political science. She briefly went on to CUNY Graduate Center in Russian Area Studies which she abandoned to go back to art school studying drawing with Marshal Glasier at the Art Students League in Manhattan where she received a George Bridgman Scholarship juried by Philip Guston.

== Artworks ==
Graupe-Pillard is a painter, public artist, educator and makes videos, having exhibited artwork in many venues including Cheim & Read Gallery, New York City, Carl Hammer Gallery, Chicago, The Proposition, New York City, Hal Bromm Gallery, New York City, Rupert Ravens Contemporary and Aljira-A Center For Contemporary Art in Newark, New Jersey, etc. She has participated in group exhibitions at The Noyes Museum, P.S. 1, Bass Museum, Indianapolis Museum, The Maier Museum, The Aldrich Museum, The Drawing Center, The Hunterdon Museum, The Frist Center, and The National Academy Museum. Her photos and videos have been presented at Lars von Trier’s Gesamt, Warsaw Jewish Film Festival, Scope Miami, Scope London, Art Chicago, Art Fem. TV, Cologne OFF, Found Footage & SHOAH, etc.

=== Early works ===
Upon returning to New Jersey in 1974 after living in New Mexico for six years where she met and married Stephen Pillard, she joined the feminist movement and began painting men and women who were not typically seen as "attractive," and not fitting into the art historical canon of the "nude," i.e.: focusing on women with stretch marks. Throughout the 70's, 80's and 90's Grace Graupe-Pillard drew nude figures not of models but of neighbors, friends, and other everyday people. Her subjects were often middle-aged with middle-aged physiques, and her renditions of them were not primarily meant to be sensual or sexually appealing. Graupe-Pillard said, “My work since 1975 has dealt with feminist issues beginning with paintings of large frontal nudes of men and women of various ages who did not “fit into” the dictates of the “gaze” of the male-dominated art history/museum network”.

From 1984 to 1994 Graupe-Pillard worked with a traditional medium in a non-traditional way creating large pastel/cutout-canvas installations. She found that pastels, which have often been thought of as a woman's tool to be used for woman's “delicate” subjects, was the perfect medium for her to document the often difficult “art of survival” in NYC. She also found that there was an immediacy and directness to using pastels that mimics the speed and excitement of the urban environment with its contradictory elements of squalor and glamour. Graupe-Pillard worked on large pastel drawings of everyday people, including break dancers, pedestrians, and the homeless, to make them appear mythic and heroic. Graupe-Pillard also used these portraits to comment on social issues such as mortality, as seen in the piece Balance/Woman (1989), where the elderly are slowly decaying as younger generations defy the pull of the world. According to Graupe-Pillard, “Power and the abuse of power- such as the conflicts between men and women both on a personal and political level- are ever-present in my consciousness and my artwork.” Contemporary life was chronicled through the creation of large cut-out pieces which were installed on one or more walls. The individuals portrayed in these murals feature diverse juxtapositions of age, sex, class, race, and vocation to produce a "human theater of types, gestures and emotions". (Michael Brenson, The New York Times 3/29/85.) Graupe-Pillard said that she wished to make those people that are quite often “invisible” permanently “visible”. Architectural elements, and fragmented images of American life and culture were also included. Shifts in place and scale, different rhythms, and a richness of color and form produced a sense of the surroundings. The synthesis of figures, portraits, and silhouettes made a statement of how private thoughts and public postures interplay in the metropolis. In the early 1990s she worked on her Silhouette Series employing a wider range of imagery, using silhouettes to serve as a contour framing device for more personal and poetic concepts.

=== War series ===
From 1990 to 1993 Graupe-Pillard created Nowhere To Go - One Family's Experience that dealt with the destructive effects of power in a series which was exhibited at The NJ State Museum and at Rider University, NJ entitled: The Holocaust: Massacre of Innocents. This series consists of large canvases that depict figures of Jewish prisoners that reflect on the experience of her father and paternal grandparents during the Holocaust in Nazi Germany and is a recurring theme in her work. She grew up with the knowledge of her father's pain, which resulted from his inability to save seventy family members during the war. She uses symbolism to comment on the events: rabbits for the medical experimentation, mass genocide, and sweeping speed with which the war grew. She also drew the figures to reflect the propaganda of anti-Semitism during the Holocaust, with hooked noses and pickpocketing hands. Also found in her work are images of gas masks, chain link fences, swastikas, and photos of her grandparents who died there. Graupe-Pillard chose the softness of pastels to create this series, and noted that it was not a medium generally used to depict the harshness of war. Despite her multiple war series, Graupe-Pillard has remarked, “I don’t think art can make a difference. Otto Dix painted the disasters of war, but very few people know of him or have seen his paintings because he’s not a rock star or a media star.” Collections & Exhibitions

Another series entitled MANIPULATION/DISPLACED PAINTINGS 2002–2017 was influenced by 9-11 and the onset of the Iraq war. In a world where terrorism, ethnic cleansing, and cultural upheaval have dominated the news headlines, these paintings focus on the devastating effect of war and its impact on the civilian population. Entitled DISPLACED, this series correlates the displacement of civilians in war-torn countries with a visual disintegration of form, evident in both the creative process and in the final painted product. In each painting, the chaos of cultural disintegration is symbolized by the fragmentation of the picture plane. With repeated editing and” filtering” in computer programs reiterating the filtering of information, she appropriates images from journalistic sources, “blowing apart the reality” of the photograph so that the final result is distilled and disintegrated from its original context, and reduced into unpredictably flatly colored eccentric shapes further emphasizing the fragmentation of form and removal from its original source.

Graupe-Pillard's archival pigment print war series Interventions began in 2003 and focused on overseas wars. Interventions was a union of her mediums of choice, photography and painting, and an advanced use of color manipulation. The collages show a decline of cultural sanctity and suffering due to war. To create Interventions, she used high resolution photos of familiar locations in major cities, including New York City, Baltimore, Newark, and Chicago, and digitally overlaid them with collaged depictions of war, such as car bombings, destroyed buildings, refugees, and soldiers. She used this combination to provoke the idea of war in one's own backyard for viewers.

=== Other works ===
Keyhole Series - 1995–2000.

This body of work deals with photographs collaged directly onto the canvas; the images in these large paintings are scavenged from a vast stockpile of art history books and magazines. They consist of photo reproductions that have already been cropped and altered which are then scanned into the computer and re-cropped and re-altered changing scale and context. Using a simple formal structure - a keyhole and a silhouette, placing appropriated forms within those parameters, Graupe-Pillard creates a dialogue between the physicality of the collaged photo and the illusionism of the painting. As the title implies, the KEYHOLE SERIES is a voyeuristic peek into the many physical and psychological upheavals that occur as we mature and undergo life experiences.

In 2007 Graupe-Pillard also created a series entitled Stop Stealing My Face, a collaboration of reprinted hand-drawn pictures that carry the viewer through the final month of her mother's life in hospice. The photos are from a bedside viewpoint and are reprinted, which prevents viewers from having access to the original documents which shared the same space as her mother's final breaths, a symbolic way of Graupe-Pillard maintaining an intimacy with her mother that the public cannot touch.

Grace Delving Into Art is a photographic series that began in 2012 featuring herself nude, interacting with public art, raising issues of body-image in mature women, performance and voyeurism contributing to a contemporary dialogue on feminism and the artist's body and the merging of the public and private realms.

=== Public art 1992–2004 ===
Grace Graupe-Pillard has received public art commissions from Shearson Lehman American Express, AT&T, Peat Marwick, Wonder Woman Wall at The Port Authority Bus Terminal in New York City, Robert Wood Johnson University Hospital, New Brunswick, New Jersey, and "Celebrating Orange". commissioned for the City of Orange, New Jersey. Public art projects also include commissions from NJ Transit for their new Hudson Bergen Light Rail Transit System at Garfield Station in Jersey City, and 2nd Street Station in Hoboken installed in 2004, as well as an artwork for New Jersey Transit's Aberdeen-Matawan Station in Aberdeen, NJ. In 1995 she was chosen to serve on New Jersey Transit's Transit Arts Committee developing a “Master Plan” that set forth guidelines and approaches for the inclusion of art in their new Hudson-Bergen Light Rail Transit System. She also served as one of the Design Team Leaders for 3 of the stations. In 1998 Ms. Graupe-Pillard was asked to be on the Design team for the planning of artwork to be placed in the Hoboken 2nd St. station.

== Teaching ==
Graupe-Pillard later became an art educator, a career that spanned over forty years working for Monmouth County Parks System (1975–2016) and also directed The Abby Mural Fellowship Workshop at The National Academy Museum and Art School (2003–2010).
