= Lynn Bianchi =

American artist, photographer

Lynn Bianchi (born 1944) is an American fine art photographer and multimedia artist who has shown her work in over thirty solo exhibitions and in museums worldwide, and is best known for her nude photographic series Heavy In White. Born in Pittsburgh, Pennsylvania, Bianchi currently resides in New York City where she is working in the field of video art.

== Collections ==
Bianchi's work resides both in private collections, such as Manfred Heiting's and Edward Norton's, and in museum collections, including the Museum of Fine Arts in Houston, Texas, Brooklyn Museum in New York, Bibliothèque Nationale de France in Paris, Musée Ken Damy in Brescia, Italy, and 21c Museum Hotels in Louisville, Kentucky.
