= Robin Tewes =

American painter

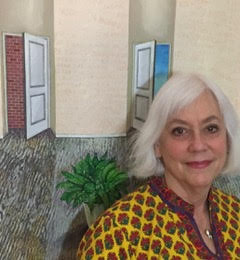
- Artist Robin Tewes in 2018.
- Born: 1950 (age 75–76); Queens, New York, US
- Education: Hunter College
- Known for: Painting
- Style: Narrative, Representational

Robin Tewes (born 1950) is a Queens-born, New York City-based artist, known since the early 1980s for her representational paintings of frozen, narrative-like moments. She has shown her work in numerous solo exhibitions in New York City, as well as nationally and internationally, and exhibited at venues including P.S. 1, the Museum of Modern Art, the Whitney Museum, The Drawing Center, and the Central Academy of Fine Arts (Beijing), among many. Her work has been widely discussed in publications including Artforum, Art in America, ARTnews, Tema Celeste, the New York Times, the Los Angeles Times, and the Village Voice. Tewes was a founding member of the P.S. 122 Painting Association. She has been recognized with a Pollock-Krasner Foundation Fellowship (2015) and Painting Award (2008), an Adolph and Esther Gottlieb Foundation Award (2007), and inclusion in the Smithsonian Archives of American Art in 2016.

Tewes paints everyday people and domestic interiors in a precise, almost deadpan style that Artforum critic Ronny Cohen called "searingly direct" in its presentation of information and emotional impact. She often incorporates subtle, graffiti-like text into her paintings, suggesting pointed or disquieting thoughts, conversations or social commentary on the scene being portrayed. ARTnews Barbara Pollack described Tewes's work as maintaining "an edgy balance between surrealism and soap opera." In addition to her art practice, Tewes has worked as an educator, lecturer, curator and activist.

== Life and career ==
Robin Tewes was born and raised in the working-class Richmond Hill, Queens neighborhood. She was interested in art from an early age and attended the High School of Art and Design in Manhattan, majoring in cartooning. After working and traveling, she attended Hunter College in New York City (BFA, 1978), where her key influences were narrative, representational artists such as Frida Kahlo and Edward Hopper, as well as the Surrealists.

After graduating, Tewes became involved with a group of young artists living and working on the poor-to-working class Lower East Side. Together, they founded the P.S. 122 Painting Association in 1979 and began renting classrooms in the abandoned P.S. 122 school, which they converted into studio spaces. That association, in existence today, evolved into the future Performance Space New York. During that time, Tewes also co-founded the artists collective, Fifth Street Gallery, one of the first on the Lower East Side.

Tewes began publicly exhibiting in 1978. In 1980, she was chosen for a show of young American painters in Caracas, Venezuela, and later for shows at the Grace Borgenicht and Stefanotti galleries, Weatherspoon Art Museum, and Whitney Museum, eventually earning her first major solo show at Josef Gallery (1983). In 1984, New York Times critic William Zimmer noted her "growing New York art world reputation." The attention brought solo exhibitions at the Bill Mayne and John Weber galleries (New York City), Faggionato Fine Arts (London), Art in General, and Rutgers University in the 1990s, and In the 2000s, at Adam Baumgold (New York City), Headbones (Canada), Queens College, Pace University, and Texas A&M University.

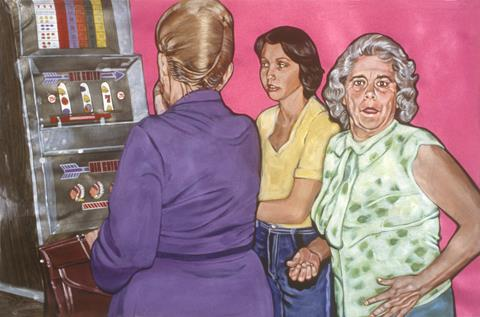
Robin Tewes, Moose Club Gambling, acrylic on paper, 23" x 31," 1978.

Tewes earned her MST in Visual Arts from Pace University in 2012. She has taught at colleges and universities around New York City since 1996, including Parsons School of Design, the Bard College Graduate Program, Hunter College, and Pace University (2005–2017). She is currently teaching at Buckley School in Manhattan, where she has taught since 2015. Tewes has a son, Dylan Marcus, who is a sound technology director in New York City.

== Work ==
In her early work, Tewes portrayed candid, accessible narrative moments, using snapshots of family and friends to represent the lives of people that critics observed, "rarely appear in fine art." Working on paper, she often collaged patterned wrapping paper to serve as backgrounds for her interiors. In 1982, she wrote, "Painting is primarily a form of communication … I try to freeze people in the middle of feeling something, documenting through a fleeting personal moment, a specific time in history." Artforum's Ronny H. Cohen attempted to dub work like Tewes's—which sought to communicate in an immediate, accessible fashion to a wider audience—"energism," a label that never caught on with critics, who felt it was too elastic a concept.

Tewes's early paintings were described by some critics as incisive and oddly affecting. They investigated social relationships in commonplace family or leisure situations, as in Moose Club Gambling (1978) or The Livingroom Couch (1982), which depicts a middle-class couple slumped on a sofa in their no-frills home; the woman stares out ambiguously, perhaps as one critic noted, leaving the final word on their lives to a half-empty/half-full glass at the edge of the picture's foreground.

Ronny Cohen called Tewes's style illustrative, precise and realist, but others like Brian Breger observed that she avoided "the frigid exactness of the super-realists" by capturing the warmth, humor and emotional depths of her subjects. According to critic Scott Cook, her style largely masked the degree to which—unlike photorealist painters— she altered and supplemented her environments and compositions, a process of construction, according to imagination, rather than replication. Cohen suggested it was a "new kind of documentary painting," partaking of 20th-century American social realism, refracted through Pop's interest in the everyday and through Minimalist refinement.

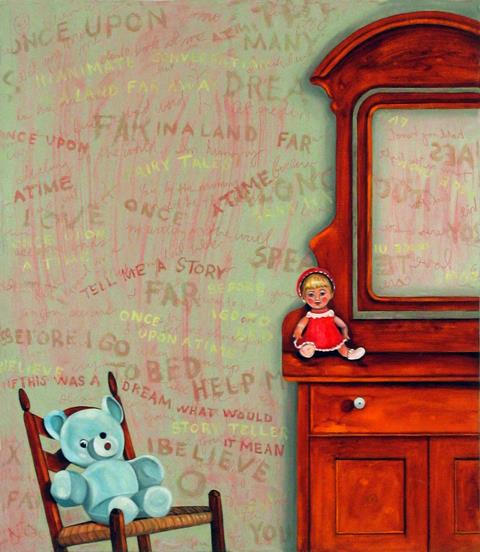
Robin Tewes, Inanimate Conversation, oil on birch panel, 12" x 16," 1996.

=== Rooms Without People works ===
Tewes's environments became increasingly refined in the 1990s through the influence of Japanese art and minimalists like Agnes Martin. Less figurative, with pristine, 1950s-like interiors, they were painted in a deadpan style recalling Magritte. ARTnews critic Barbara Pollack described them as "pretty as bonbons, potent as cherry bombs" and Roberta Smith of The New York Times noted their sense of color and detail. Nonetheless, critics observed that these intimately scaled, frozen moments also conveyed a stifling hermeticism in which "domesticity becomes terrifying." Details such as empty chairs, rugs resembling black holes, empty mirrors, switched-on lights, smoking cigarettes, and strewn toys in vacant rooms conveyed a sense of absence, silence, or speechlessness in the lives of unseen inhabitants.

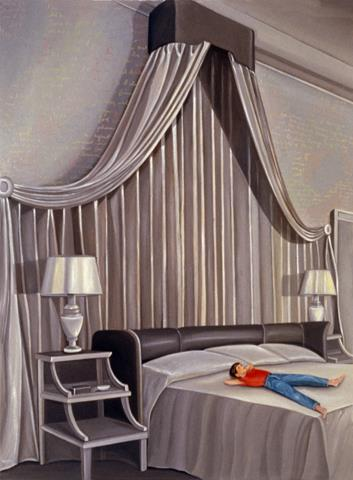
Robin Tewes, I'm Not Home Please Leave a Message, oil on birch panel, 24" x 32," 1999.

Tewes explained, "I'm interested in that subconscious current. I think about things unspoken … the energy left in a room after a certain conversation." At times that energy took the form of scratched, nearly invisible graffiti on walls, floors and furniture. Critics speculated that the ambiguous scribbles might represent plaintive, rueful traces of recent exchanges, thought projections, or conversations to come, intimating marital discord, sexual tension, irreconcilable disputes, and lonely childhoods. The Village Voice described the effect as one of the décor erupting "in silent but virulent outbursts and erotic daydreams." Inanimate Conversations (2002) portrays a one-eyed teddy bear and a doll, intruded upon by intense graffiti implying an absent child subject to such discussions; in I'm Not Home Please Leave a Message (1999), a boy lies on an adult bed next to an answering machine, surrounded by the searing, scrawled accusations of his separated parents.

In other paintings, Tewes decorated rooms with Rorschach-style marks or camouflage, that critics like Artforum's Ingrid Schaffner suggested were metaphors for the home as a screen for projecting primal emotions or "a demilitarized zone" littered with land mines of secrets, lies, and broken promises. Schaffner glimpsed signs of escape through "imaginative enterprise" in Tewes's depictions of children absorbed in drawing or shadow puppets, contra their surroundings, however others like the Los Angeles Times' William Wilson saw in the work a wry, but dispiriting commentary on bourgeois existence.

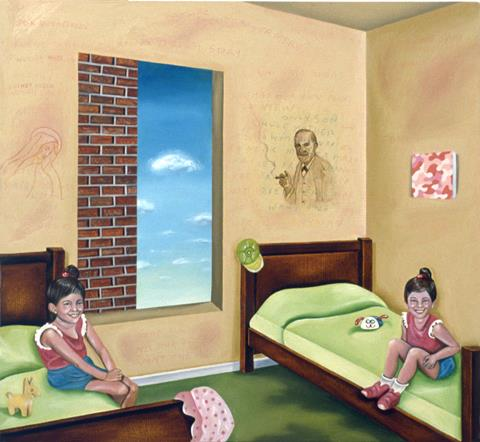
Robin Tewes, I Do Not Have a Penis Nor Do I Want One, oil on birch panel, 24" x 26," 2005.

=== Later work ===
In 2006, the Village Voice described Tewes' new work as deceptive, with a "thrift-shop" ordinariness masking formal sophistication paired with overt, ironic, sociopolitical content. Works like 911 (2003), Bushwomanflagbrickwall (2005), and Another Tasteful Discussion of Contemporary War (2005) featured weapons-of-war shaped clouds, well-heeled couples sharing cocktails dwarfed by a looming, camouflage painting, and other direct references to real-world political events. In other works, gender politics dominated, with Tewes critiquing middle-class propriety with wallpaper patterned with explicit sexual acts, crumpled papers, scrawled messages, or women flashing their nude bodies from outside windows or pulled-back coats.

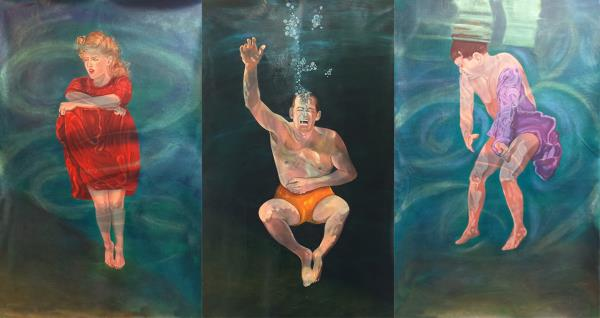
Robin Tewes, Underwater Series, oil on canvas, 58" x 108," 2016.

Critics have suggested that some later work signaled the possibility of transformation. In I Do Not Have a Penis Nor Do I Want One (2005), twin girls sit on their beds smiling, oblivious or impervious to ghostly drawings of Freud and the Virgin Mary hovering on the walls behind them. About her Men in Trouble series (2015), which portrays the men so often absent from past series, Tewes said, "In art, you never really see men in vulnerable, fragile, compromising positions. … I think in order to make real change, men need to figure out how to be intimate with each other, talk and help each other in a way that allows them to be vulnerable." The large-scale collaged tableaux depict men struggling with themselves and each other, amid various waterborne threats and compromising positions. Tewes has since begun a Women in Trouble series, set in domestic and workplace interiors.

== Social activism ==
Tewes has also worked as a social advocate and activist. After she and artist Hope Sandrow met as members of the Women's Action Coalition, they developed an installation called The Other Side of the Rainbow, made solely of testimonies anonymously contributed by victims of sexual abuse, including viewers of the exhibit. Designed to bring awareness and to counter silence around the issue, the exhibit traveled to a New York City homeless shelter, a Winston-Salem art center, the Whitney Museum show The Subject of Rape (1993), and an exhibit at Thread Waxing Space, Women and Violence (1994). Tewes also participated in an artist and homeless collaboration, On Our Way Home (1994), at the Henry Street Settlement, a Manhattan social service nonprofit. She has contributed socially-minded works to numerous exhibitions and benefits focusing on issues including women's reproductive rights, human trafficking, aggression, environmentalism, and the Iraq War.

=== Guerrilla Girls ===
Tewes was one of the founders of the Guerrilla Girls, a controversial, anonymous collective of (initially seven) feminist, female artists who organized in 1985 to draw media attention to, and to combat, sexism in the art world. Beginning with a highly publicized 1985 MoMA survey exhibition, the group used statistics (often drawn from institutions' own publications) and satire in posters, billboards, books and public appearances to expose discrimination and corruption in powerful institutions and figures. Typical of their posters were headlines such as "Do Women Have to Be Naked to Get Into the Met?" and "You're Only Seeing Half the Picture." Members adopted the names of dead female artists as pseudonyms and wore gorilla masks in public in order to maintain anonymity and keep the focus on issues rather than individual personalities.

The group has been widely credited with sparking dialogue and bringing international attention to issues of sexism and racism within the arts. It was honored by the Brooklyn Museum—once one of its targets—in 2007. In 2016, the Wright Gallery at Texas A&M University staged an exhibition of Guerrilla Girls protest poster art from 1985 to 2000 organized by Tewes and displayed alongside her Men in Trouble series. For many years, Tewes was rumored to be the original Guerrilla Girls member "Alice Neel". In August 2025, the Italian art magazine Artribune reported that, in an interview with a member using the pseudonym "Alice Neel", the member identified herself as painter Robin Tewes, effectively confirming the long-standing speculation.

== Awards ==
Tewes has been recognized with awards from the Pollock-Krasner Foundation (2015, 2008), Adolph and Esther Gottlieb Foundation (2007), and New York Foundation for the Arts (1998, 1992, 1997, 2004), among others. She has received artist-in-residency awards from the Ucross Foundation, Golden Foundation for the Arts, and Djerassi Artists Residency, among others.
