= Joanna Grochowska =

Polish contemporary artist

Joanna Grochowska is a Polish contemporary artist who engages with transhumanism and posthuman aesthetics, examining the relationship between the human body and emerging technologies. Her practice incorporates photography, sculpture, and digitally mediated imagery. She has exhibited in solo and group exhibitions in Europe and the United States, including New York, Munich, Antwerp, and Paris.

== Education ==
Grochowska holds an MFA from the Academy of Fine Arts in Warsaw and is an alumna of the Jewish Open University of the Shalom Foundation.

== Work and themes ==
Grochowska's work has been discussed within the context of transhumanist theory and posthuman perspectives, particularly in relation to speculative future forms of humanity. LUXUO described the conceptual basis of her work as revolving around concepts of "transgression and singularity."

In one example, authors in the academic journal Art Vision described Buried as depicting a "genderless figure" partially obscured by soil and interpreted the work as a transhumanist inquiry into the limits of biological existence.

VICE characterized Grochowska's subjects as androgynous or doll-like, linking her imagery to Hans Bellmer's Doll series. Whitehot Magazine framed her art within broader discussions of gender fluidity, identity, and morphological freedom—the right to modify one's body and mind.

== Writing ==
Grochowska's monograph, Transhumanism, explores the idea of transcending human biology through technology. It contains a visual collection of her artworks alongside academic and philosophical texts by Raymond Kurzweil and Stefan Lorenz Sorgner. Art Collector News described the monograph as "offering a glimpse into a future where the very nature of being human is redefined."

== Critical reception ==
In Homo Ex Machina: Der Mensch von morgen—Chancen und Risiken des Transhumanismus (2023) by Bernd Kleine-Gunk and Stefan Lorenz Sorgner, Grochowska is listed as part of a group of continental European artists associated with transhumanist-oriented art.

Designcollector Magazine wrote Grochowska's Transhumanism exhibition "extends the discourse of the Post Human," a series of exhibitions curated by Jeffrey Deitch in 1992.

Grochowska's work has also been the subject of peer-reviewed academic analysis. A 2022 article in the journal Art Vision examined Grochowska's art within a broader discussion of transhumanism in contemporary art, alongside artists Stelarc, Agi Haines, Mike Monahan, and Neil Harbisson. The authors noted that Grochowska's engagement with transhumanism, "is not presented merely as a technological aspiration but as a philosophical inquiry into the future of human existence."

== Selected exhibitions ==
- 2025 — Transhumanism, online solo exhibition, The Untitled Space, New York, NY
- 2025 — Sex and Politics, group exhibition, organized by Art-Icon, Bastille Design Centre, Paris, France
- 2025 — UPRISE: The Art of Resistance, group exhibition, The Untitled Space, New York, NY. Curated by Indira Cesarine
- 2024 — Transhumanism, solo exhibition, Galerie Verbeeck–Van Dyck, Antwerp, Belgium
- 2021 — Opening the Future, solo exhibition, Størpunkt Gallery, Munich, Germany
- 2021 — Fumes and Perfumes 8.0, group exhibition, Züblin Parkhaus, Stuttgart, Germany
- 2017 — NSFW: Female Gaze, group exhibition, co-presented by VICE Media's Creators and the Museum of Sex
