= Penelope Gazin =

American artist and clothing seller

Penelope Gazin is an artist, animator, dancer, and entrepreneur based in Los Angeles. She is the co-founder of Witchsy, an Etsy-like online marketplace for humorous and kitschy art, and the founder of Fashion Brand Company.

Gazin and co-founder Kate Dwyer received media attention in 2017 for inventing a fake co-founder for Witchsy named "Keith Mann.” They revealed that their interactions were more well received and outcomes more favorable when investors thought Gazin and Dwyer had a male business partner.

Gazin appeared in photographer Parker Day's 2017 portrait series ICONS.

== Fashion Brand Company ==
In May 2018, Penelope Gazin founded a clothing company called Fashion Brand Company. At the time, she had no experience in fashion. The company sells unusual and creative clothing, such as a sweater covered in nipples, an "octopus mini dress" with eight sleeves, and knitwear for lizards. Fashion Brand Company is noted for its inclusive sizing, with sizes going up to 7XL. Gazin told Nylon, "So much of my brand is just a stupid joke that I just kept taking it farther and farther because it makes me laugh."
