= Parker Day =

American photographer

Parker Day is a photographer based in Los Angeles, known for her deeply saturated portraits shot on 35mm film. She grew up in San Jose, and was influenced by time spent at her father's comic book shop. Day makes use of make up and costumes pulled from her own closet for portraits reminiscent of a photobooth. Her work explores the performance of identity, and the construction of character through costuming.

Her 100 portrait series ICONS was displayed at Superchief Gallery in Los Angeles in 2017. A companion book of ICONS was released by not a cult that same year. The series focuses on individuals who are considered contemporary social icons, including Molly Soda, Penelope Gazin, Scotty Sussman, and more.

Day released a lust, innocence and flesh themed series called "Possessions" in 2017 to commemorate the three-year anniversary of queer feminist fashion zine Polyester.

In 2018, Day created a series of portraits in her signature retro aesthetic of 89-year-old fashion icon Baddie Winkle for Polaroid Originals.
