= Fischer Cherry =

Irish American artist

- Born: Chicago, Illinois, US
- Occupation: Artist
- Education: Northwestern University, Brooks Institute of Photography, Goldsmiths, University of London

Website
- fischercherry.com

Fischer Cherry is an Irish American artist born in Chicago, Illinois best known for her work on re-framing gender representation in pop culture. Fischer is currently working between London, England and New York City where she resides.

== Education ==
Fischer Cherry received a Bachelor of Arts from Northwestern University, a Master of Fine Arts from the Brooks Institute of Photography and is currently a Goldsmiths, University of London MFA Fine Art candidate (2025).

== Career ==
Fischer initially worked for David Lachapelle and then served as a photographer for various fashion publications. She shifted her practice full-time to Fine Art in 2014, expanding into painting, sculpture and a range of interactive media. She has exhibited at The Brooklyn Museum of Art and Pulse Art Fair among others. Her work has been showcased in various publications such as The New York Times and ArtNet News.

== Exhibitions ==
2018 – "Between Our Ears" an interactive sculpture that compels viewers to take selfies with a camera located inside the sculpture and to consider how doing so might impact ones collective unconsciousness. "Between Our Ears" has been featured at Garis and Hahn Art Gallery in Los Angeles, California.

2017 – "Fertility" a large scale installation curated by Katelijne De Backer at Pulse Art Fair at the Miami Art Fair.

2016 – "Reset" curated by Kimi Kitada at Garris and Hahn in New York City.

2015 – "Selfies and Portraits of the East End" curated by Christina Starssfield with Cindy Sherman, Elizabeth Peyton, Chuck Close, Julian Schnabel, Joan Semmel, Lola Montes Schnabel, and others.
