= Olive Allen =

American artist

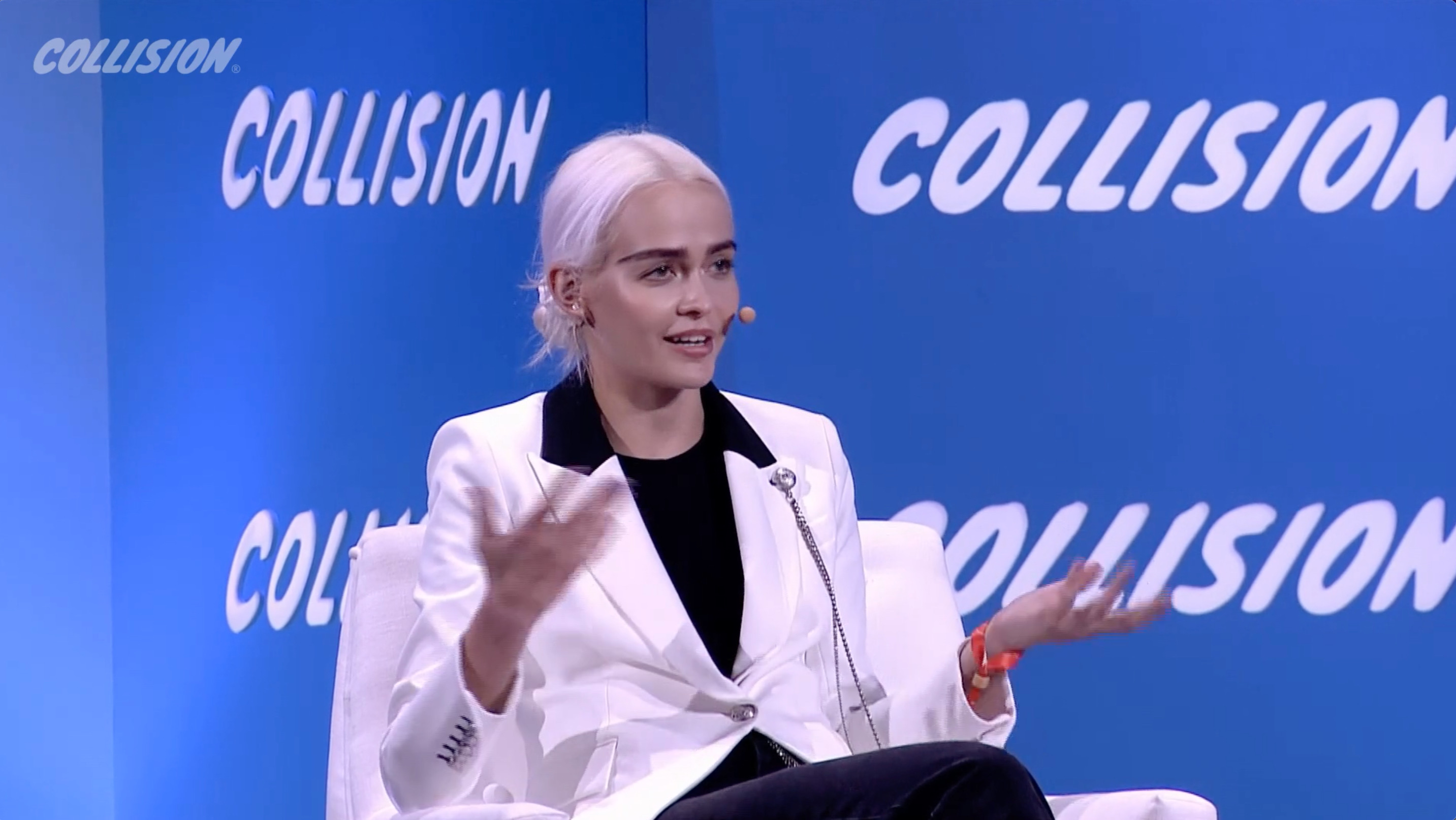
- Occupation: Visual artist
- Known for: NFT, Digital Art, Crypto Art
- Website: https://oliveallen.com/

Olive Allen is a New-York based visual artist, associated with crypto art movement. She has been releasing her digital artworks as non-fungible tokens since 2019.

== Career ==
Allen work focused the NFT space. She uses token-based digital works to create social commentary and pop-culture icons like Pokémon cards and Furbies to the video-game character Kirby also created her own character series, such as HYPEBIRDS, UnBearables, or The Sheeplezzz.

She build Mad Toy Junction, her own Metaverse gallery space and NFT Factory.

She was one of the artists who collaborated with Time Magazine on their genesis NFT drop.

Allen burned her Russian passport in solidarity with the people of Ukraine and created NFT from it to support humanitarian efforts in Ukraine.

== Selected art shows ==
In 2022, Allen’s debut with solo show Welcome to the Metaverse.

She has exhibited with König Galerie (Berlin), Postmasters (New York), Nagel Draxler Gallery (Cologne), and Save Art Space (London).

Allen's one of 30 pieces being exhibited by Köing in Decentraland at the former St. Agnes cathedral in a virtual space where she participated in the first group show of The Artist Is Online.

Allen's NFT artwork was a part of Trespassing sale at Christie's.

Allen's artwork "Post-death or The Null Address” was the first NFT artwork sold at Art Basel art fair.
