= Spring/Break Art Show =

Spring/Break Art Show is an annual contemporary art show held in New York that coincides with The Armory Show each spring. From 2012 to 2014, the show was held in a schoolhouse in Nolita, and in 2015 the show took place in Moynihan Station.

In 2023 the exhibit was held in September.
