= Alison Jackson (artist) =

British photographer

- Jackson by Francesco Guidicini, 2015
- Born: Alison Mowbray-Jackson; 15 May 1960 (age 66); Hampshire, England
- Education: Chelsea College of Art and Design; Royal College of Art
- Occupations: Artist, photographer
- Website: alisonjackson.com

Alison Jackson (born 15 May 1960) is an English artist, photographer and filmmaker. Her work explores the theme of celebrity culture. She makes realistic work of celebrities doing things in private using lookalikes.

== Education ==
Alison Jackson attended the Chelsea College of Art and Design in London between 1993 and 1997, and graduated with a BA (Hons) in Fine Art (Sculpture). From 1997 to 1999, Jackson studied for a MA in Fine-art photography at the Royal College of Art (RCA) in London.

== Career ==
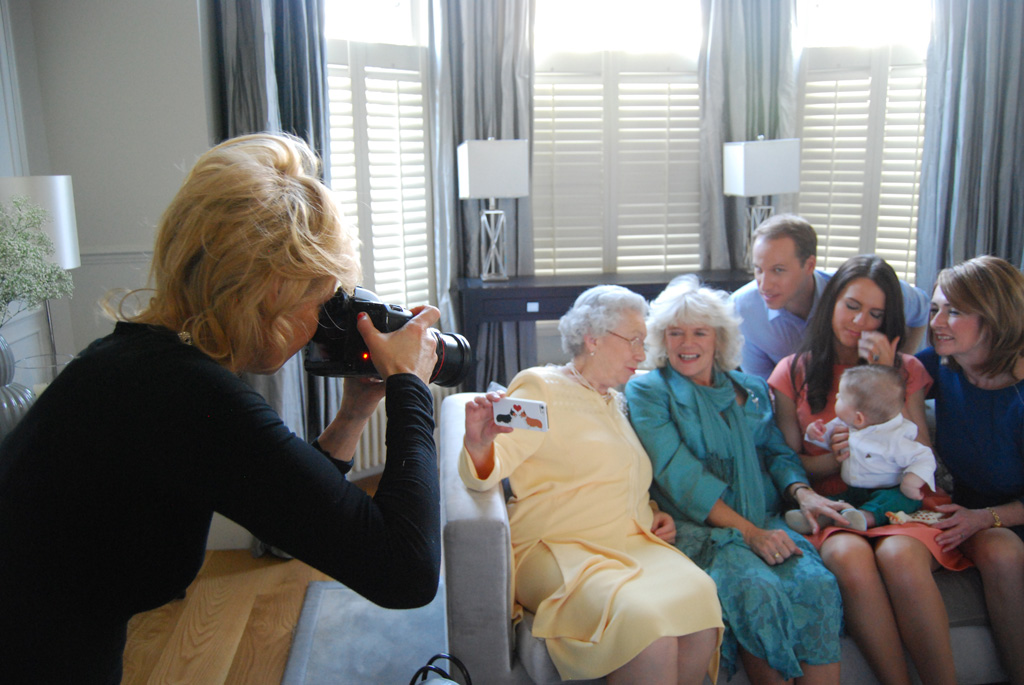
Jackson photographing lookalikes posing as the British royal family

In 1999, Jackson created black-and-white photographs that appeared to show Princess Diana and Dodi Al-Fayed with a mixed-race love child. The photographs, titled Mental Images, were part of her graduation show at the RCA. She has used lookalikes to create photographs and films of celebrities in private situations. At the RCA, Jackson won a number of awards including The Photographers' Gallery Award and in 2002, her advertising campaign for Schweppes drinks won gold and silver awards from Campaign magazine.

Jackson wrote, directed, and co-produced BBC Two's 2003 series Doubletake with Tiger Aspect. The show won an award at the 2002 BAFTAs. She made a series of mockumentaries and fake biopics for Channel 4 about public figures, using George W Bush and Tony Blair lookalikes in a series of staged scenes of their public lives. Blaired Vision, broadcast on 26 June 2007, coincided with Blair's exit from office. Jackson made viral internet posts with her lookalikes. They include: a video showing Osama bin Laden singing Lady Gaga's "Poker Face," a nude photo of Bill Clinton getting a massage, and an image of Donald Trump getting a spray tan in the oval office.

Jackson performed a one-woman show, Shot to Fame, in 2018 at Soho Theatre, and Double Fake Show in 2019 at Leicester Square Theater. In 2018, she began serving as a Conservative Party (UK) councillor for the Chelsea Riverside ward on Royal Borough of Kensington and Chelsea.

== Art exhibitions ==
- 1997 Attix Studio Gloucester Road, London, UK
- 1999 The Blue Gallery; "Temple of Diana Show" curated by Neal Brown
- 1999 The Royal Festival Hall, London; "Articultural Show"
- 1999 The Richard Salmon Gallery, London, UK
- 2000 Edinburgh Festival
- 2000 Art 2000 London
- 2000 The Richard Salmon Gallery, London, UK
- 2001 Jerwood Space; "Mental Images", London, UK
- 2002 Paris Photo, Musée du Louvre, Paris, France
- 2002 The Musee de la Photographie a Charleroi, Brussels, Belgium
- 2003 Female Turbulence; AEROPLASTICS Contemporary; Brussels, Belgium
- 2003 ICP International Center of Photography, New York
- 2003 Musée de l'Elysée, Lausanne.
- 2003 'Mental Images on War’; The Richard Salmon Gallery, London, UK
- 2003 Le Mois de la Photo, Montreal, Canada
- 2004 About Face: Photography and the Death of the Portrait; Hayward Gallery; London, UK
- 2004 Photo, London, UK
- 2004 Election Year 2004; Julie Saul Gallery; New York, U.S.A.
- 2005 Superstars; Kunsthalle Wien and BA-CA Kunstforum, Vienna, Austria
- 2006 Mak Museum, Vienna, Austria
- 2007 Paris Photo, Hamiltons Gallery, London, UK
- 2007 Confidential; M+B Gallery; Los Angeles, U.S.A.
- 2008 Starstruck: Contemporary Art and the Cult of Celebrity; The New Art Gallery; Walsall, UK
- 2008 Bush with Rubik's Cube Intervention Sculpture; Tate Liverpool Biennial, Tate Liverpool, UK
- 2008 Seeing is Deceiving; Hamiltons Gallery; London, UK
- 2009 J. Sheekey, London, UK
- 2010 Rude Britannia: British Comic Art; Tate Britain; London, UK
- 2010 Exposed:Voyeurism, Surveillance and the Camera Since 1870; Tate Modern; London, U.K.
- 2011 SF Moma, San Francisco, USA
- 2011 The Royal Family; Hayward Gallery, Southbank Centre, London, UK
- 2011 Peeping Tom, KunstHalle Amsterdam, Nederlands
- 2011 Alison Jackson: Up the Aisle; Ben Brown Fine Arts, London, UK
- 2011 Exposed: Voyeurism, Surveillance and the Camera Since 1870; Friedman Gallery, Walker Art Centre; U.S.A.
- 2013 Anderson Pertwee and Gold, London, UK
- 2013 Fondation D’Entreprise Frances, France
- 2014 Centre Pompidou, Paparazzi, Paris, France
- 2014 Schon Museum, Frankfurt, Germany
- 2015 NRW/Forum, Düsseldorf, Germany
- 2016 Museum Villa Rot, Burgrieden, Germany
- 2016 HG Contemporary, New York, USA
- 2016 Culture Station 284, Seoul, South Korea
- 2017 London Art Fair, London, UK
- 2017 Haifa Museum of Art, Haifa, Israel: "AnonymX: The End of the Privacy Era"
- 2018, The Royal Academy of Art, 150th Summer Exhibition, London, UK
- 2019, Fotografiska, Tallinn, Estonia
- 2019 Truth is Dead Fotografiska, Stockholm, Sweden
- 2019 Fake Truth; Westlicht Museum, Vienna, Austria
- 2020 Private; Camera Work, Berlin, Germany
- 2020 Soho Revue Gallery, London
- 2020-2021 Fake Truth; The Photogallery, Sweden
- 2021 Double Take; Coe and Co, Nantucket, Palm Beach
- 2021 Truth is Dead; Fotografiska, LA
- 2021 True Fictions; Palazzo Magnani, Italy
- 2022 IPFO Haus der Fotografie, Switzerland
- 2023 The Crown, Grove Gallery, London
- 2023 Truth is Dead, NRW Forum, Dusseldorf, Germany
- 2023 Paparazzi!, Westlicht, Vienna
- 2023 Panoramic Festival at Granollers, Barcelona, Spain
- 2024 Truth is Dead, Fotomuseum, Holland
- 2026 Photography in Power (group exhibition), Fotografiska Tallinn, Estonia

== Bibliography ==
- Private (2004, Penguin Books; ISBN 978-0-14-101918-5)
- Confidential: What you see in this book is not 'real' (2007, Taschen; ISBN 978-3-82-284638-4)
- Up the Aisle, (2011, Quadrille publishing)
- Stern Fotographie 70 (2012, teNeues; ISBN 978-3-65-200071-0)
- Private, (2016, published by Alison Jackson)

== Television ==
Jackson has created many TV shows and was the artist and creator behind BBC Two's 2003 series Doubletake, which she created, wrote, directed, and co-produced with Tiger Aspect, and for which she won and was nominated for BAFTAs.

- 2001–2003 Schweppes UK: advertising campaign. Created concept, devised ideas and photographed
- 2002 Doubletake. BBC2. Created, directed, wrote special. BAFTA
- 2003 Doubletake. BBC2. Created, directed, wrote and produced 6 part series based on Mental Images
- 2003 Doubletake Christmas special
- 2004/5 Saturday Night Live, NBC
- 2005 Channel 4: Not the Royal Wedding
- 2005 Channel 4: The Secret Election
- 2006 Channel 4: Tony Blair, Rock Star
- 2006 Channel 4: Sven: The Cash, The Coach & his Lovers
- 2007 Channel 4: Blaired Vision
- 2008 BBC2: Through the Keyhole guest home owner first broadcast on 28 May
- 2009 ITV1: The South Bank Show – 'Alison Jackson on Warhol
- 2010: BBC Historical Series
- 2011 & 2012 Sky: ‘The Alison Jackson Review’
- 2012 BBC: Celebrity BitchSlap News
- 2015 BBC: La Trashiata – Opera performed at the Edinburgh Arts Festival

== Opera and theatre ==
- 2015: La Trashiata: Edinburgh Fringe Festival, BBC Online and Odeon Cinema
- 2015: Edinburgh Festival, La Trashiata Opera
- 2018–2019: Shot to Fame – at Soho Theatre and Leicester Square Theater with Double Take Show
