= LAB ART Los Angeles =

Art gallery in Los Angeles, California, United States

Coordinates: 34°4′13″N 118°20′39″W

LAB ART | LA Street Art Gallery is located on South La Brea Avenue, in Los Angeles, California. It is the largest art gallery dedicated to street art and graffiti in the United States, spanning 6,500 square feet of space. In June 2018 it was announced that UK based entrepreneur Darren Manley had purchased the gallery from founder Iskander Lemseffer.

== History ==
=== Grand opening exhibition ===
LAB ART | LA Street Art Gallery opened on May 13, 2011, with a grand opening reception exhibition bringing together approximately 300 works, by over 50 artists from the street art movement. The opening line-up included: LEBA, Chad Muska, Alec Monopoly, Smear, ROYAL, Destroy All Design, Swift, Thank You X, Mar, Army of One/JC2, Dog Byte, Felix, Jay Shogo, CYRCLE, Philip Lumbang, Gregory Siff, SEPTERHED, LOUIS XXX, Rabi, Carl Paoli, DD'$, XVALA, Silver Buck, Common Cents, Jules Muck, Random Act, Desire Obtain Cherish, AJL, KH No. 7, Lydia Emily, Sarah'sINCOGNITO, CANTSTOPGOODBOY, Bon Bon Nielsen, Becca, LoudLabs, Stu Rad, Carly Wise, ADVNTRS, Snyder, E, Fragile, Miky Fabrega, and the house photographer—BIRDMAN.

=== Miss Danger on the Loose" exhibition ===
In July 2011 the gallery staged an exhibition, Miss Danger on the Loose, showcasing a group of emerging female street artists. Of the exhibition, Ms Magazine said "Pin-up girls, flowers and unambiguous political commentary are a bit too prominent" though picked out the work of K H No.7 and crochet artist Olek as "genuinely compelling."
