= Rabih =

Rabih (Arabic: ربيع), also spelled Rabeeh, is an Arabic masculine given name meaning "spring". It is common in the Arab world and has no religious significance. Similar names include Rabi, Rabie, Rabee, and Rabia/Rabiah/Rebeya.

Notable people with the name include:

- Rabih Abdullah (born 1975), American football player
- Rabih Abou-Khalil (born 1957), Lebanese musician
- Rabih Alameddine (born 1959), Lebanese-American painter and writer
- Rabih Alenezi, Saudi Arabian dissident and former colonel
- Rabi' al-Madkhali (1933–2025), Saudi Arabian Islamic scholar
- Rabih Ataya (born 1989), Lebanese footballer
- Rabih Haddad, Lebanese-American campaigner and charity executive
- Rabih Jaber (born 1987), Swedish singer of Lebanese origin
- Rabih Jabr, Lebanese electrical engineer
- Rabih Kayrouz, Lebanese fashion designer
- Rabi Kinagi (born 1955), Bengali film director
- Rabih Mroué (born 1967), Lebanese stage and film actor, playwright, and visual artist
- Rabih Osman, Lebanese football player and coach
- Rabih az-Zubayr (c.1840–1900), Sudanese warlord and slave-trader
