= David Leavitt (disambiguation) =

David Leavitt (born 1961) is an American novelist.

David Leavitt may also refer to:

- David Leavitt (banker) (1791–1879), New York City banker for whom Chicago's Leavitt Street is named
- David Leavitt (artist) (fl. from 2010), also known as Davey Detail, a member of the CYRCLE collective
