= Rabee =

Rabee is an Arabic name. Notable people with the name include:

- Abu al-Aas ibn al-Rabee (died 634), son-in-law and companion of the Islamic prophet Muhammad
- Rabee Allafi, Libyan footballer
- Rabee Al-Mousa (born 1984), Saudi Arabian professional footballer
- Sa'ad ibn Al-Rabee, sahaba (companion) of the Islamic prophet Muhammad
- Abu Bakr Rabee Ibn Ahmad Al-Akhawyni Bokhari (died 983), Persian physician, author of the Hidayat al-Muta`allemin Fi al-Tibb
- Rabee Jaber (born 1972), Lebanese novelist and journalist, born in Beirut, Lebanon
- Ahmed Rabee (born 1995), Emirati footballer
- Ismail Rabee (born 1983), Emirati footballer
- Mohammed Rabee (born 1982), Saudi football player
- Rabee al-Madkhali, former head of the Sunnah Studies Department at the Islamic University of Madinah
- Younis Abdallah Rabee, (born 1948), Kuwaiti sprinter
- Ahmed Rabee El Sheikh (born 1993), Egyptian professional footballer
- Rabee Sufyani (born 1987), Saudi football player

== See also ==
- Rabi (disambiguation)
- Rabih
