= Rabie =

Rabie is a male given name and a surname. Notable people with these names include:

== Given name ==
- Al-Rabi ibn Abu al-Huqayq, 7th-century Arabic poet
- Rabie Belgherri (born 1977), Algerian footballer
- Rabie Benchergui (born 1978), Algerian international footballer
- Rabie Chaki (born 1982), Moroccan tennis player
- Rabie El-Hoti (born 1985), Libyan futsal player
- Rabie El Kakhi (born 1984), Lebanese football coach and former player
- Rabie Mefta (born 1985), Algerian football coach and former player
- Rabie Yassin (born 1960), Egyptian football manager and former player

== Surname ==
- Anton Rabie, Canadian billionaire businessman
- Ashraf Rabie (born 1983), Egyptian basketball player
- Gurshwin Rabie (born 1983), South African cricketer
- Mari Rabie (born 1986), South African triathlete
- Mohammad Rabie (born 1978), Egyptian writer
- Pieter Jacobus Rabie (1917–1997), South African judge
- Ramy Rabie (born 1982), Egyptian footballer

== See also ==
- Rabie Ridge, township in South Africa
- Rabi (disambiguation)
- Rabee
