= Rabi =

Rabi may refer to:

- Rabi I, the third month of the Islamic calendar
- Rabi II, the fourth month of the Islamic calendar

== Places ==
- Rabí, a municipality and village in the Czech Republic
  - Rabí Castle, a castle
- Räbi, a village in Estonia
- Rabi, Iran, a city in Karun County, Khuzestan province, Iran
- Rabi, Panchthar, a village development committee in Nepal
- Rabi Island, a volcanic island in northern Fiji
- Rabi, an intended Japanese landing point on Papua New Guinea in the Battle of Milne Bay

== People ==
- RABI (artist) (David Torres; born 1984), American visual artist
- Abd al-Malik ibn Rabi, a narrator of hadith
- Al-Rabi ibn Abu al-Huqayq (fl. 622), Jewish poet of the Banu al-Nadir in Medina
- Al-Rabi ibn Khuthaym (died c. 682), tabi'i ascetic of Kufa
- Amir Hossein Rabii (died 1979), Iranian Air Force commander
- Ashur-rabi II (1013 BC–972 BC), Assyrian king
- Isidor Isaac Rabi (1898–1988), Nobel Prize-winning Austrian-American physicist
- Kenana ibn al-Rabi (7th century), Jewish tribal leader and opponent of Muhammad
- Rabi'ah ibn al-Harith (c.566-c.640), sahaba (companion) of Muhammad
- Rabia Balkhi (10th century), Persian poet
- Rabi Ghosh (1931–1997), Indian actor
- Rabi ibn Sabra, a narrator of hadith
- Rabi ibn Sabih, Islamic scholar
- Rabi Maharaj (born 1947), Trinidadian author and speaker
- Rabi Pirzada (born 1992), Pakistani pop singer
- Rabi Thapa (fl. 2010–2016), Nepali writer and editor working in English
- Rabindranath Tagore (1861–1941), Bengali poet, philosopher and polymath
- Saʽad ibn ar-Rabiʽ, sahaba (companion) of Muhammad
- Umar ibn Abi Rabi'ah (644–712/719), Arabic poet
- Utbah ibn Rabi'ah (c.563–624), pagan leader of the Quraysh during the era of Muhammad

== Characters ==
- Rabi, or Lavi, a character from the D. Gray-man manga series
- Rabi, one of the three main characters from Madö King Granzört
- Rabī or Lavie, a character from the Sgt. Frog anime series

== Other uses ==
- "RABi", a song by Bon Iver from the 2019 album I, I
- Rabi crop, a spring harvest in South Asia
- Rabi cycle, in physics is the cyclic behavior of a two-state quantum system in the presence of an oscillatory driving field
- Rabi problem, concerns the response of an atom to an applied harmonic electric field, with an applied frequency very close to the atom's natural frequency

== See also ==
- Rabbi (disambiguation)
- Rabies
- Ravi (disambiguation)
