= Ahmed El Sheikh =

Ahmed El Sheikh may refer to:

- Ahmed El Sheikh (footballer, born 1990), Egyptian football attacking midfielder for Al Masr
- Ahmed El Sheikh (footballer, born 1992), Egyptian football winger for Al Masry
- Ahmed Rabee El Sheikh (born 1993), Egyptian football goalkeeper for Tanta
