= RABI (artist) =

American artist (born 1984)

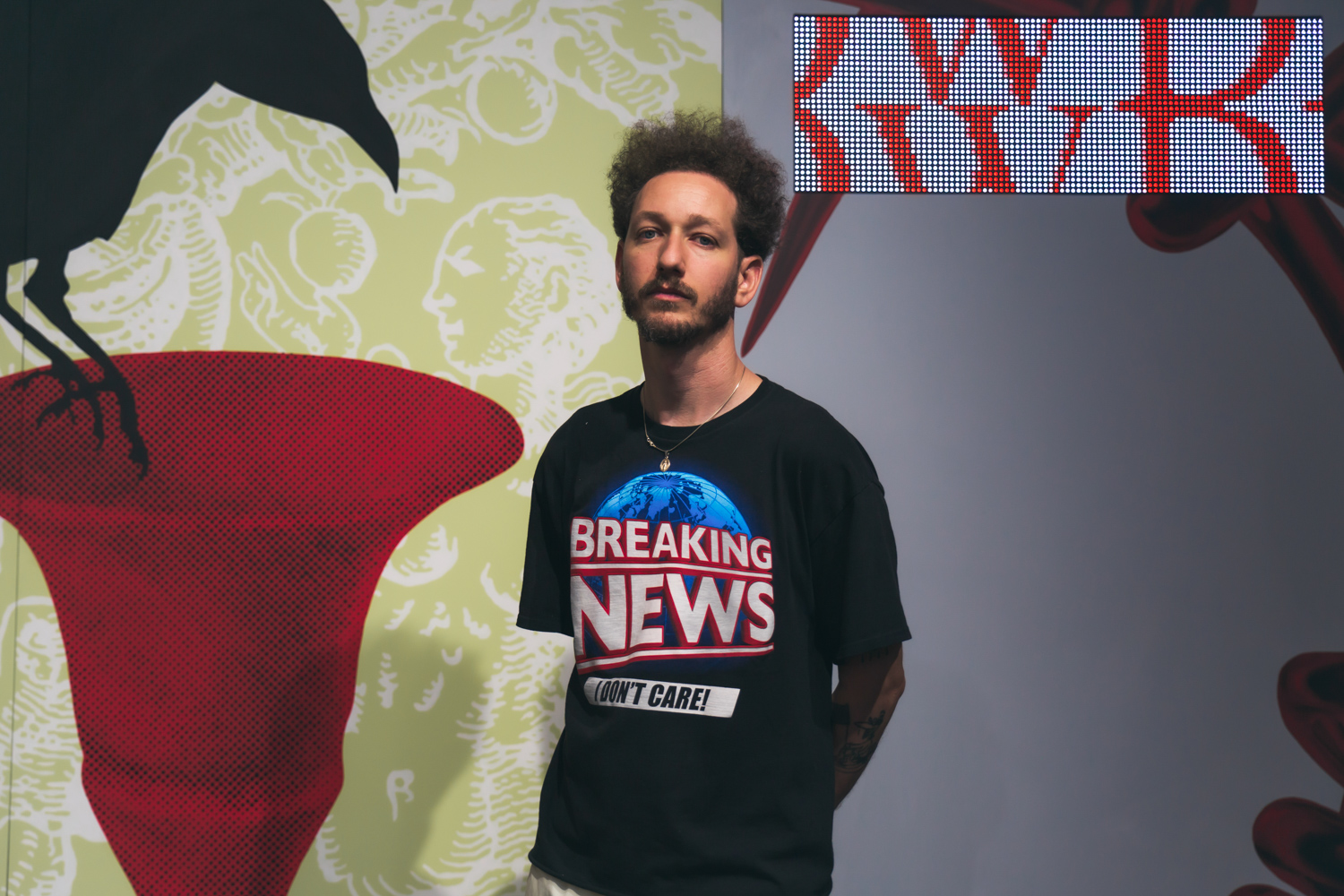
- RABI next to his work in 2021
- Born: David Emanuel Mordechai Torres; November 30, 1984 (age 41); Los Angeles, California
- Known for: Fine art, sculpture, muralism, photography, typography, videography
- Website: rabitowing.com

RABI (born David Emanuel Mordechai Torres in 1984) is a first-generation American visual artist of Puerto Rican and Polish descent from Los Angeles, California. He is known for being part of the artist collective, CYRCLE. RABI's works can be seen in public and private collections including that of Shepard Fairey, Ari Emanuel, Sean Combs, Museo de Arte Contemporáneo de Puerto Rico, MOCA Detroit, Bishop Museum in Hawaii, MGM Grand in Las Vegas, The Art of Elysium, the Contemporary Art Center in New Orleans, and the Urban Nation Museum Berlin.

== Career ==
RABI's works stem from his early life as a graffiti writer, skateboarder and muralist. Through skateboarding and graffiti, RABI began practicing art in public spaces, as well as capturing his personal world through video and photography. Themes of contradiction, duality, and sociopolitical philosophy become visible throughout RABI's work. In 2009 RABI co-founded the art collective CYRCLE along with David Leavitt and Devin Liston (Liston left in 2012), which gained international notoriety and allowed for him to take his love for public installation to a worldwide audience.

He spent a full decade building CYRCLE while growing his skills in video, design, photography, painting and sculpture. During this time he worked throughout Europe, Asia, Africa, Australia, and North America. While working with CYRCLE, RABI collaborated with artists, brands and non-profits including, HBO, Uber, Pharrell, TED Prize winner- JR, James Lavelle, Chad Muska, Woodkid, AIDS Healthcare Foundation, and Audi, among others.

In 2021 RABI participated in the worldwide public art campaign, #NOTACRIME for educational equality in Iran. RABI's mural was painted over the summer in New York and the piece directly confronts the shattered educational system, "a result of an entire minority being barred just because of their beliefs." The mural is in keeping with his previous work – all of which has focused on society and the human condition. The owner of a nearby building, overlooking the Nelson Mandela Memorial Garden at the corner of Frederick Douglass Boulevard and 126th Street, offered the wall of her building to help the project. That same year, he was commissioned by Firestone Walker Brewing Company in Venice to paint a large-scale mural on the building.

One year later, in 2022 RABI held his first large solo exhibition, after his time in Street art collective, CYRCLE, titled gen+esc (generation+escape). This was also his directorial debut.

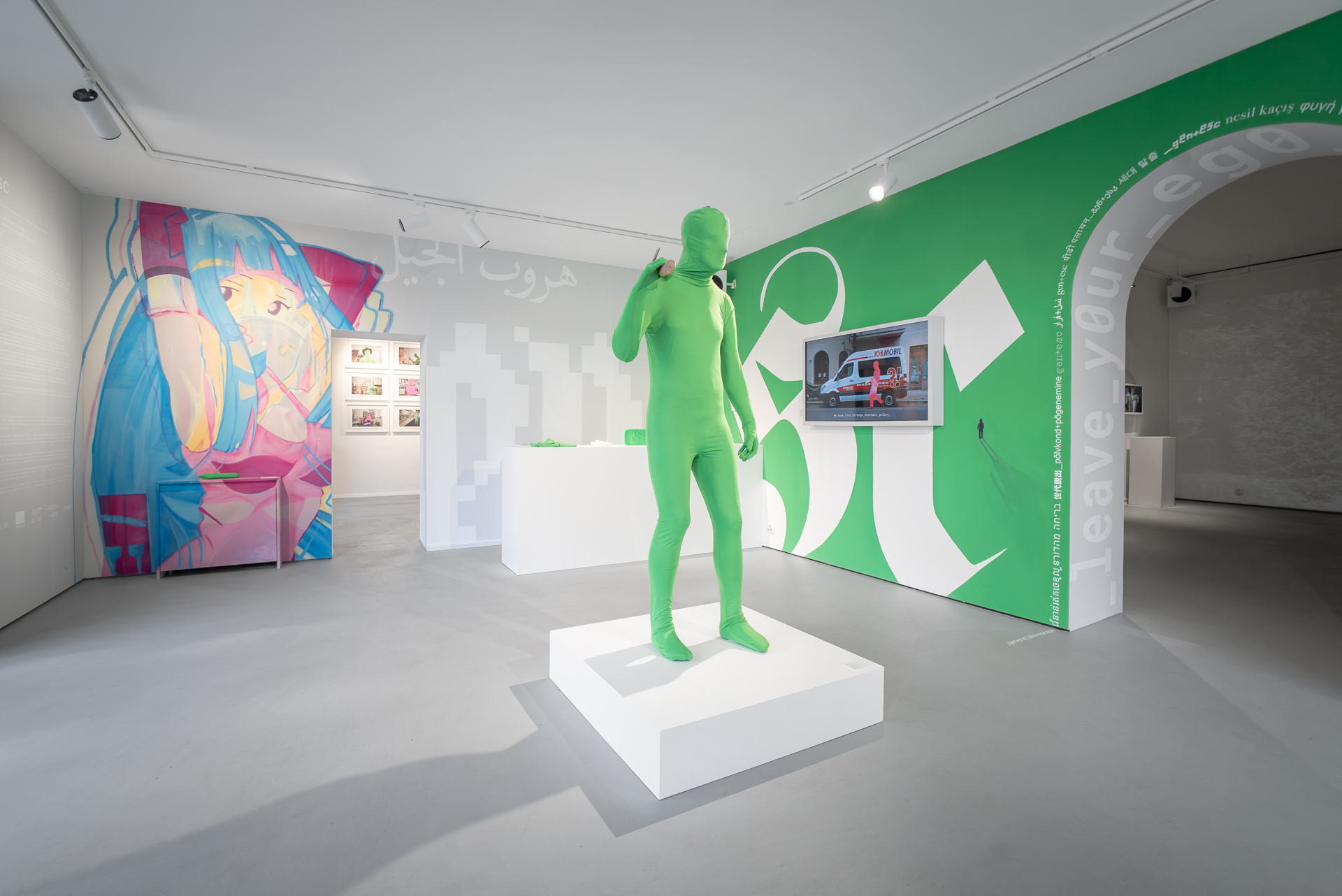
' _gen+esc ' exhibition by Rabi at Urban Nation Museum in Berlin. Photo by ARTXIV, 2023.

The show opened on September 15, 2022 in West Hollywood, California, at Nomad Gallery and ran through October 15, 2022. The exhibition was a series of short art films that “explored the relationship between identity and the artistic process.” Each short-film cross-examined “the role of image in personal narratives and reimagines the embodiment of self, depicting a world free of conventional posturing,” said RABI. An interactive experience, guests were invited to utilize AR technology that cast imagery onto green-screen components throughout the space, including the building’s facade and different sculptures while experiencing the show. Exclusive NFTs and prints were available throughout the exhibition for purchase as well.

In August 2023 RABI continued his solo exhibition gen+esc (generation+escape), this time in Berlin. The exhibition opened at the new Urban Nation Museum satellite gallery, in Neukölln, and took place during Berlin Art Week, featuring short art films, installations, print editions, and ceramic sculptures, produced in part by ARTXIV. There he also created his first mixed-reality mural commissioned by Project PM 20 in Prenzlauer Berg.

In January 2024 RABI participated in a group exhibition titled The Cat Art Show in Los Angeles at the Wallis Annenberg PetSpace and 10% of art sales went to the fund.

In March 2024 RABI was invited by HK Walls and the Hong Kong Consulate to create a mural in collaboration with the US Consulate General, Hong Kong in Sheung Wan. He was the only artist selected to represent the United States as an artist from each nation was hand picked to participate. There he also exhibited works for Art Basel Hong Kong As well as hosted a screening and Q&A at the Soho House Hong Kong for his current short film works, Gen+esc.

In 2026, RABI presented his solo exhibition We Buy Souls! at the Good Mother Gallery in Los Angeles, which marked the first time his long-running public art intervention was translated into a gallery setting. The project, which originated in 2022 as a series of mysterious posters appearing on telephone poles and walls across Los Angeles and other cities, featured a hotline that allowed the public to leave messages regarding the value of their souls, ultimately collecting over 40,000 voicemails.

WE BUY SOULS sign spotted in Los Angeles CA in 2021

The exhibition featured a comprehensive collection of audio, video, documentation, performance art, sculpture, and paintings, alongside interactive elements such as official contracts and a limited-edition monograph.

== Selected exhibitions and works ==
- 2026, RABI, We Buy Souls!, Good Mother Gallery, Los Angeles, CA USA
- 2023, RABI, _gen+esc, Urban Nation Museum, Berlin, Germany
- 2022, RABI, _gen+esc, Nomad Gallery, Los Angeles, CA USA
- 2019, Rabi x JR Collaboration, Branded Arts Maya Angelou Mural Festival, Los Angeles, CA USA
- 2017, POW! WOW! Art Festival, Arad, Israel
- 2015, RABI, NOTHING EXISTS, Montreal, Canada
- 2012, RABI, ORGANIZED CHAOS!, Los Angeles, CA USA
- 2011, RABI, CYRCLE, WE NEVER DIE!, Design Matters, Los Angeles, CA USA
