= Abd al-Malik ibn Rabi =

Abd al-Malik ibn Rabi was among the narrators of hadith.

== name ==
He was the son of Rabi ibn Sabra, and reported the hadith of Sabra reporting on the prohibition of Mut'ah on his fathers authority. Although this hadith qualified into Sahih Muslim, some have questioned his reliability as a narrator.

== Legacy ==
=== Sunni view ===
Ibn al-Qayyim al-Jawziyya, a 14th century Sunni Islamic scholar states:

...This Riwayat is narrated by Abd al-Malik ibn Rabi ibn Sabra from his father, from his grandfather, and Ibn Moe'en has spoken against him (that is he did not consider him fit and trustworthy narrator). Bukhari has equally not mentioned this tradition in his Sahih knowing well that it concerns an important matter and his hesitation in recording this tradition can only be understood to mean that he doubted its veracity...
