= Jules Muck =

British artist

- Born: Stoke-on-Trent
- Known for: Graffiti, Muralist
- Website: http://julesmuck.com/

Jules Muck is a graffiti and mural artist based in Venice, California.

== Biography ==
Born in Stoke-on-Trent, she began painting graffiti in Europe and Greece, taking her nickname from a pet name given by her grandmother. Muck was living and working in Manhattan in 1999 when Lady Pink found her painting a rooftop illegally and offered an apprenticeship. Pink's tutelage proved transformative, allowing Muck to achieve success through painting murals and private commissions. In 2008, Muck drove across the country to California, eventually running out of gas in Venice, California, where she lived in her car and painted on the streets before becoming financially solvent.

She is best known for her murals and graffiti work around Venice, often emphasizing use of the color green. In addition to murals in the Hotel Casa del Mar and other local businesses, her work has been exhibited in various local galleries, including LAB ART Los Angeles and the Pacific Design Center.

== Gallery ==
Muck Rock in Venice

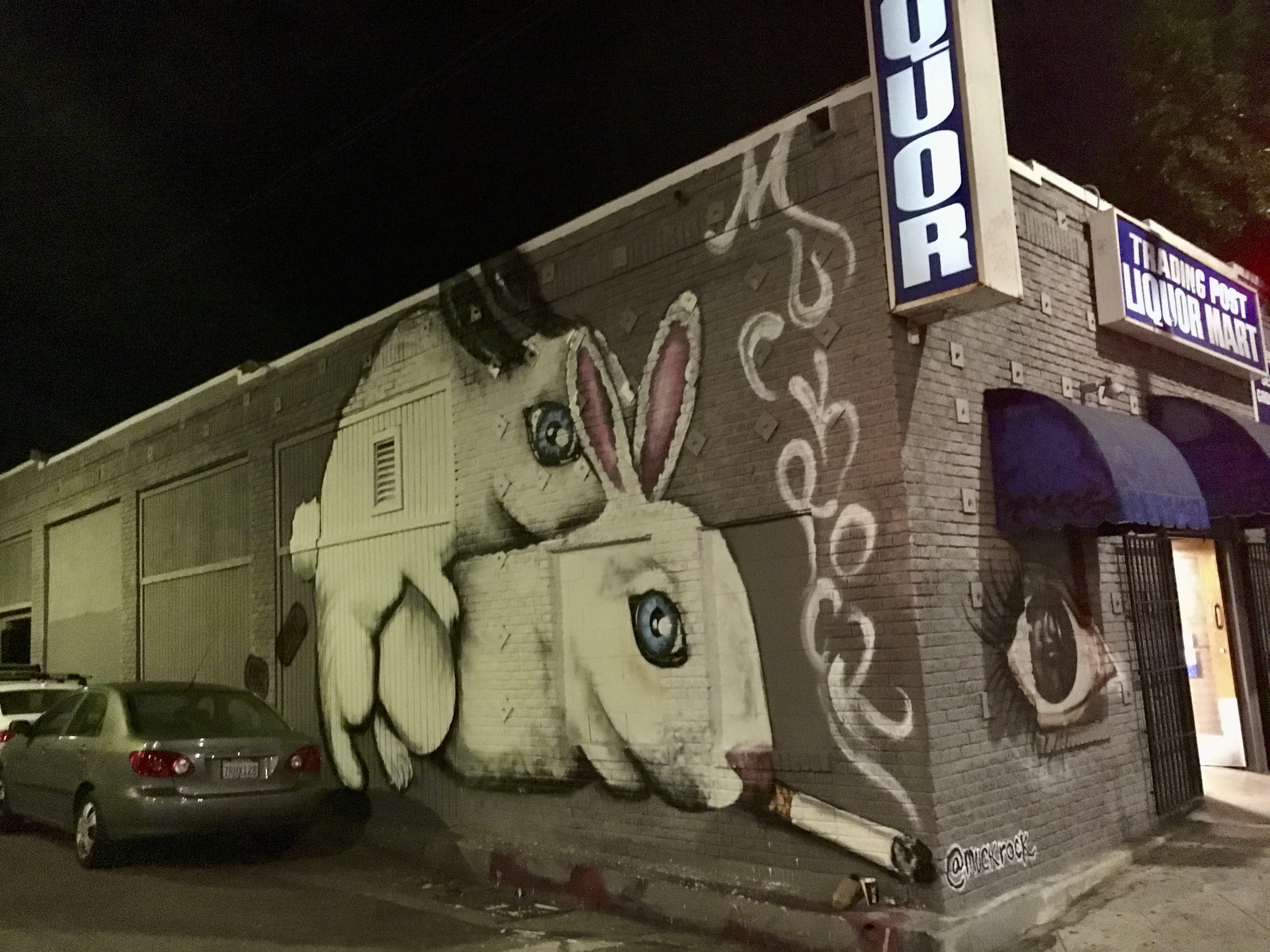

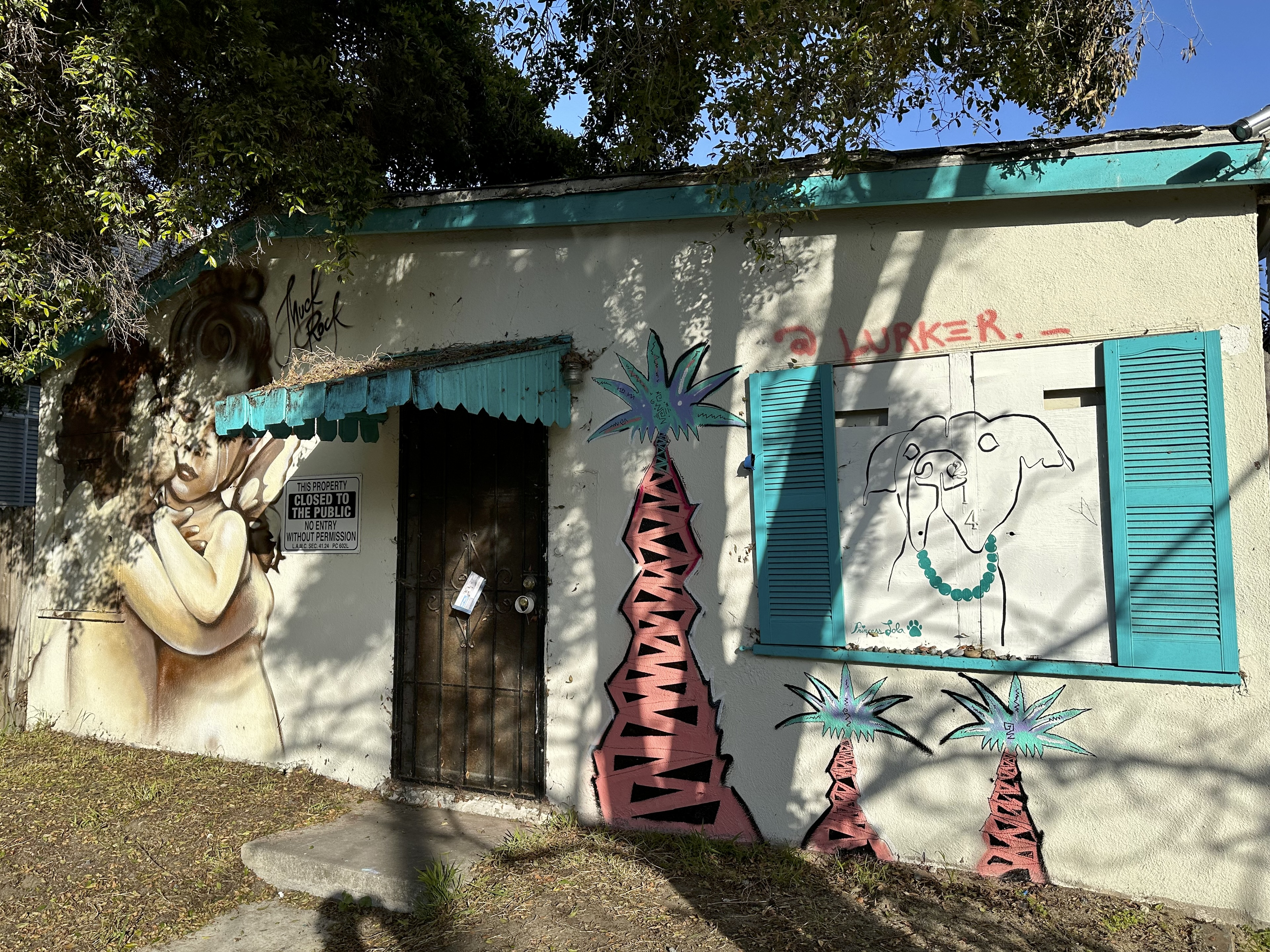
A building on Horizon Avenue features both Claire Salvo on the right and Jules Muck on the left.

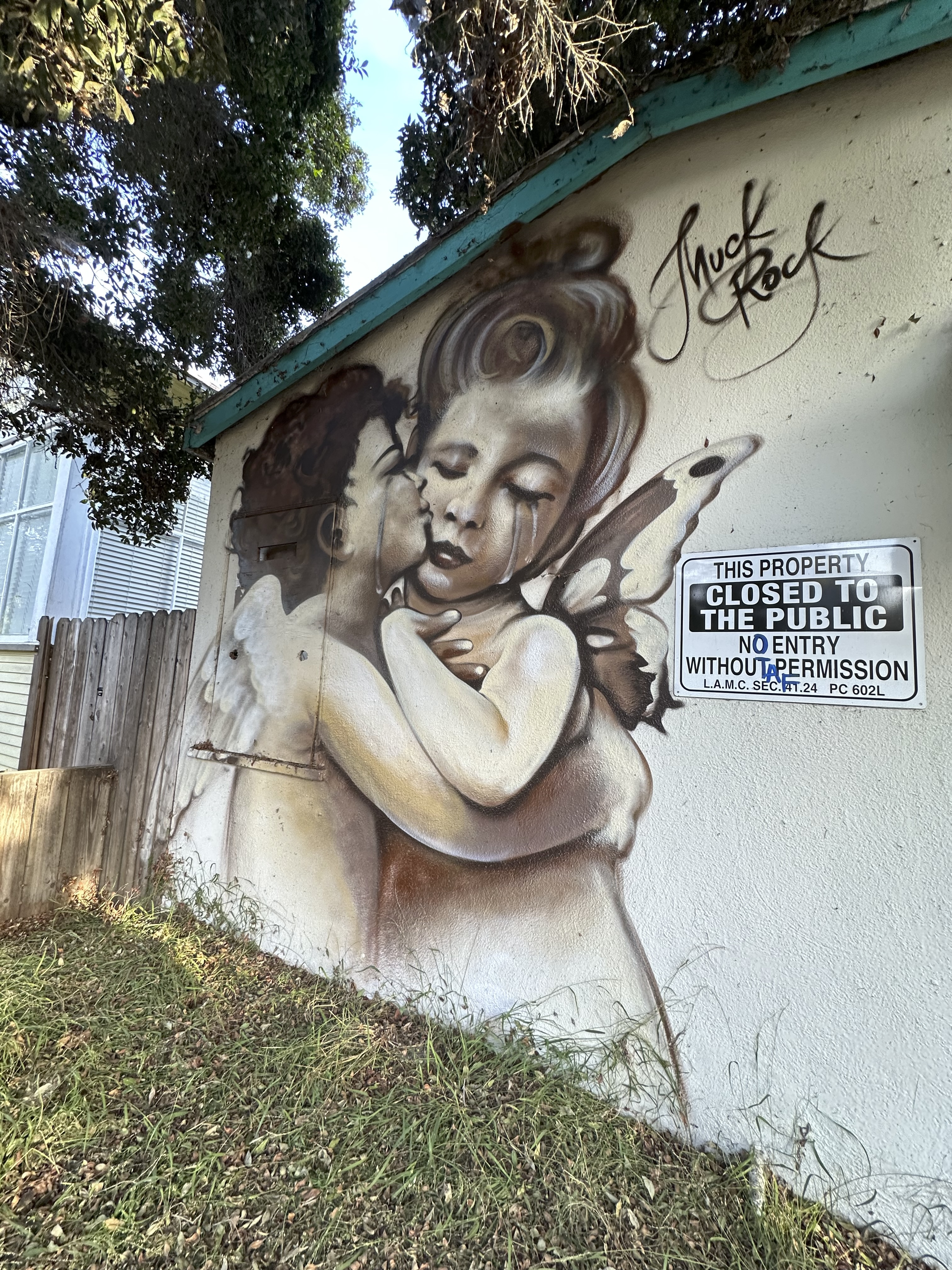

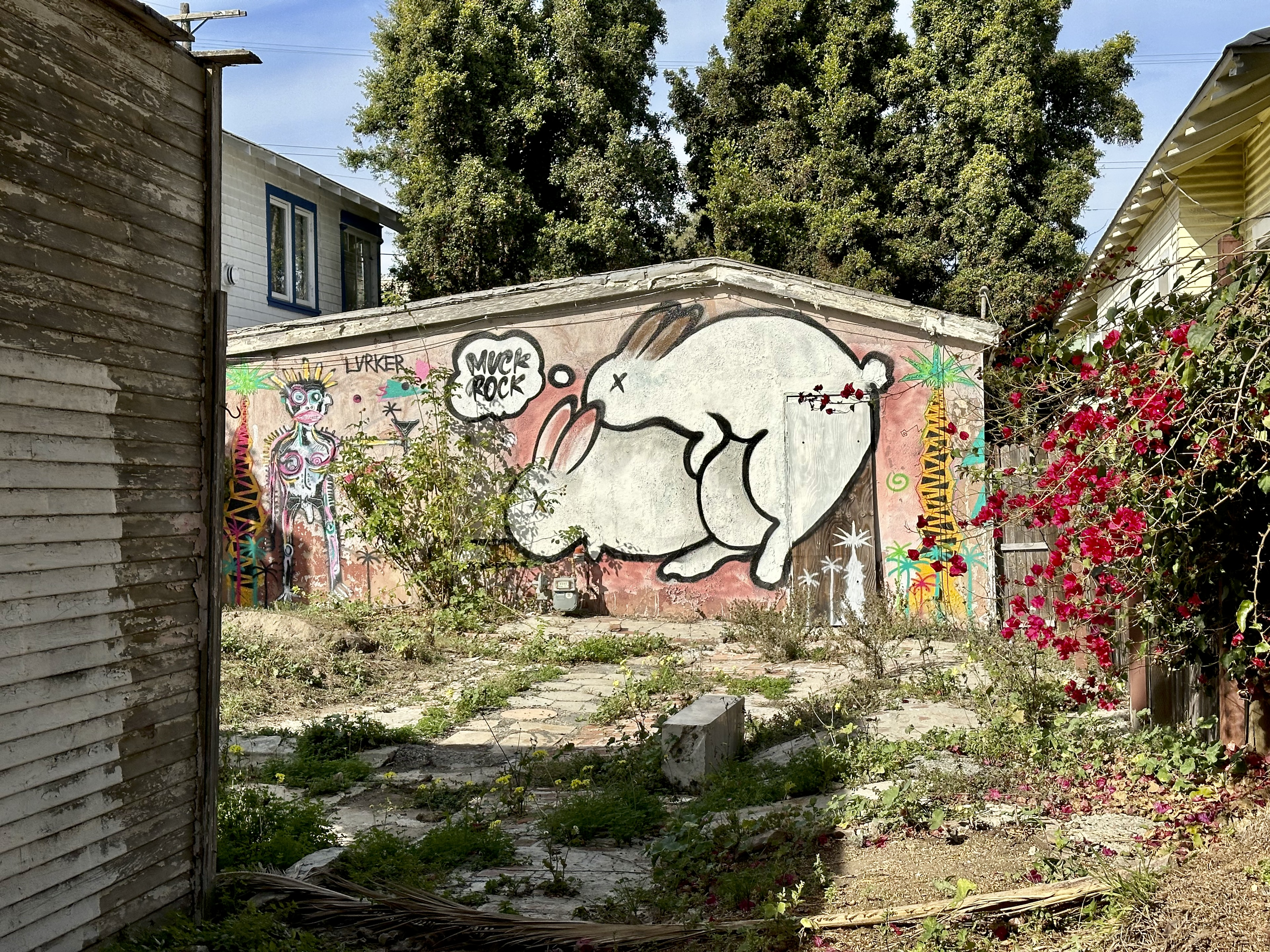
The reverse side of a building on Horizon Avenue features Jules Muck and Erik White.

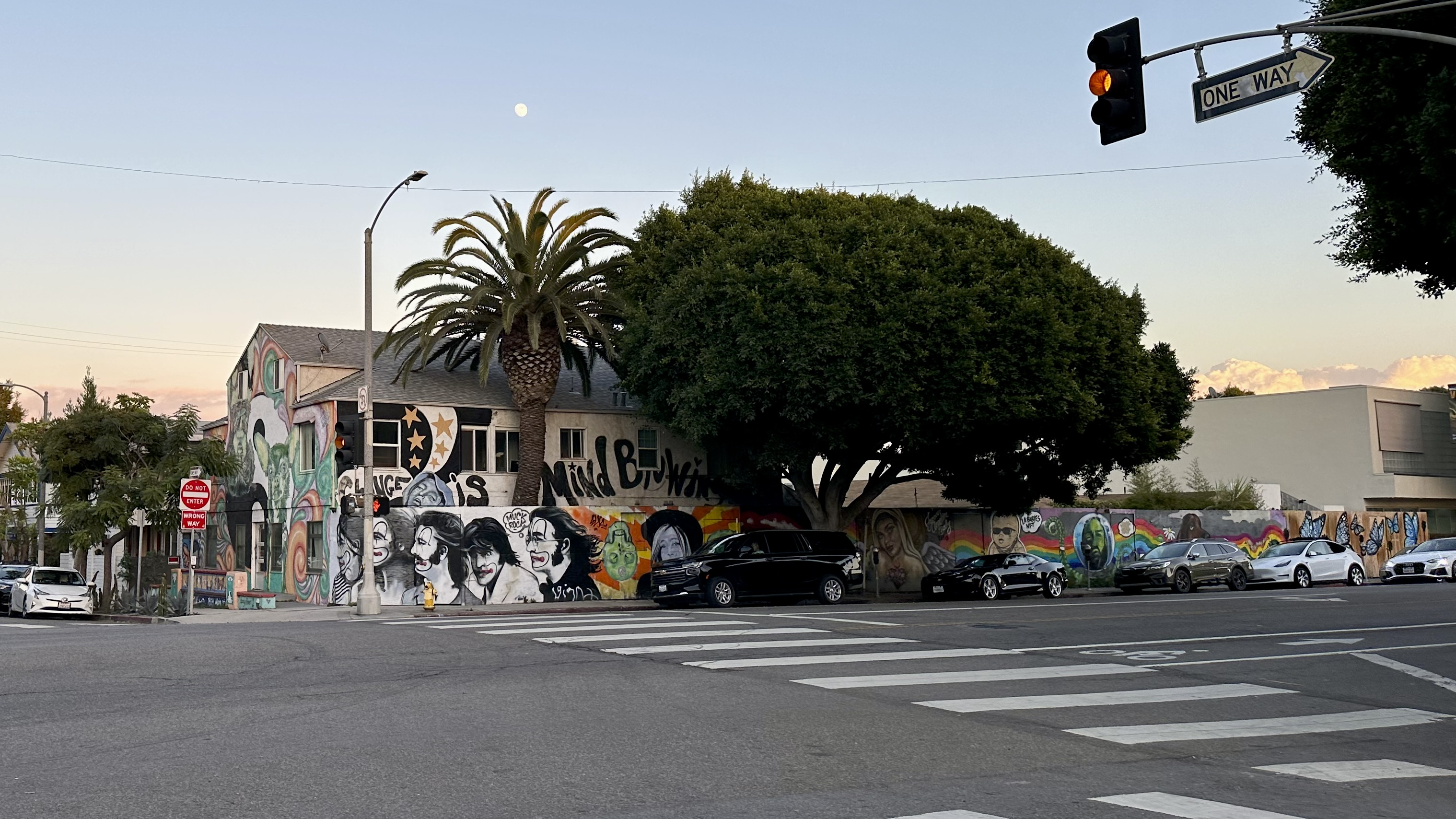

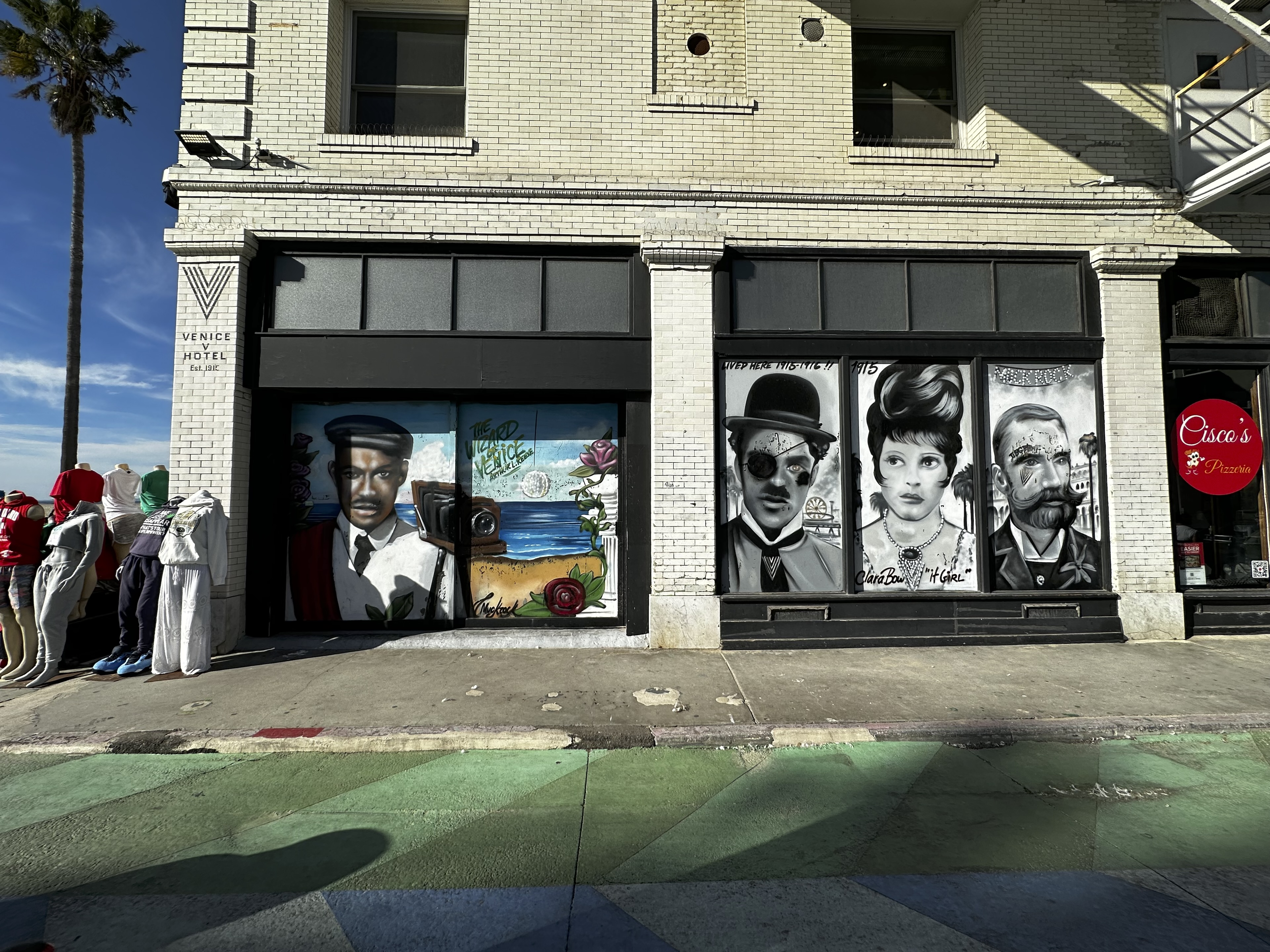

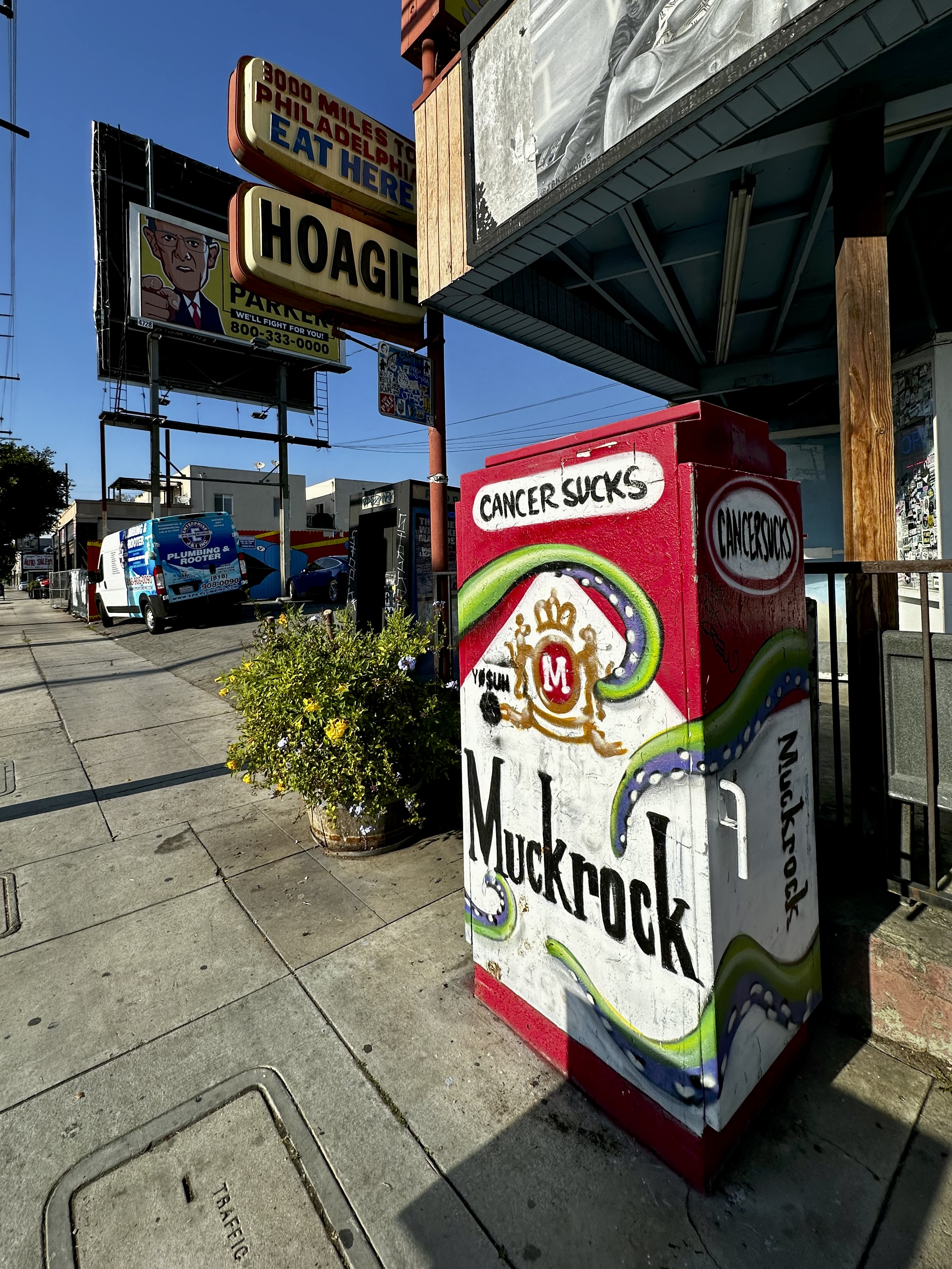

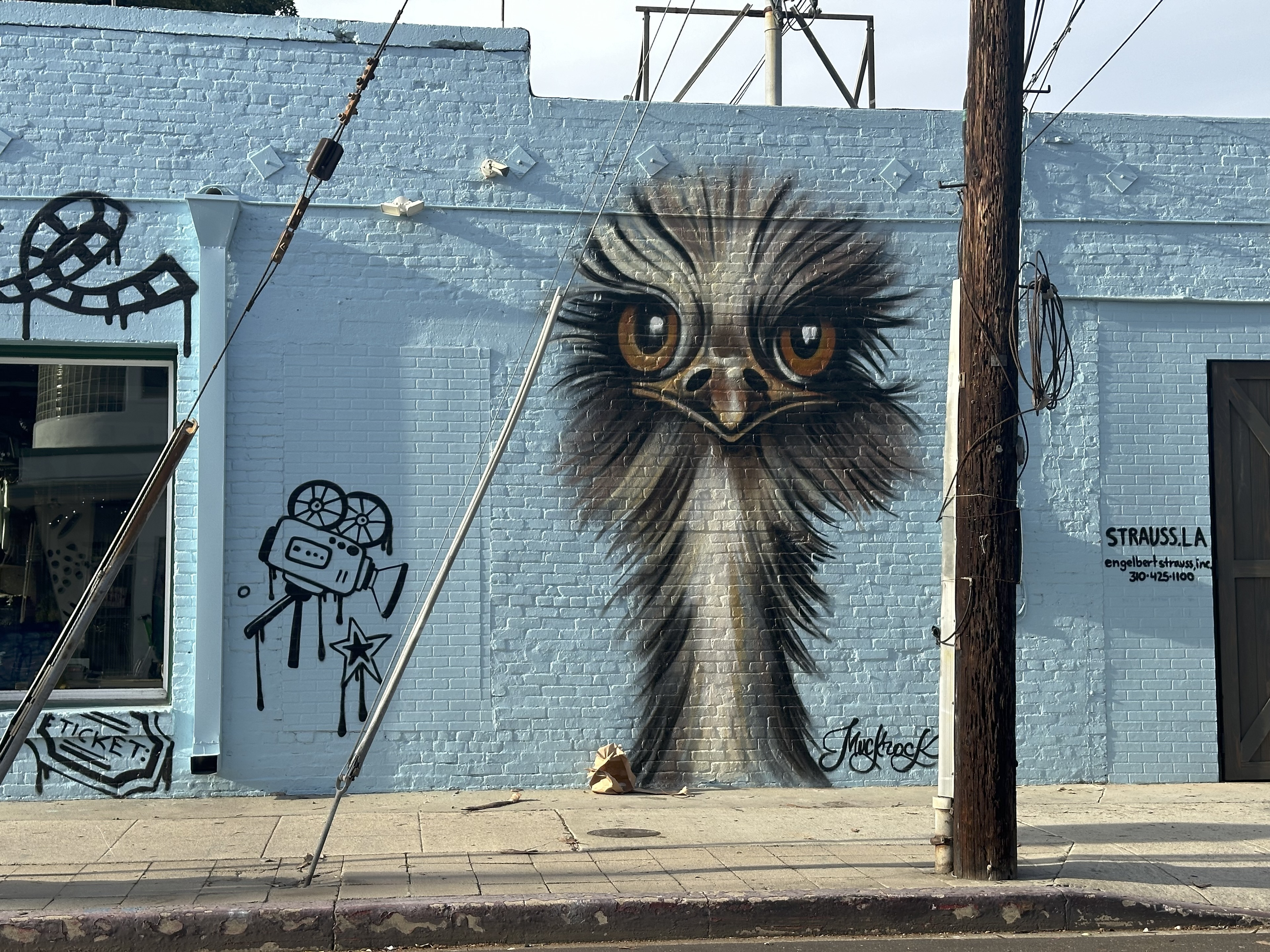
An ostrich at Strauss on San Juan, 2023.

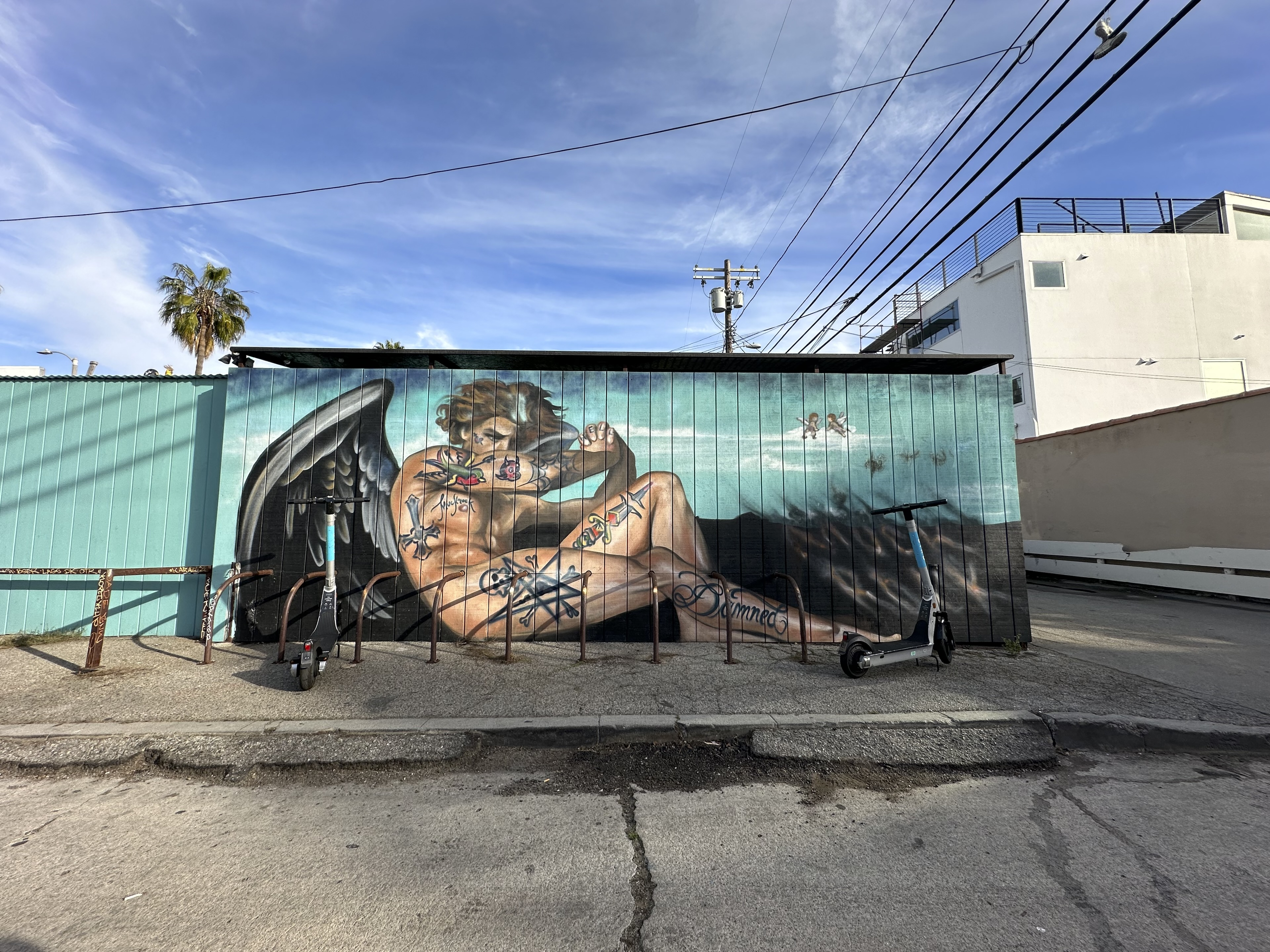
Outside Roosterfish.

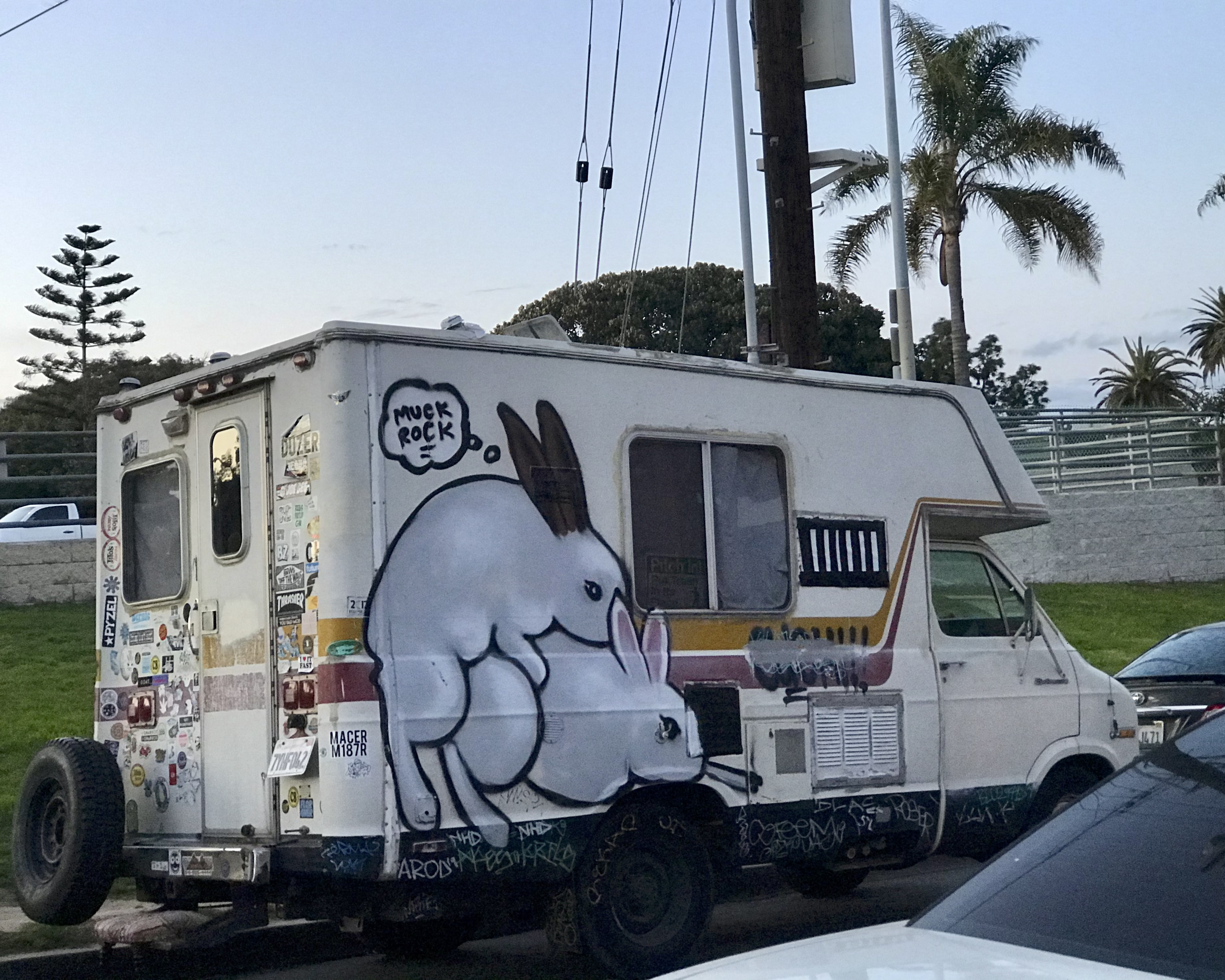

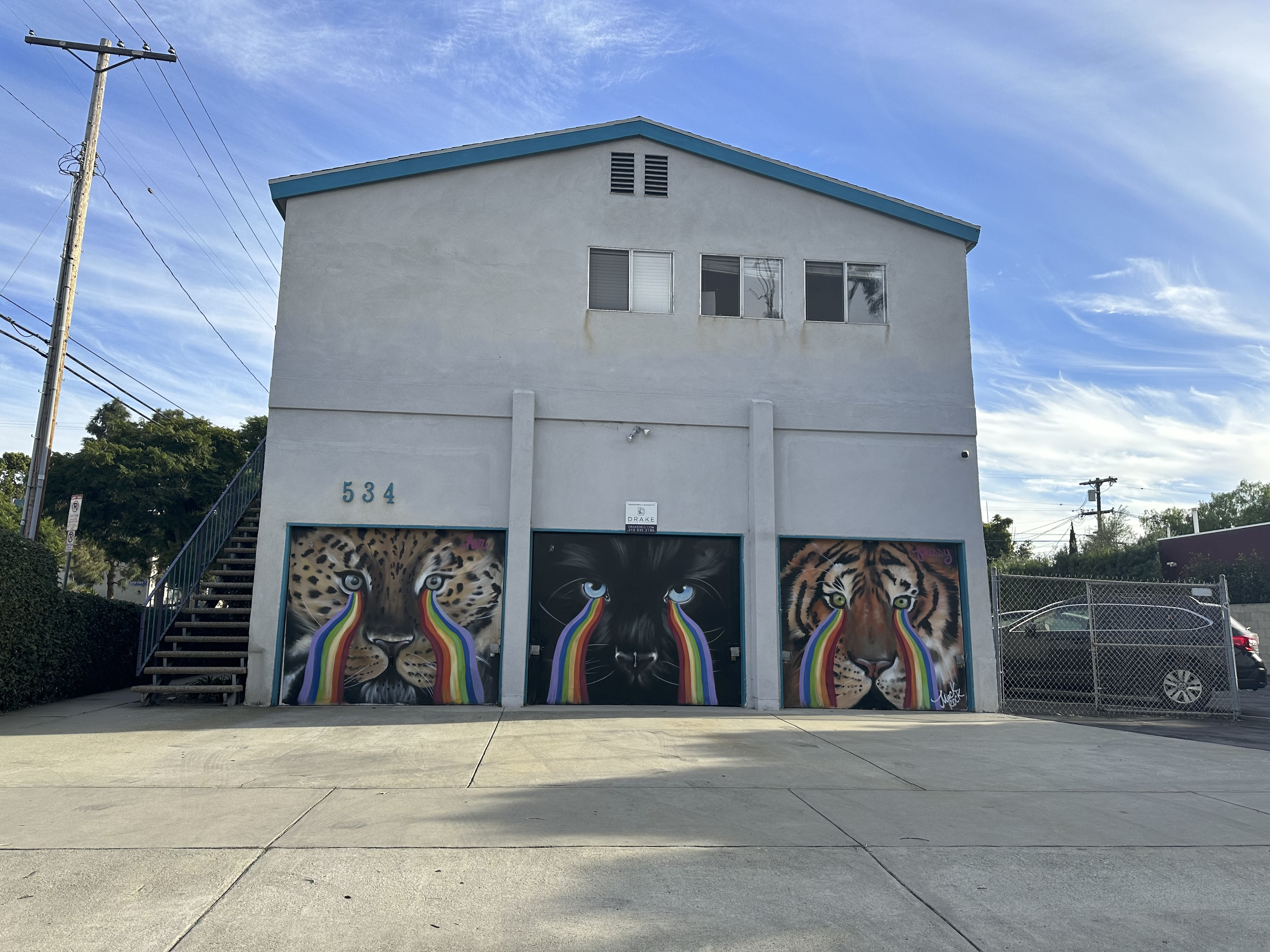

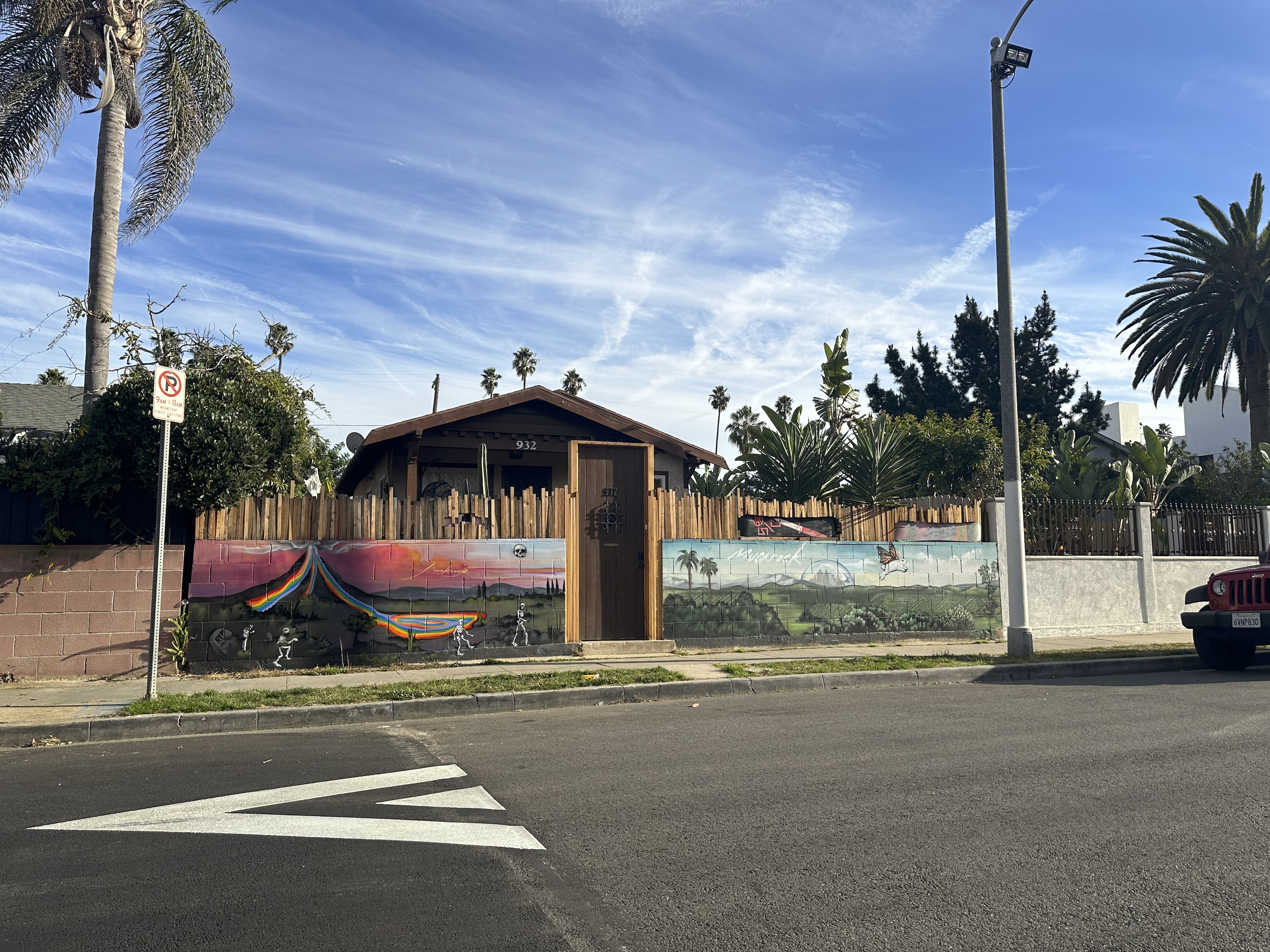

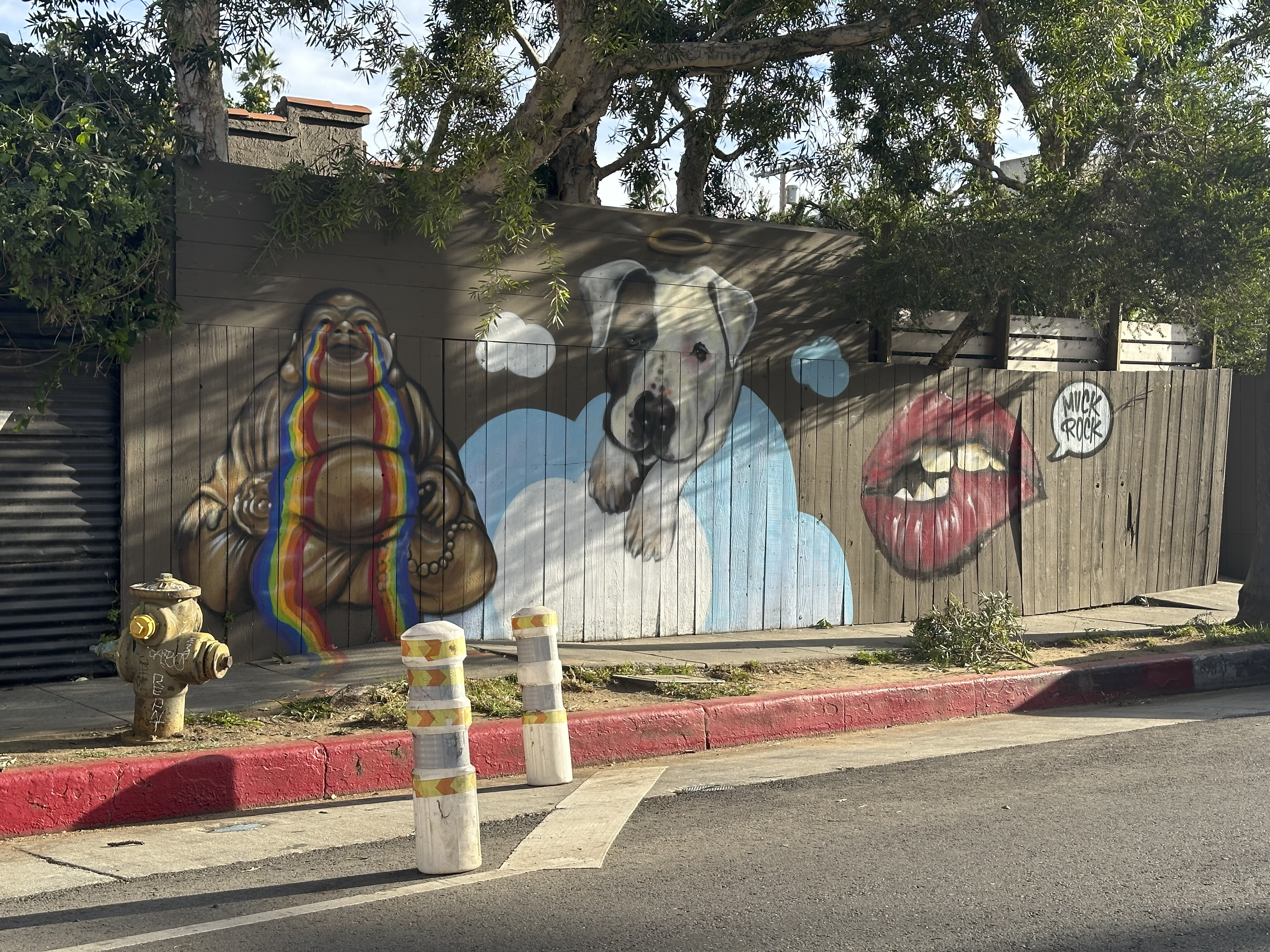

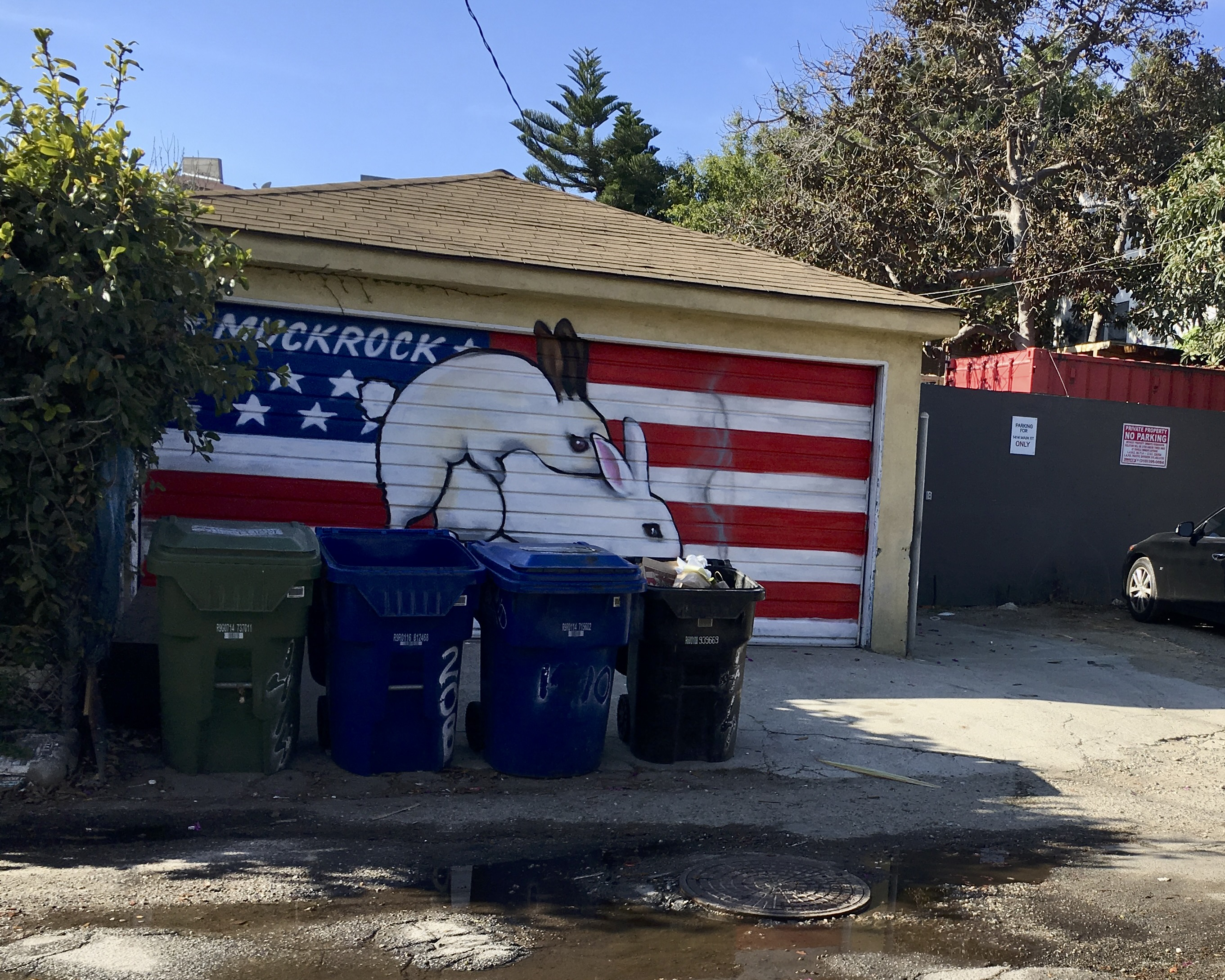

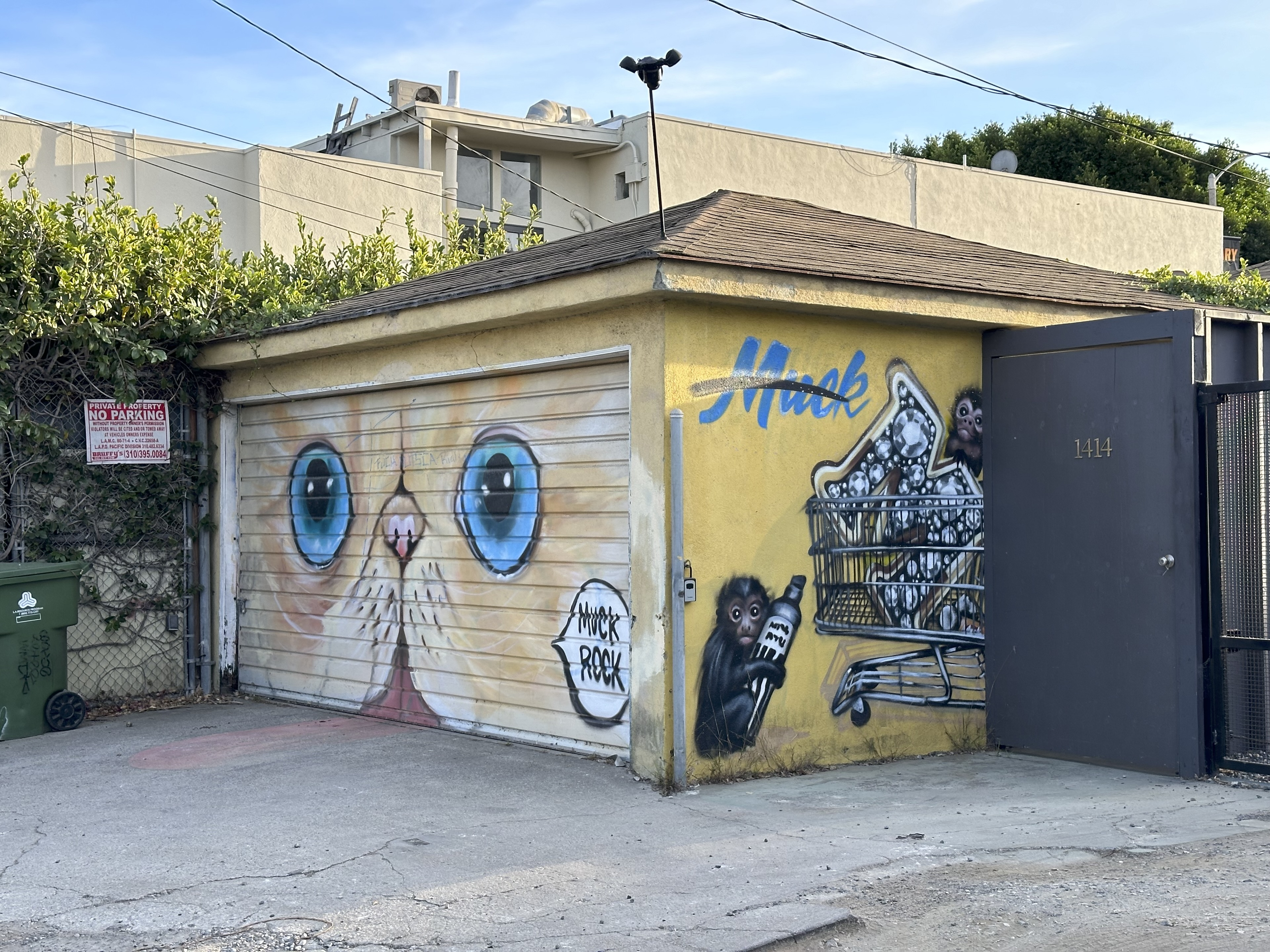

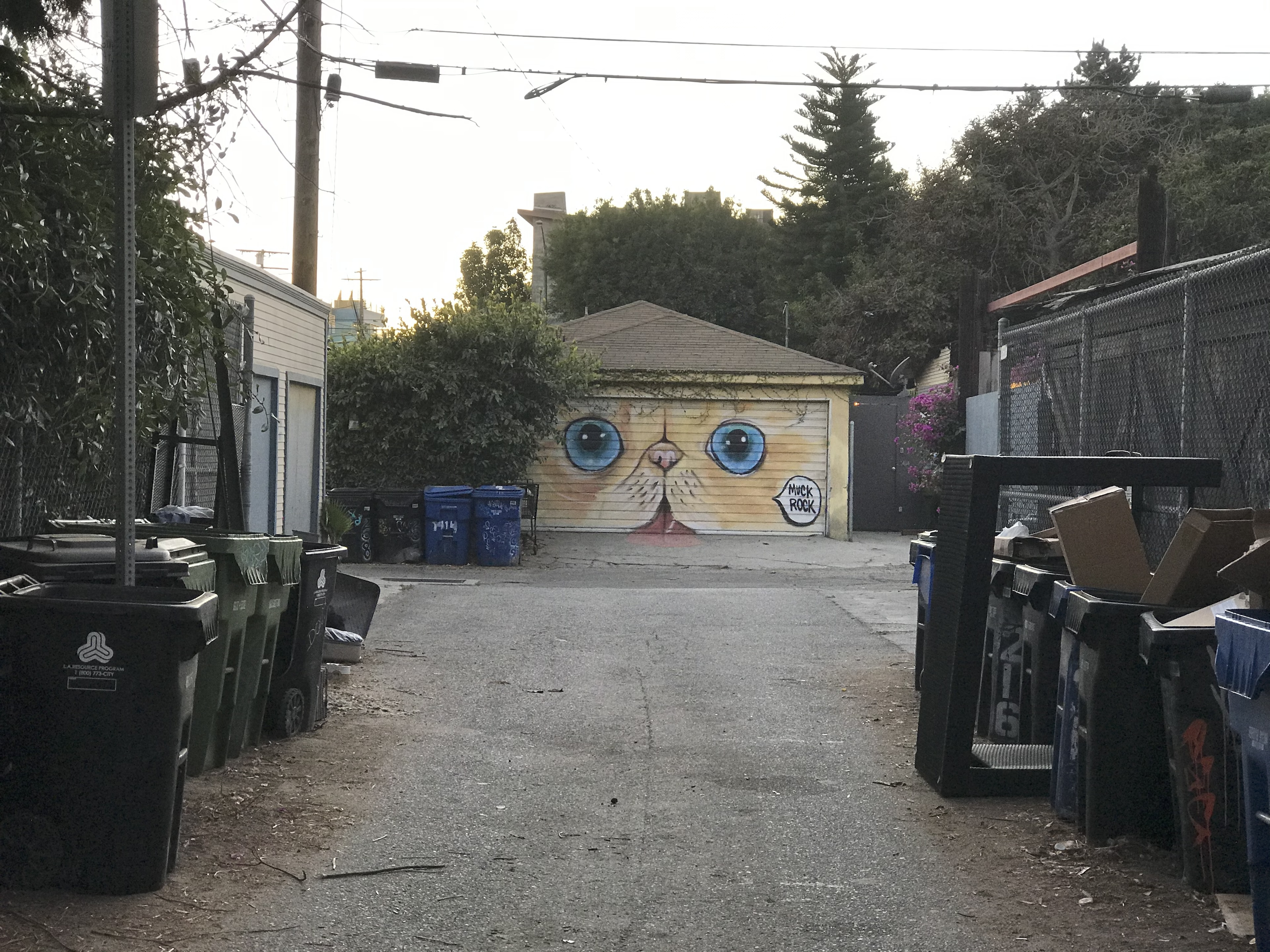

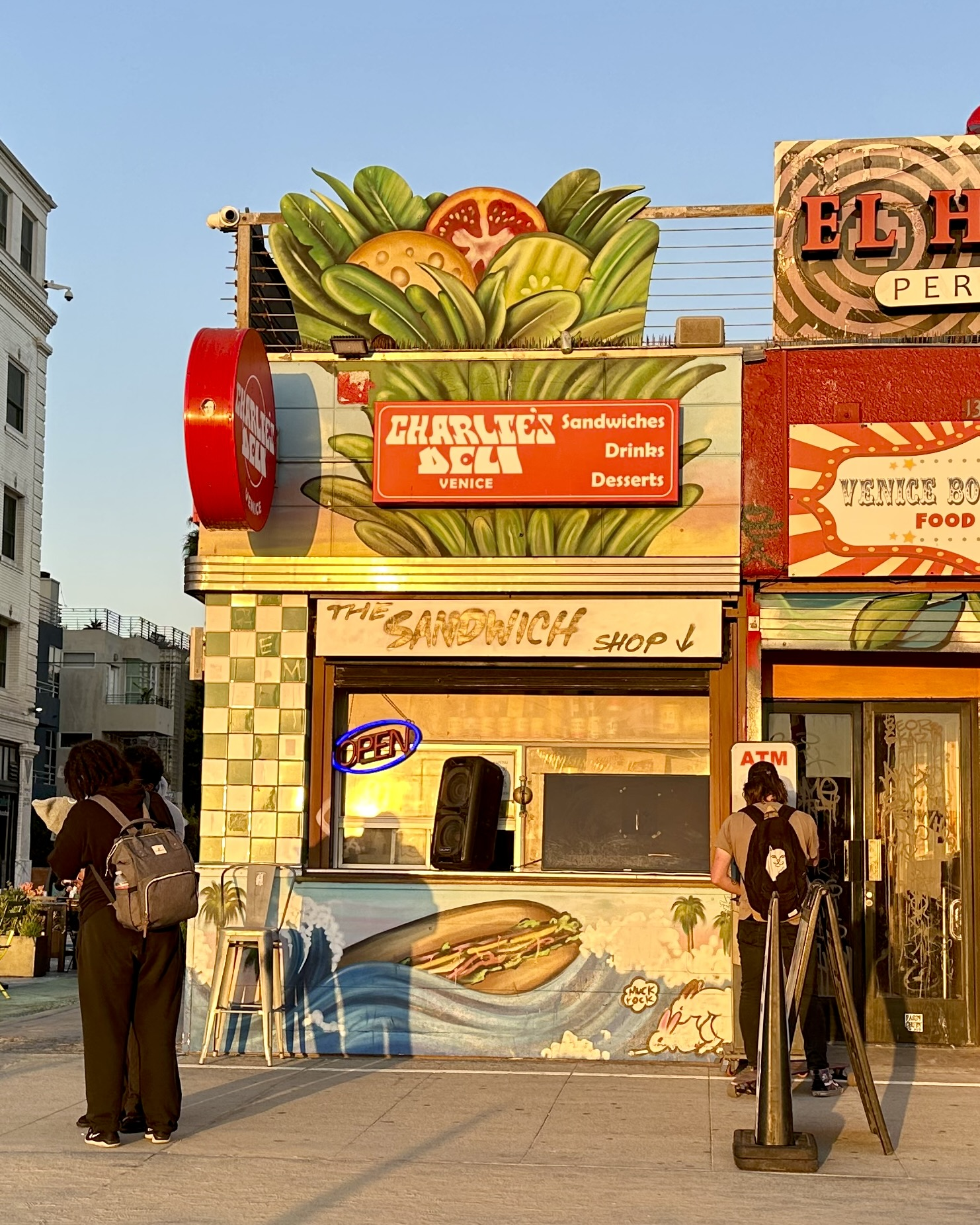

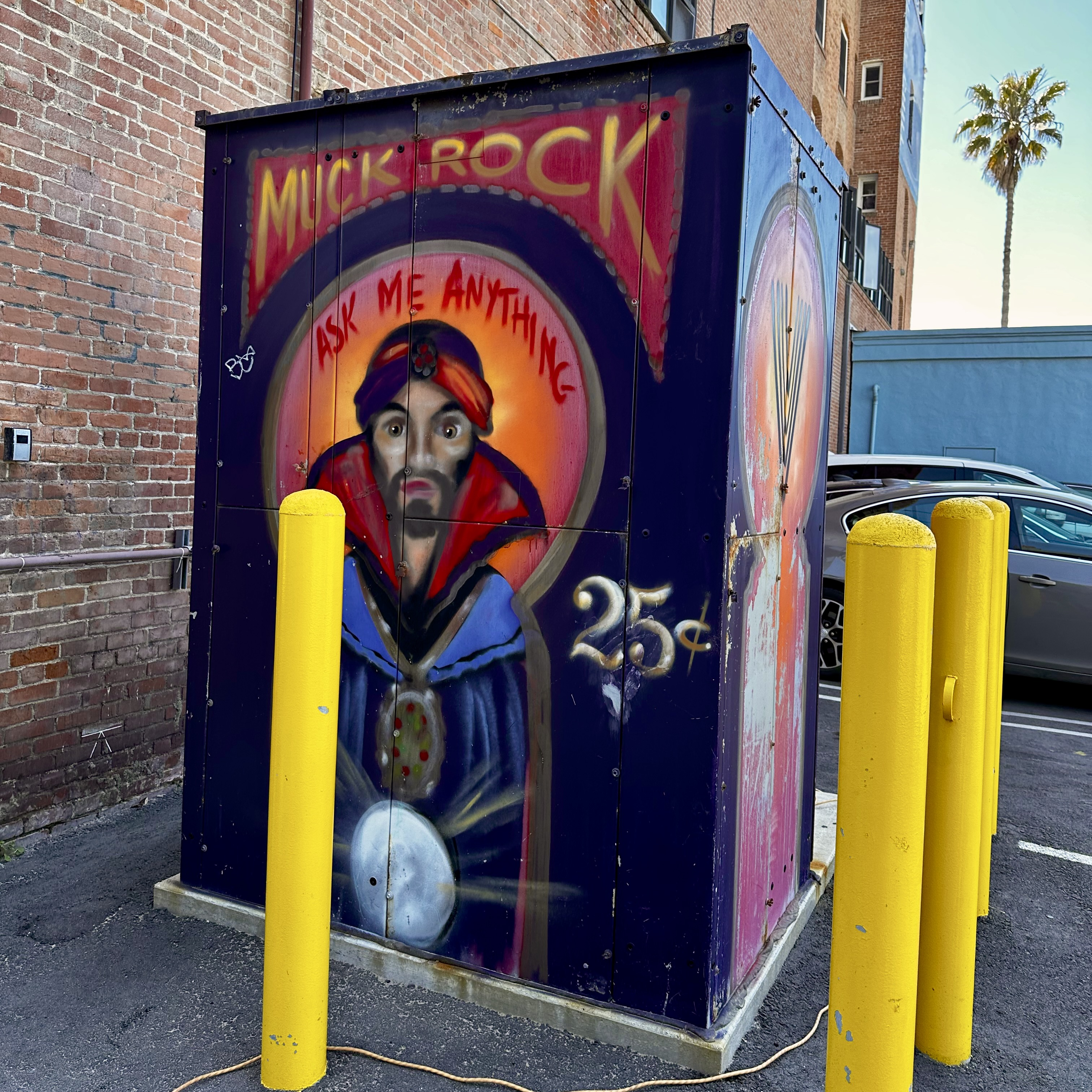
