= Lydia Emily =

Street artist

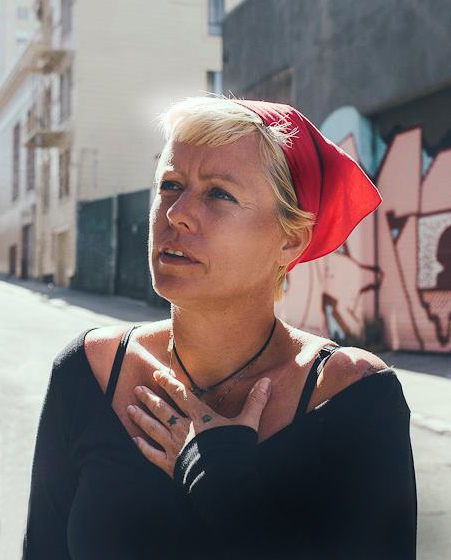
- Artist, muralist, and oil painter
- Website: Official website

Lydia Emily, a.k.a. Lydiaemily Archibald, is a street artist, muralist, and oil painter. Her signature style is realistic oil portraits with political and current themes. Her portraits are always painted on the Sunday New York Times sealed to canvas. She then translates her oil paintings into large murals in cities including New York, San Francisco, Los Angeles, Berlin, and the U.S. Virgin Islands. Lydia Emily is considered one of few prominent and prolific female street artists in a predominantly male field. In 2012 she founded The Karma Underground or TKU, a not for profit organization that advocates for a free Tibet.

== Personal life ==
Lydia Emily was born 1971 in Chicago, the youngest of two, but has lived in cities all over the world, including Berlin, Istanbul, New Orleans, and New York City. She has lived in Los Angeles since 2002 where she is raising her two daughters, her youngest has autism, and works out of her studio in Pasadena, CA. In 2012, Lydia Emily was diagnosed with multiple sclerosis. After her diagnosis, she used her work to promote awareness of multiple sclerosis. In 2021, she was the subject of a short documentary film "Lydia Emily's Last Mural", which focused on her struggle as an artist living with MS.

== Career ==
Her work has been featured nationally and worldwide, with shows in Milan, Berlin, Los Angeles, New York City, Washington DC, and San Francisco. Lydia Emily has done murals for Gucci charity Chime For Change and The Weinstein Company film Fruitvale Station the Oscar Grant Story.

In 2010 Lydia Emily was featured on Voice of Art with Pharrell Williams. GALLERIES / MUSEUMS Include: Museum of Latin American Art, LALAGallery, La Luz De Jesus Gallery LA, Red Bull Gallery, Scope Gallery Miami, Lab Art Gallery Los Angeles, ArtShare LA Gallery, Paint Berlin Germany. Pop-up Galleries in Washington DC, Milan, Italy and Haiti. Lydia Emily has done murals in Los Angeles, San Francisco, Brooklyn, Phoenix, Oakland, Saint Thomas USVI, Washington DC, Private collectors include Bob Dole and the Winston Churchill Family.

== Gallery ==
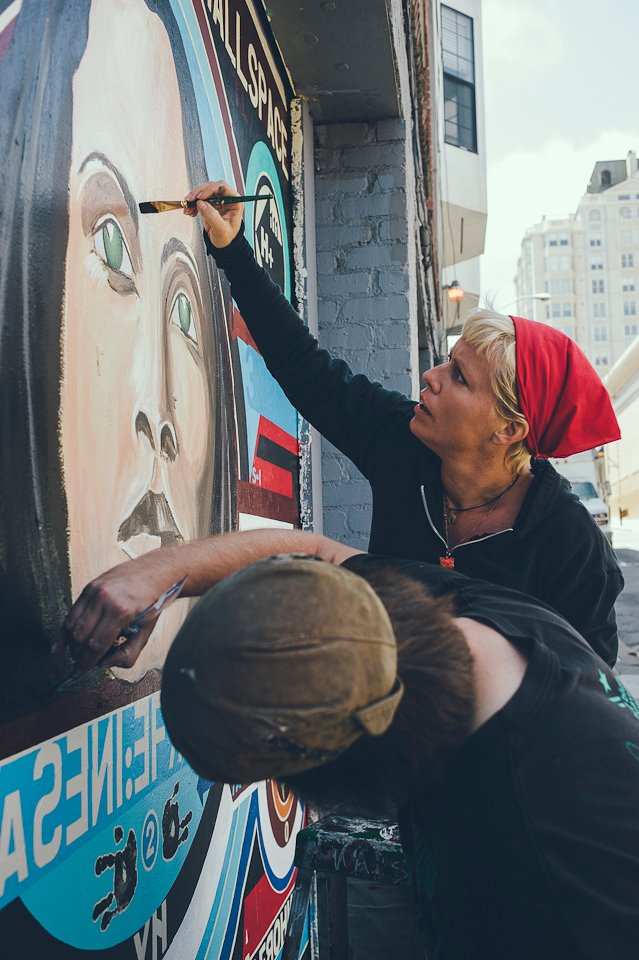
Lydia Emily teams up with D YOUNG V to paint a mural in San Francisco.

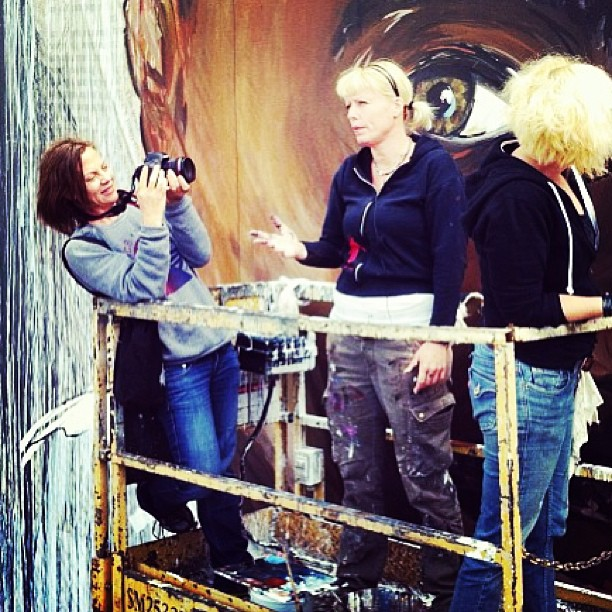
Lydia Emily gives an Interview high above the city.

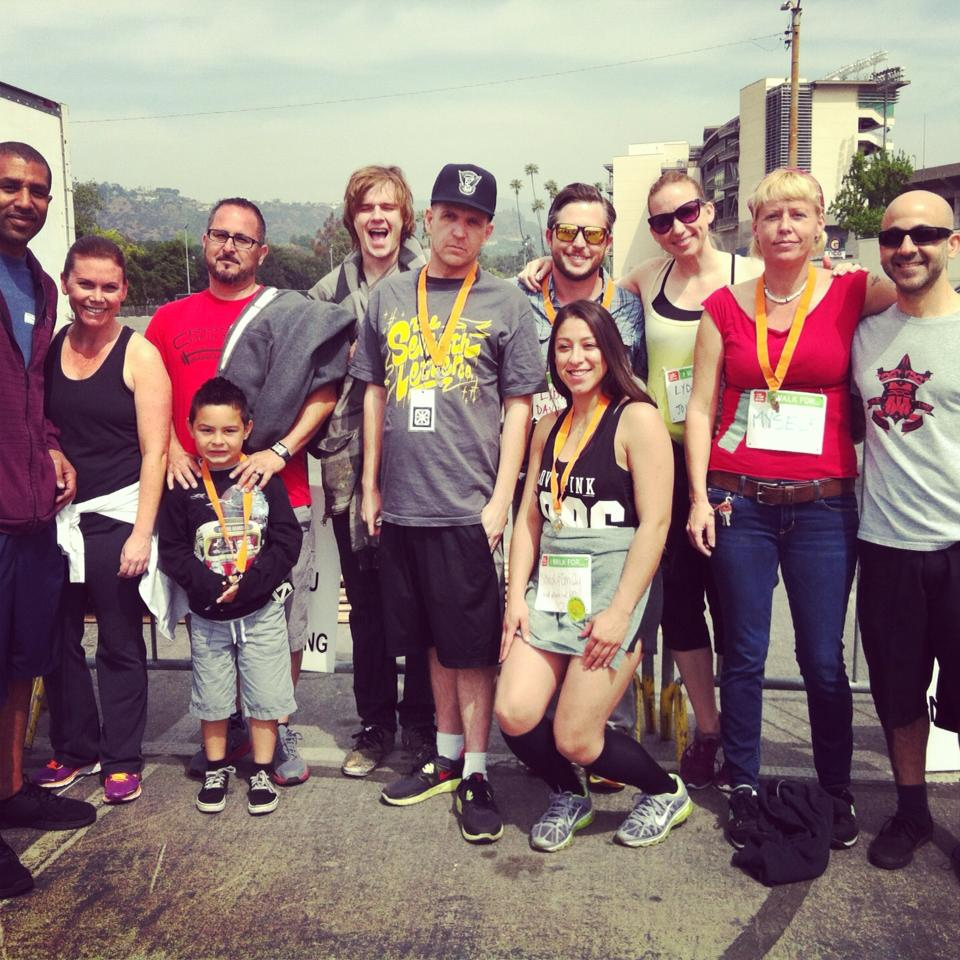
Lydia Emily Posing with Artists LeBA, Rskls, Daniel Lahoda from LaLa arts and others participating in the 7th Letter Msk Team walk in Southern California.

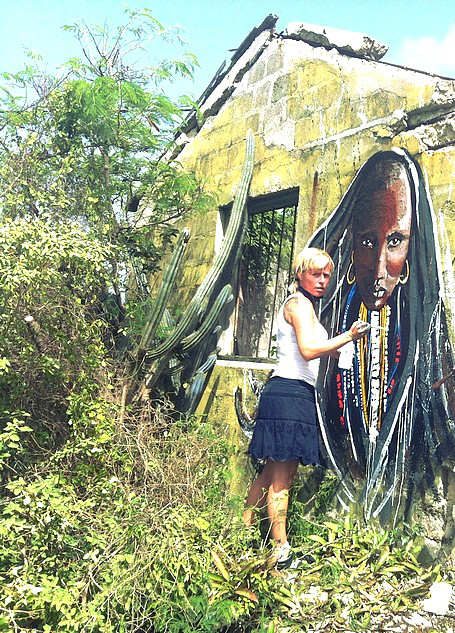
Lydia Emily painting in the Virgin Islands
