= Rabi ibn Sabra =

Rabi' ibn Sabrah al-Juhani (Arabic: ربيع بن سبرة الجهني) was among the narrators of hadith. His father (Sabrah ibn Ma'bad) is one of the companions of Muhammad, thus he was a Tabi‘in.

Rabi lived in Medina. His hadith is narrated in Sahih Muslim, and the four Sunan books. He is declared as trusted by Hadith scholars such as Nasa'i, Al-Dhahabi, Ibn Hajar and others.

Rabi had sons named Abd al-Malik ibn Rabi and Abd al-Aziz ibn Rabi.
