= Sabrah ibn Ma'bad =

Abu Suraiya Saburah ibn Ma'bad ibn 'Ausaja al-Juhani, or Sabrah ibn Ma'bad al-Juhani (Arabic: سبرة بن معبد) was one of the companions of Muhammad. Other transliterations of his name include Abu Rabi' al-Madani and Sabura al-Juhanni.

== Biography ==
=== Family ===
He was from the Juhinah tribe located around the city of Medina, Saudi Arabia. The Juhainah tribe still inhabits the area around the city of Medina today. He had a son named Rabi ibn Sabra.

=== Life ===
He lived in Medina, participated in the Battle of the Trench, and died during the rule of Mu'awiya I.

== Narrations ==
He is the source for the hadith of Sabra reporting on the prohibition of Mut'ah.
