= Rabi ibn Sabih =

Rabi ibn Sabih (Arabic: الربيع بن صبيح) (d. 160 AH) was an early Muslim and a pioneer in recording the hadith among the Sunni Muslims in Basra.

He died in Bārbud (the Arabized form of Bhadbhut), which today is a village in the Bharuch district of Gujarat, located on an inlet of the Narmada River.
