= XVALA =

American artist (born 1970)

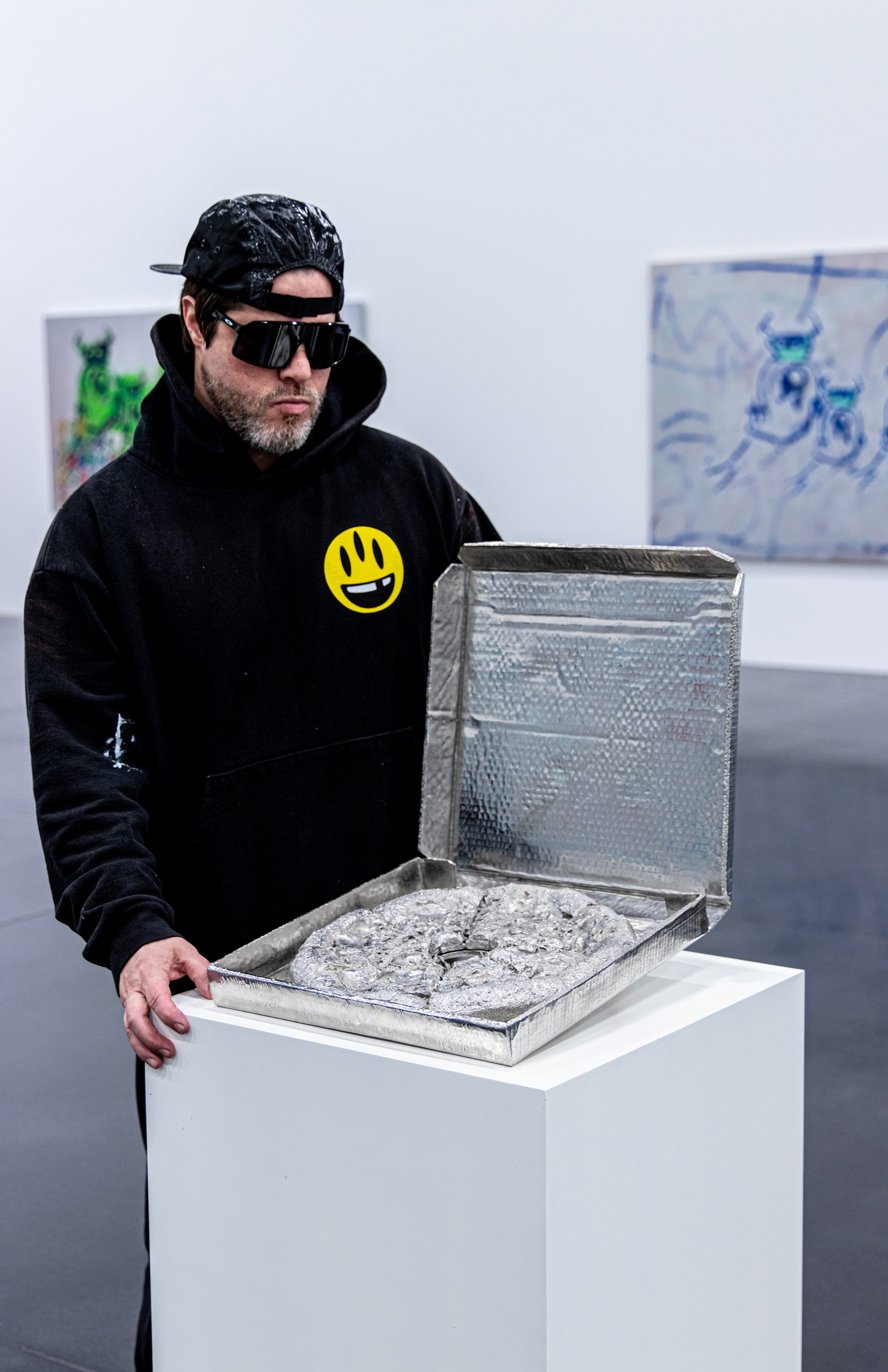
XVALA with his Big Sausage Pizza sculpture

Jeff Hamilton (born 1970), better known as XVALA, is an American contemporary artist known for using controversial celebrity images, artifacts, and references in his work and a focus on loss of privacy and other effects of technology on individuals and society.

== Personal life ==
Jeff Hamilton was born in Tulsa, Oklahoma in 1970 and graduated from Langston University in 1994. XVALA lives in the Oklahoma City, Oklahoma, area, but has worked extensively in Southern California. XVALA had a late entry into the art world, having spent most of the first 15 years of his career on other pursuits.

== Identity ==
There is some dispute as to whether Jeff Hamilton and XVALA are one and the same. XVALA has at times claimed not to be Hamilton, or that another artist was using the name, but no other artist has publicly claimed use of the name. However, the link with Jeff Hamilton is fairly well established. There has been some speculation as to whether XVALA is an acronym. However, the name "XVALA" was chosen for its uniqueness. In 2002, it was trademarked by the artist.

== Artistic style and influences ==
XVALA frequently describes his own work as belonging to the "Post-PC era". He has produced many types of art, including paintings on canvas, various types of sculptures, graffiti, wheatpasted posters with provocative captions, and more. He uses a variety of media including (but not limited to) oil sticks, acrylic paint, collage, and stencils. His sculptures are commonly made from either a mixture of recycled resin and plastic porcelain or cast metal, but other materials are sometimes used. He has a particular penchant for using found objects in his sculptures, especially when they have a celebrity connection.

XVALA has been compared to a number of prominent artists. Due to his tendency toward appropriation art, he is sometimes compared with Marcel Duchamp, Andy Warhol, and Richard Prince. He has also been compared to Banksy for his forays into street art. XVALA has said that he is inspired by Jeff Koons and Damien Hirst, as well.

== Notable works ==
=== Cultural Person Jeans ===
XVALA's first public creative work was his venture as a clothing designer. In 2002, he launched a line of designer jeans with Oklahoma City-based clothing designers Cultural Persona. The jeans were worn by a number of performers and other celebrities such as Beyonce.

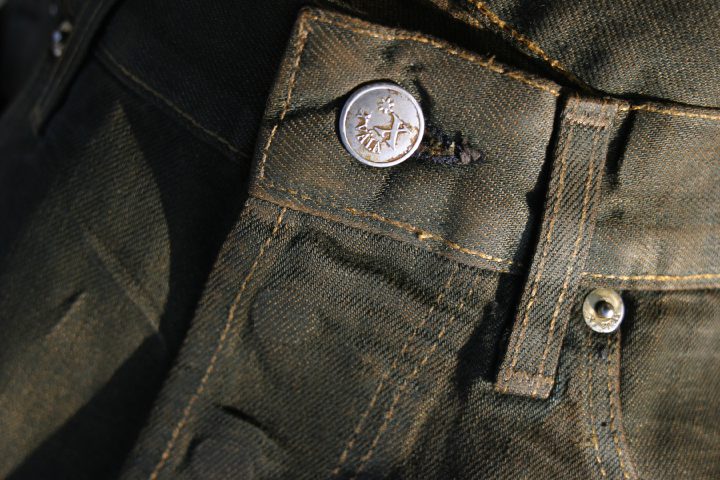
XVALA jeans button detail

=== Mainsite exhibition ===
The first significant public display of his visual art was at the December 2006 "Emergent Artists" exhibit at the Mainsite Contemporary Art Gallery in Norman, Oklahoma. At this event, he displayed four large, mixed-media paintings and several photo-serigraphs, all on canvas, and dubbed his work "tabloid art".

=== Crazy Bald ===
His interest in controversial celebrity artifacts gained notice in 2007 when he took a photo of Britney Spears, taken by paparazzo Frank Griffin shortly after she had famously shaved her head and had the image printed on archival aluminum dibond and placed in a hand-sculpted, Italian tabernacle-style frame, and titled it Crazy Bald Britney Spears: The Appeal Of The Loss Of Desirability. The piece has since been displayed in many shows and mentioned in a number of articles.

=== Brangelina house ===
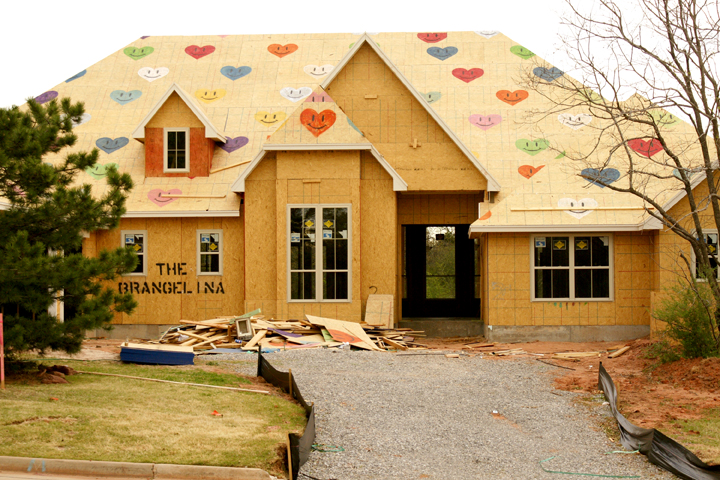
The Brangelina under construction, showing some of the underlying art

In 2008, XVALA collaborated with the sculptor Daniel Edwards to build a 4,000-square-foot, $480,000 house in Edmond, Oklahoma, inspired by the relationship of Brad Pitt and Angelina Jolie. The artists considered the house "lifestyle art" but they also want it to be a functional home.

During construction, XVALA stenciled a pattern of large smiling hearts on the roofing, as well as quotes and facts related to the Pitt-Jolie family (such as their children's names and birth dates) throughout the framing. XVALA later applied artwork to the finished interior walls as well, and the house contained two sculptures created by Edwards.

The home took 14 months to build and was completed in December 2009. Media reporting suggested the house would be sold stipulating "honorary ownership" for Pitt and Jolie, allowing them free use of the home upon request when they were in the area.

=== Street art ===
In 2010, XVALA created a poster with an image of Lindsay Lohan making an obscene gesture and the caption "thanks for the memories" [sic]. He posted it in Los Angeles near the site of her well-publicized 2005 car accident involving paparazzo. The gesture was a reference to Lohan's actions during a probation hearing on the day before the image was posted, when she had the phrase "fuck u" [sic] written on the fingernail of her left middle finger.

Later that year, XVALA created a stir in Oklahoma City when he painted graffiti on the side of the historic Hadden Hall building. The image was a stenciled face of a chimpanzee with bright pink spray-painted lipstick. It was accompanied by the caption "I'm not trying to be slutty," which was a Miley Cyrus quote.

Around this same period, XVALA was posting salacious images of Cyrus at various locations in Los Angeles. The posters bore the label "FEAR GOOGLE" in large lettering and were intended to illustrate the danger of trusting digital storage or transfer of personal information and images. The photos, showing Cyrus in the shower wearing only a long, white t-shirt, had been stolen from her email by a hacker and posted online.

Early in 2008, Banksy painted a caveman carrying a tray of fast food on a wall near the historic New Beverly Cinema in Los Angeles. Other graffiti artists, including XVALA, began adding tags and artwork to the site. In 2010, to protect Banksy's work, the area of the wall bearing his art was covered with plywood and then removed, including XVALA's art in the removed section. The section of wall was then taken to a gallery and in 2018 was auctioned.

=== Fear Google ===
In 2010, XVALA introduced his controversial Fear Google campaign, which he said was meant to "strengthen the ongoing debate over privacy in the digital era" by highlighting the ways in which we expose ourselves to the world, often unwittingly, through the indiscriminate use of technology. The campaign comprised several phases.

==== Scarlett Johansson ====
The first phase of Fear Google campaign to attrach media attention was XVALA's poster of Scarlett Johansson. In September 2011, nude photos of Scarlett Johansson were hacked and poster online. XVALA accessed the photos by way of a simple Google search. Over the next several days, he pasted poster-sized copies of the images in public areas across Los Angeles with large "Fear Google" stickers covering Johansson's buttocks and breast.

XVALA called the images a "disruptive innovation" and said that it should be regarded simply as art. He received a cease and desist letter regarding their use but considered that he was on solid legal ground because he did not hack or leak the photos himself, the photos were being used for an artistic purpose (which is potentially protected by law), and he didn't make any direct profit from the photos. Some attorneys conceded that a lawsuit against the artist would have an uncertain outcome.

==== Not Very Well Hung Hangers ====
In November 2011, after XVALA found the home addresses of tech industry pioneers Mark Zuckerberg, Larry Page, Sergey Brin, Steve Jobs, Jack Dorsey, and Jimmy Wales through Google searches. He then went to each of their homes and took items from their outdoor trash containers for use in making sculptures. He stated that he had "mined" their trash for art like their platforms mine users' data for profit. Each piece was intended to represent its former owner's work and perceived flaws in some way, and the exhibit was called "The Not Very Well Hung Hangers of Silicon Valley", the name coming from a wire hanger from Mark Zuckerberg's trash that XVALA bent into a vaguely phallic shape and painted Facebook blue. He explained the inspiration for the piece by saying, "I wanted to expose Zuckerberg like he exposes Facebook users daily."

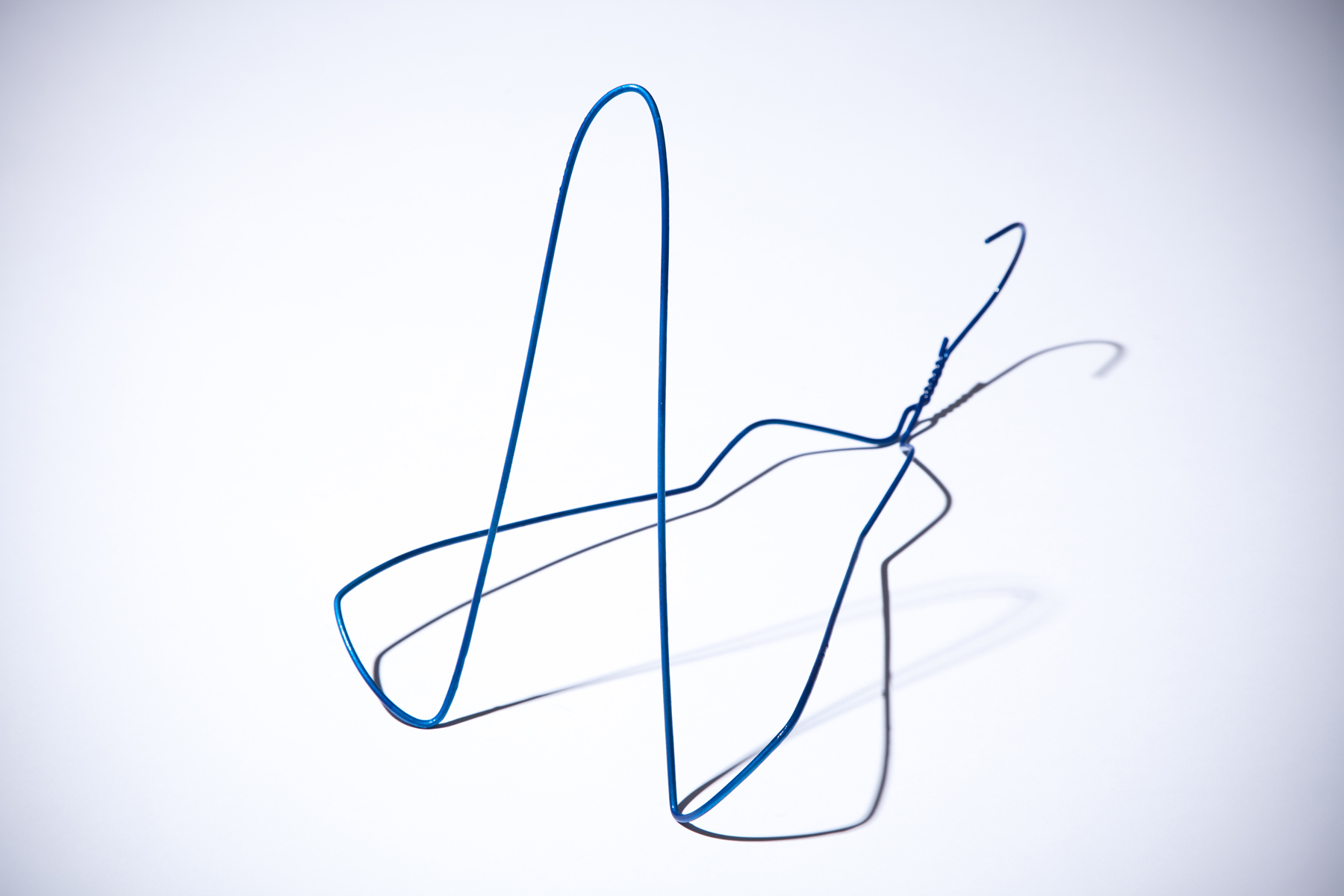
Mark Zuckerberg's Not Very Well Hung Hanger

In 2012, XVALA mixed plastic waste from Steve Jobs' trash with recycled resin and plastic porcelain and put it in a 9-inch-tall mold of the Apple CEO wearing his classic turtleneck and jeans and holding an iPhone 5. The mold had been created by the Chinese company M.I.C. Gadget but they were forced by Apple in 2010 and again in 2011 to cease production.

XVALA produced black and white versions of the Steve Job action figures. The black figures, he said, were intended to represent each of the employees who died by suicide in 2010 and 2011 as a result of the extremely poor working conditions at the Apple-contracted Foxconn plant. The figures, titled Think Different, were sold for $150–200 each. The artist hoped the symbolism and the title would encourage Apple to "think different" about their labor practices.

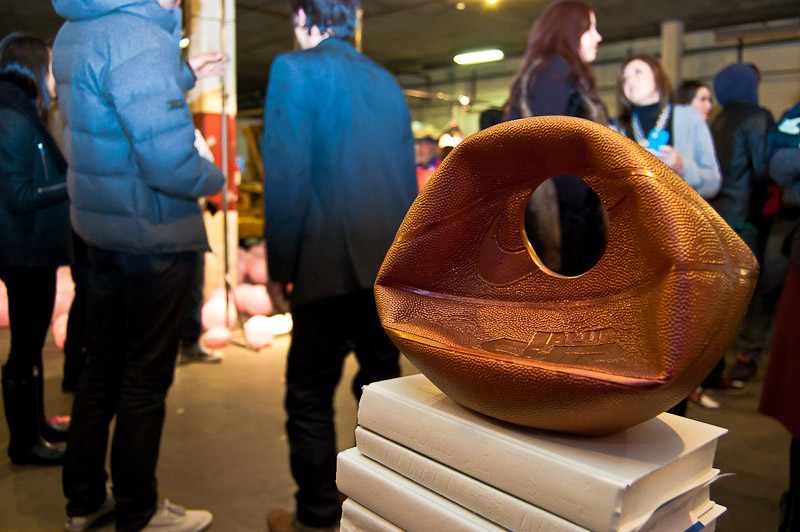
Slammed and Dunked

In addition to targeting tech pioneers, XVALA also appropriated trash items from outside the homes of celebrities. He created art from Kim Kardashian's trash in 2012, transforming a deflated basketball with her plastic waste into a sculpture he called Slammed and Dunked. The piece was inspired by Kardashian's failed marriage to NBA player Kris Humphries and was displayed at an exhibition that also included a collection of her social media selfies mounted on aluminum that also came, in part, from her trash.

Later in 2012, XVALA took a trash can from Justin Bieber's home and a milk crate from a cafeteria at Facebook, attached them together, and painted them silver to create Bieberbot. The piece was intended to represent the singer as "a monster with technology like Dr. Frankenstein and Google". The work was intended to be visual metaphor about the loss of control of personal data when technology is used indiscriminately. XVALA was quoted in a related interview as saying, "We make our trash public domain, not realizing that our trash defines us more than social media."

==== "No Delete" exhibit ====
In 2014, XVALA announced his plan to use hacked and leaked nude photos of Jennifer Lawrence and Kate Upton at his "No Delete" exhibit in St. Petersburg, Florida. The title of the exhibit was intended to be "a comment on the inability to erase private information from the Internet's collective memory once it is exposed".

Representatives of the two actresses issued public statements warning that "authorities have been contacted and will prosecute anyone who posts the stolen photos of Jennifer Lawrence" and that Kate Upton intended "to pursue anyone disseminating or duplicating these illegally obtained images to the fullest extent possible". The FBI also announced that it was "addressing the matter" and Apple that it was "investigating".

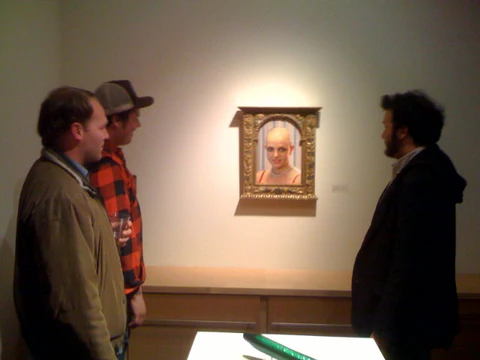
Crazy Bald Britney Spears: The Appeal Of The Loss Of Desirability on display in Oklahoma

XVALA, however, believed that he had the right to display the photos because he had not stolen or leaked them himself, and because he was using them as art and announced plans to exhibit them on canvas. Legal experts pointed out that, even though he did not directly steal the images, he was ultimately profiting from stolen property. They argued that the best recourse was to claim copyright violation as the photos were taken by, or at the direction of, the celebrities themselves. Attorneys also questioned whether XVALA's use of the photos in their unaltered state was transformative enough to qualify as fair use. Others highlighted XVALA's choice of Florida for the exhibition, despite previously working almost exclusively in Southern California where the state has a strict prohibition on exhibiting nude photos without the consent of the subject.

In addition to the legal issues, the announcement was met with backlash from the public at large. It was denounced by the media and prompted multiple protests, petitions, and boycotts. Various celebrities spoke in support of the women whose images were stolen, with Andrew Garfield specifically asking, "What fucking right does [XVALA] have to do that?" and calling the exhibition "absolutely revolting". The exhibit did, however, have some support.

XVALA denied that the exhibit was intended to be exploitative and argued that, on the contrary, it was meant to foster discussion about the nature of fame and celebrity, especially with relation to questions of privacy, security, and content ownership. However, a week later he relented and announced that he would not use the stolen photos. Instead, he substituted self-shot, life-size photos of his own semi-naked body in the exhibit.

=== Meme Ranch ===
XVALA's most recent focus has been on memes, particularly their origins and impact on society, in an ongoing project titled Meme Ranch. The project consists of a number of collections and individual works.

==== Big Sausage Pizza ====
A key piece from the project is an 80-pound, solid high-chromium stainless steel sculpture titled Big Sausage Pizza. The sculpture which was made from a mold of an open Pizza Hut pizza box. The piece was apparently inspired by the work of Jeff Koons, particularly the latter's Rabbit sculpture. XVALA has suggested that the reflections cast by the box represent the distortion and reshaping of culture by the memes that it adopts and transmits.

==== The Pandemic Paintings ====
Beginning in 2020, XVALA created a collection called The Pandemic Paintings, representing distinctive aspects of life during the COVID-19 pandemic. Examples include bots, Karens, pizza delivery, and the Kim Jong Un death rumors. To express the idea that the world's wealthiest people amassed more wealth during the pandemic XVALA highlighted increasing luxury from societal breakdown through large, elaborate paintings with titles such as Show Me the Money: Ultra Luxury Edition and GUCCI Gang, combining luxury items and designer goods with a street art-inspired style.

==== MAGA hat ====
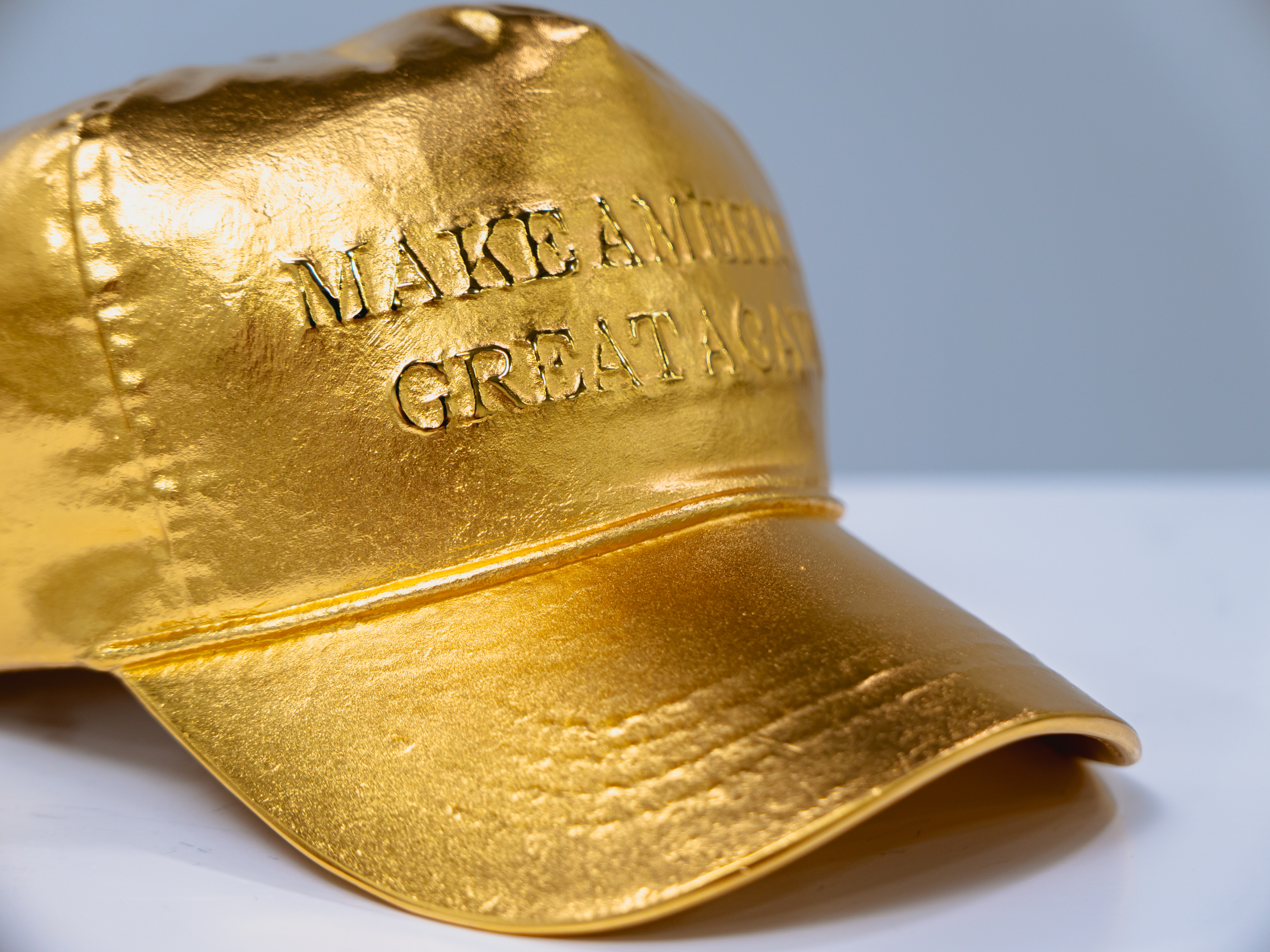
XVALA's gold MAGA hat

In the lead up to the 2024 US elections, XVALA created a sculpture from a MAGA hat as part of the Meme Ranch project. He scanned a hat signed by Donald Trump, 3-D printed it, and used the printed copy to create a mold. He then cast a bronze copy of the cap and plated it with 24-karat gold. His intention was to combine the general MAGA meme with classic bronze sculptures. It is also intended as a response to Maurizio Cattelan's America - a functioning toilet made from solid 18-karat gold. However, while Cattelan envisions America as a place to dispose of waste, XVALA's MAGA cap encourages the viewer to think of America as great.

The work was unveiled at the 2024 Conservative Political Action Conference (CPAC) in Washington, D.C. It has since been displayed at other conservative political events, including the 2024 Republican National Convention (RNC) in Milwaukee, Wisconsin and an event at the Trump National Golf Club in Bedminster, New Jersey.

== Reception ==
Reactions to XVALA's work vary.

=== Criticism ===
His harshest criticism came in relation to the intended release of nude photos of Jennifer Lawrence and Kate Upton. Haley Blum of USAToday wrote, "We get the idea [of the photos being used as art], kind of, but we can't shake the creepiness of it all." More outspoken writers called the idea "the nastiest reaction... tabloid trash", a "ridiculously terrible idea", weak, gross, unoriginal, "stunt art", and one of the angriest called it "a shameless bid for attention and relevance, and probably money... exploitative, opportunistic, misogynistic, voyeuristic nonsense masquerading as art... [and] totally uninteresting". However, Lennie Bennett of the Tampa Bay Times pointed out that Andy Warhol and Marcel Duchamp created highly shocking and even offensive pieces at times too, and that "[it] might be lousy, irritating or offensive, but intent establishes its categorization and the intent of these works is art."

=== Praise ===
XVALA's work receives accolades, as well. One gallery called his work "dystopian [but with] a future-facing aesthetic to represent both the here and now and all that remains beyond".

A reporter on his Bieberbot show said XVALA's work "might make you scratch your head at first, but then it becomes the work of genius". The writer went on to say of one painting, "[It] burned my mind with the shape of aliens and the future yet to come. I think this piece will be important one day."

Even the executive vice-president of the development company restoring a historic building targeted by XVALA's art said, while also decrying graffiti as vandalism, "We're flattered such an acclaimed artist decided to perform his or her art on our property."

== See also ==
- Imagery of nude celebrities
- iCloud leaks of celebrity photos
