= Ahmed Rabee El Sheikh =

Egyptian footballer (born 1993)

Personal information
- Full name: Ahmed Rabee El Sheikh
- Date of birth: June 1, 1993 (age 33)
- Position: Goalkeeper

Team information
- Current team: Smouha
- Number: 25

Youth career
- –2016: Al-Ahly

Senior career*
Years	Team	Apps	(Gls)
2016–2019	Tanta	3	(0)
2019–	Smouha		
- * Club domestic league appearances and goals as of 15 October 2017

Ahmed Rabee El Sheikh (Arabic: أحمد ربيع الشيخ; born June 1, 1993) is an Egyptian professional footballer who currently plays as a goalkeeper for the Egyptian club Smouha.
