= CYRCLE =

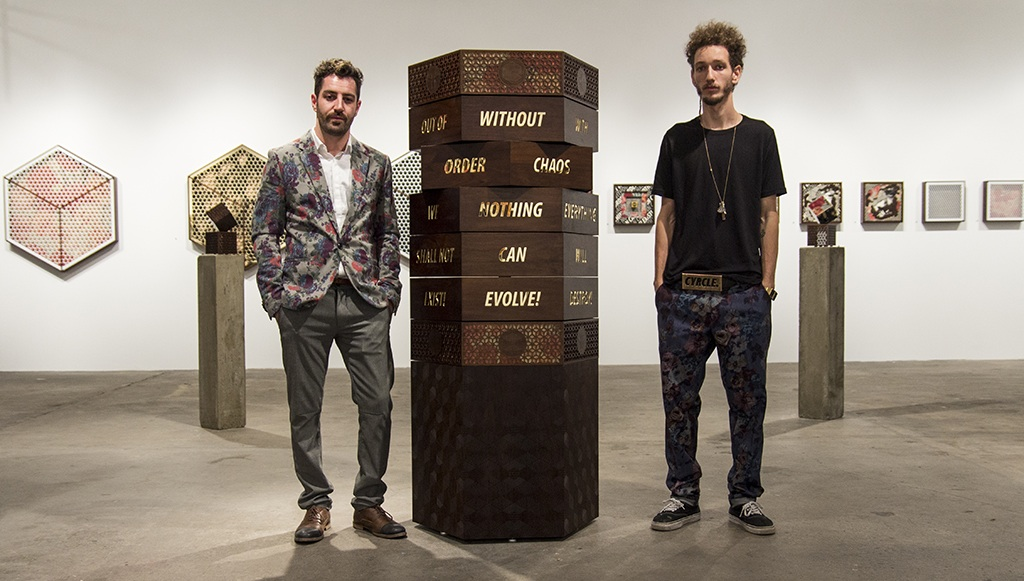
- David Leavitt and David "Rabi" Torres, 2012
- Known for: Fine art, installation art, sculpture, muralism, photography, typography
- Website: www.cyrcle.com

CYRCLE was a collective made up of American artists David Leavitt (Davey Detail), David Torres (RABI), and Devin Liston. The collective was formed in Los Angeles, California in 2010.

== History ==
David Leavitt, David "Rabi" Torres, and Devin Liston formed CYRCLE formed as an art collective on October 8, 2010.

They participated with James Lavelle for his “Daydreaming With” show in 2012 in Hong Kong. Liston left in 2012.

In September 2012, the duo painted what is said to be one of the largest murals on record, standing in Los Angeles. The piece titled, MAGIC IS REAL! is 11,000 square feet and sits on the walls of Bedrock Studios, located in Echo Park.

Their second solo exhibition, ORGANIZED CHAOS! was held in Los Angeles two months later and used the bee and the flower as a metaphor for the relationship between art and society as a whole. Inviting the viewer to interact with the artwork itself, various pieces were made up of cubes which could be arranged in different positions. The exhibition ran from November 2012 - December 2012.

In June 2013, CYRCLE returned to Hong Kong for a group exhibition titled, Work In Progress. The exhibition was held in a large vacant office space in Tai Koo Place and saw seven international groups and seven local artists create works using the walls and empty office as a blank canvas. CYRCLE contributed large painted murals, which explored stereotypes in the form of Cowboys and Indians.

2013 the collective traveled to Lisbon, Portugal for their show titled, CAPTURE THE FLAG! CONQUER THE DIVIDE!, at Underdogs Gallery. This exhibition studied the struggle of nations told through an American perspective. The exhibition featured a large-scale sculptural piece that flipped the meaning of the American flag and one that helps re-examine the meaning of American history and its "origin mythology". This showing was part of the Underdogs platform which ran till August 2013.

Late 2013, CYRCLE completed a three-part series, CAPTURE THE FLAG!, with their exhibition, CAPTURE THE FLAG! HOME IS WHERE YOUR HEART IS!. A solo show comprised mixed-media works referencing Cowboys and Indians, and narratives of creative expression and liberation. The exhibition ran from October 2013 - November 2013 at Above Second Gallery.

CYRCLE collaborated with musician Woodkid on a large-scale mural located in the Hollywood intersection of Santa Monica Boulevard and Highland Avenue. The work explored the aesthetic and concept of Woodkid's music with his signature keys and lyrics.

CYRCLE returned in March 2014, to do their first UK solo exhibition, OVERTHRONE: POORING REIGN!, at StolenSpace Gallery. The aim of the work, according to CYRCLE, was “to overthrow the powers of doubt and oppression in the mind so we, the individual, can let go of fear and take power back!”

In May 2014, CYRCLE present their mural “Collapse Part 1″ as part of Artscape Festival in Malmö, Sweden. Continuing their OVERTHRONE! campaign, the mural was painted on the side of the Modern Art Museum, “Moderna Museet Malmo.” This work is the first in a series that will continue to expand as the collective continues to travel across Western Europe.
