= Ben Moore (curator) =

British art curator, entrepreneur and artist

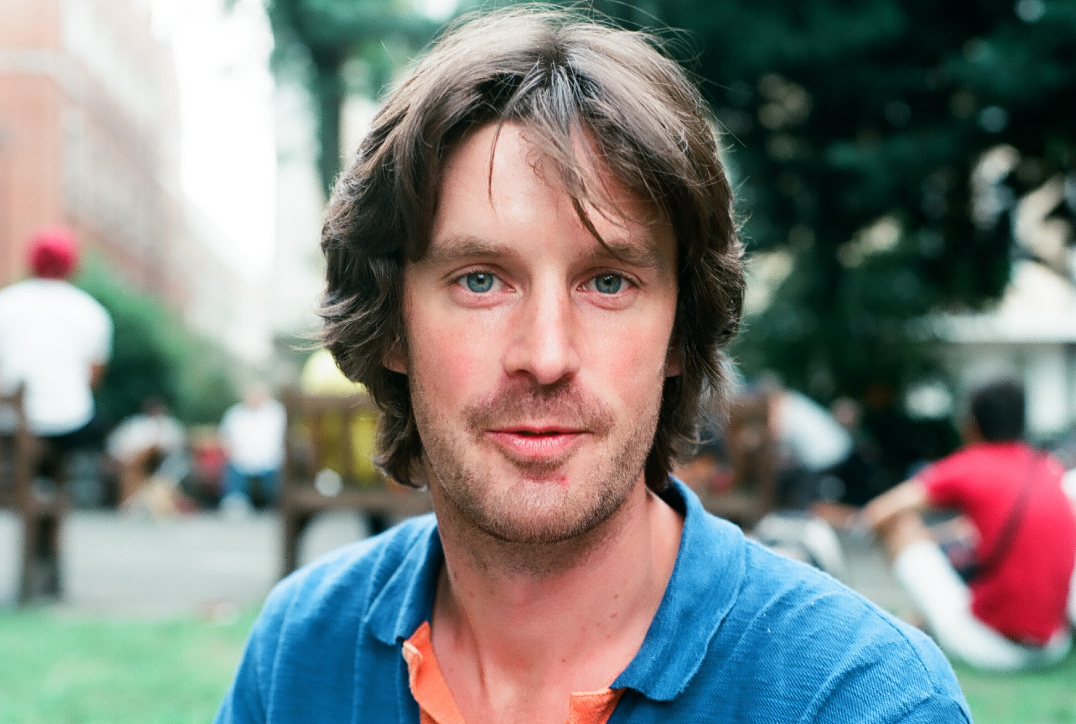
- Born: Benjamin Neel Critchley Moore; 25 May 1978 (age 48); England
- Education: Emanuel School
- Occupations: Founder & curator, Art Below & Art Wars
- Years active: 2006–present

Benjamin Neel Critchley Moore (born 25 May 1978) is a British art curator, entrepreneur and artist. He is the founder and curator of Art Below, a contemporary art organisation that places art in public places and has had shows in England, Germany, Japan and the United States. He is also the founder and curator of Art Wars, an exhibition of designs based on the Imperial Stormtrooper helmets from Star Wars. In 2021, Moore was part of the Art Wars NFT project which resulted in massive losses for the purchasers of the NFTs and claims of copyright theft from artists whose physical work was reproduced without their permission.

== Early life and education ==
Moore was born and raised in England, and attended Emanuel School in London. He studied film production at university. His father was an officer in the Royal Marines.

== Career ==
=== Art Below ===
Moore founded Art Below in 2006 to present contemporary art on space traditionally used for advertising in London Underground stations. The collective has since grown into an annual display showcasing established and emerging artists, and has collaborated with charities, universities, government and art organisations, with an aim to display progressive and provocative artwork. For a fee, it allows artists to display their artwork on billboard space in the Underground, in line with Moore's belief that people should have the right to display their work in public. Moore has curated and produced exhibits for Art Below in London, Berlin, Tokyo, Los Angeles and New Orleans. Art Below exhibits have included works by Banksy, Alison Jackson, Charles Bronson, Ben Eine, Antony Micallef, Mat Collishaw, Julie Umerle, Sarah Maple, Johan Andersson, Polly Morgan, Billy Childish, LUAP and Julie Verhoeven.

In 2010, Art Below, in collaboration with Art Barter, presented the Pillar of Art project, where advertising pillars adorned with art were placed in different neighborhoods in Berlin. It included the works of Berlin-based artists Jonathan Monk, Uwe Henneken, Saâdane Afif, and Haralampi G. Oroschakoff.

In 2010, Art Below joined with Peace Strike to create a series of plinth art installations promoting peace in Parliament Square by the Palace of Westminster in London. The first installation, in February 2011, was by special effects artist Tristan Schoonraad, who created a 3D installation depicting child soldiers. In addition to curating the installation, Moore also created an oil painting for it.

A 2010 Art Below exhibit included an installation of Banksy's work at London Bridge station which was then visited and "modified" by a graffiti artist. The work Forgive Us Our Trespassing by Banksy was reworked and issued without the halo dripping with paint over the boy's head, to promote his film Exit Through the Gift Shop. The public transport company Transport for London (TfL) had forbidden the inclusion of the halo on the poster, fearing it would give the impression of graffiti in the underground. A few days after the work was up, the halo was repainted, prompting the TfL to remove the posters.

In 2011, Art Below teamed up with the Saatchi Gallery to showcase the work of the 20 finalists of the 2011 New Sensations prize, on all the billboard space on an entire platform at the Regent's Park tube station leading up to that year's Frieze Art Fair.

In 2011, Art Below launched Art in Motion, which showcases short films and animations presented on screens in the London Underground.

Art Below has commissioned portraits to be featured as posters in the tube in tribute to Londoners including Amy Winehouse and Bernie Katz. Art Below organized projects with the City and Guilds of London Art School, including Art Lift, where the work of students was displayed in the Kennington Underground station.

In 2016, Moore curated Queen Themed, an exhibition of contemporary portraits of Queen Elizabeth II on the occasion of her 90th birthday. Opening at The Tabernacle in London, some of the works were also displayed at London Underground tube stations. It included work by Gavin Turk, Chris Levine, Mr. Brainwash and Goldie. Also in 2016, Art Below celebrated 10 years of exhibitions on the London Underground by showing a selection of their posters, curated by Moore.

In 2017, as part of Art Below's subway series, Anish Kapoor's reworking of Joseph Beuys' 1974 performance art piece I Like America and America Likes Me was unveiled at Union Station in Los Angeles, California. Kapoor titled his self-portrait I Like America and America Doesn't Like Me as a protest against the immigration policies of US President Donald Trump's administration.

In 2017, Art Below launched their first billboard event, with works by 28 artists in Los Angeles' Union Station. The exhibition included work by Kelly "RISK" Graval, Karen Bystedt, D*Face, Alison Jackson, and Hayden Kays.

In June 2018 Art Below featured their Summer Show as part of Mayfair Art Weekend and exhibited artist work on billboards at the Hyde Park Corner tube station, along with a group show at Herrick Gallery. In January 2019, Art Below returned to Hyde Park Corner and the Herrick Gallery.

In 2020, Art Below put on the exhibition Every Day is a Miracle at the Ad Lib Gallery in London. The exhibit was composed of works that had appeared in Art Below exhibits over the past 15 years, since its inception in 2006.

=== Art Wars ===
In 2013, Moore teamed up with the charity Missing People to produce Art Wars, an exhibition featuring designs based on the Imperial Stormtrooper helmets and body armour from the Star Wars films. Fourteen artists created replicas and re-imaginings of the helmets, including Damien Hirst, D*Face, David Bailey, Jake and Dinos Chapman, Mr. Brainwash, and Yinka Shonibare. Moore contributed to the exhibit with a melted down and crushed acrylic-capped Stormtrooper helmet. Andrew Ainsworth, who worked on the original Stormtrooper suit, donated a helmet cast from the original 1976 moulds for the artists to use. The exhibit premiered at the Saatchi Gallery in London on 9 October 2013, and posters of the helmets were then displayed by Art Below on billboards at the Regent's Park tube station. A mobile app allowed users to view the designs in 3D. Since 2013, Art Wars has gone on tour to Sweden, Dubai, Miami and Los Angeles, exhibiting work from artists including Anish Kapoor, Retna, and Philip Colbert.

In December 2016, Moore curated Art Wars Rogue One Exhibition in London, featuring helmets by Anish Kapoor, D*Face and six other artists.

In 2017, Art Wars travelled to Miami as part of Miami Art Week, and to Los Angeles at Sur Le Mur Gallery, with work from artists including Retna, Blek le Rat, Daniel Lismore and Chemical X.

A collaboration between Ben Moore and Mark Hix, Art Wars East at the Hix Art Gallery in 2018 exhibited a selection of new Art Wars works by artists including Ben Eine, Joana Vasconcelos, Philip Colbert, Joe Rush, Miranda Donovan, Lauren Baker, Will Teather, Carne Griffiths, and Orlanda Broom.

=== Art Wars NFT ===
In 2021, Moore was involved in the Art Wars NFT project. The project was launched November 2021 by Ben Moore, Bran Symondson and US-based developer, DeFi Network, but soon attracted headlines when some of high-profile artists responsible for the tokens in the collection that had a physical counterpart (including Jake & Dinos Chapman, RoyalUrbanArt, Anish Kapoor, Damien Hirst, Hayden Kays, Antony Micalef, Chemical X, Ben Eine, Paul Fryer, Orlanda Broom, Unskilled Worker, Blek Le Rat, David Bailey, the estate of Nancy Fouts and RYCA) clarified that their permission had not been sought for the NFTs and that Moore knew that he did not own the rights to their work. The project reportedly generated $7.5m in sales but subsequently the NFTs became worthless.

=== Stations of the Cross ===
Art Below's 2014 exhibition Stations of the Cross featured depictions of the Passion of Christ by 14 artists, including Mat Collishaw, Antony Micallef, Polly Morgan, Wolfe Lienkewicz, Nancy Fouts, and Sebastian Horsley. The exhibition opened at London's St Marylebone Parish Church on 6 March 2014, and ran for 40 days, coinciding with Lent. To coincide with the exhibition, Art Below showcased selected works on billboard space throughout the London Underground at stations that have a symbolic link with the theme. The exhibition returned in 2015 with works by 20 artists, including a life-sized sculpture of a crucified Pete Doherty, called For Pete's Sake. A collaboration between Doherty, Nick Reynolds and Schoony, it was created in 2008 and publicly displayed for the first time at Stations of the Cross at St Marylebone Parish Church in 2015, curated by Moore.

In March 2018, Moore curated Stations of the Cross at St Stephen Walbrook church, with the exhibit including depictions of the crucifixion by Francis Bacon, Paul Benney and Ricardo Cinalli. One of the artworks on display was a life-size sculpture by street artist RYCA (Ryan Callanan) of a stormtrooper being crucified, resulting in some controversy and the sculpture being moved to a less prominent position in the exhibition.

=== Other work ===
In 2010, Moore was commissioned by the Royal Institute of British Architects to create a stop motion film of the "Three Classicists" exhibition, a large architectural drawing by Ben Peantreath, Francis Terry and George Saumarez Smith. That same year, Moore was commissioned to make the documentary A Day in the Life of Dan for the Royal British Legion. The 28-minute film premiered at the East End Film Festival on Remembrance Day.

In 2013, Moore curated Thatcheristic, an exhibit featuring 10 artists' depictions of former UK Prime Minister Margaret Thatcher in alternatives to how she has typically been portrayed (including as Queen Victoria and as the Virgin Mary). The exhibit opened at Gallery Different in London on 17 April 2013, the day of Thatcher's funeral. Participating artists included Moore, Harry Pye, Peter Kennard and Nasser Azam.

Moore founded the Missing Tom Fund, an organization raising money in search of his older brother Tom, who suffers from mental health issues and went missing in 2003. Many of the art exhibits he curates partially benefit the Missing Tom Fund.

Moore was curator-in-residence for the arts program at Re:Centre in London from July 2018 to February 2019.

Unmissable is an exhibition of portraits of missing people curated by Moore, as commissioned by the Missing People charity to mark their 25th anniversary. The series of 25 portraits by 25 artists was unveiled at The Other Art Fair in London, hosted by Saatchi Art in March 2019. Exhibiting artists included Charming Baker, Samira Addo, Ian Bruce, Carne Griffiths, Nina Fowler, and Will Teather.

In 2019, Moore curated One Small Step, an exhibition celebrating the 50th anniversary of the Apollo 11 Moon landing that took place in July 1969. The exhibition at The Other Art Fair in London featured 12 artists - Anish Kapoor, Joana Vasconcelos, Alison Jackson, D*Face, Mr. Brainwash, Bran Symondson, UnSKilled Worker, Philip Colbert, Hayden Kays, Ben Eine, Dan Baldwin, and Chris Levine - representing the 12 men who have walked on the Moon since 1969, with each artist transforming an astronaut helmet into an art piece. All proceeds went to Mines Advisory Group.

In 2021, Moore curated Art in the Age of Now, a multidisciplinary group show at Fulham Town Hall in London designed to celebrate resilience. It featured artists including Liam Hayhow, Sam Haggerty, MC Llamas, Joe Rush, Charlotte Colbert, and Mr. Doodle.

In 2021, Moore curated Me, My Brain and I, an exhibition at The Other Art Fair, with the artworks auctioned to benefit the charity Parkinson's UK. It included brain sculptures designed by a variety of artists, including Schoony, Alex Echo, Tracey Emin, Gavin Turk, David Bailey, Jake and Dinos Chapman, and Conrad Shawcross.

== Honors ==
- Listed on ArtLyst's Art PowerLyst 100, 2013, 2015, 2017
