= Ben Eine =

English artist

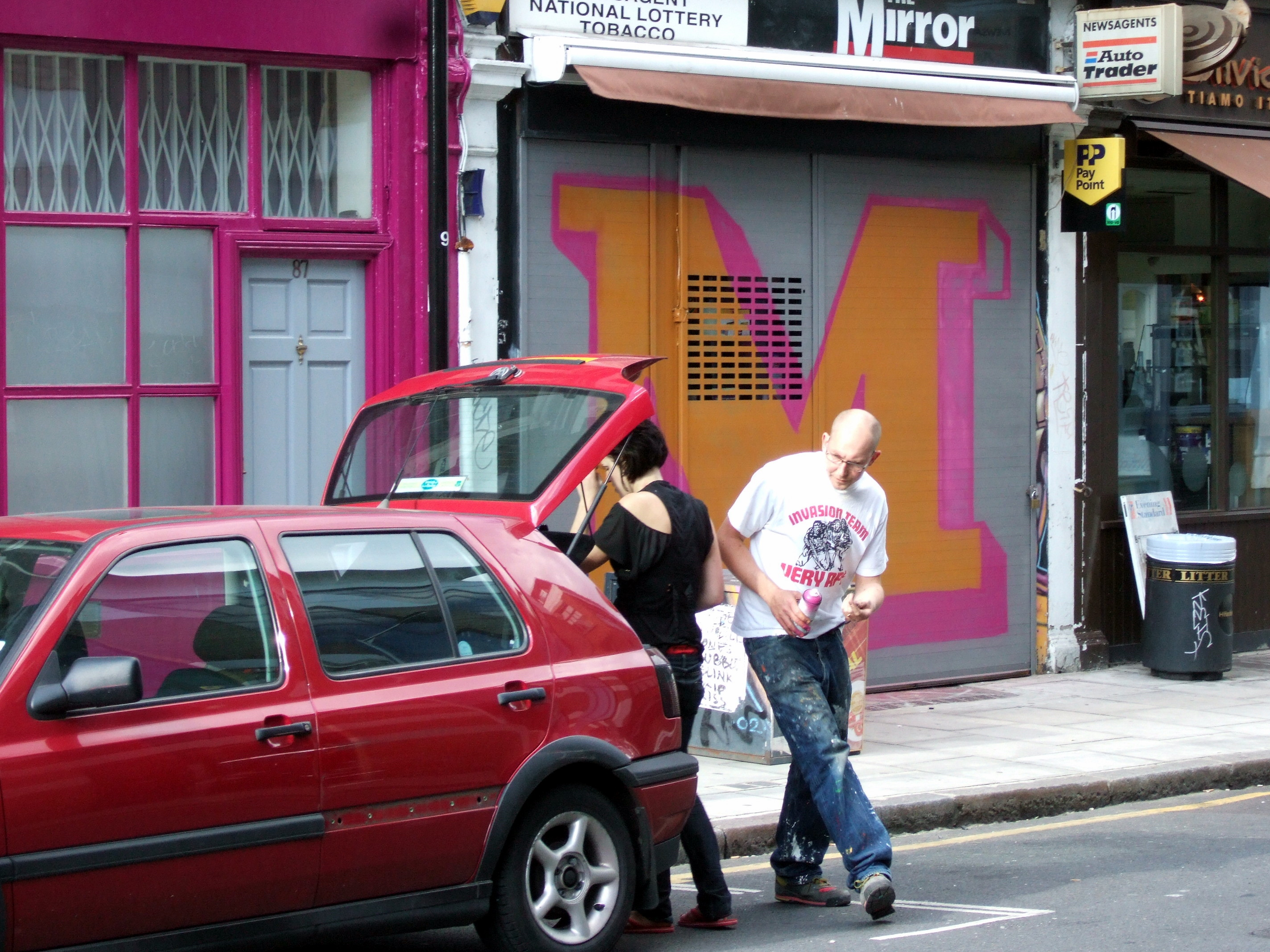
- Eine whilst painting an 'M' on a newsagent, 2007
- Born: Benjamin Flynn; August 23, 1970 (age 56); London, England
- Website: beneine.co.uk

Benjamin Flynn (born 23 August 1970), known professionally as Eine, is an English artist based in London.

== Career ==
Eine became prominent for his alphabet lettering on shop shutters. To make them easier to locate, some of these letters have been mapped. He has also taken his lettering to the streets of Paris, Stockholm, Hastings and Newcastle upon Tyne.

In a workshop above the Dragon Bar on Leonard Street in London (since demolished), Eine began exploring cheaper routes. Eine started experimenting with screen printing and produced a number of unique apparel designs, most notably some "VANDALS" sweatshirts. He later established the cult screen print company Pictures On Walls (POW) with Banksy. Eine developed a significant amount of hand-pulled prints for POW artists, including Jamie Hewlett, Mode2, Modern Toss and David Shrigley. He was able to enhance other artists' work precisely due to his natural talent for combining colors. In 2008, he quit his job to concentrate on his own independent career.

Eine's neon and black EINE stickers (several EINE names) became prevalent in East London, and he also contributed to sticker graffiti.

Eine first came to prominence in the "commercial" graffiti scene through his symbiotic partnership with the London graffiti artist Banksy; through Eine, Banksy was able to join the underground lifestyle and approach the business world from Banksy Eine.

Eine's shutter lettering on Hackney Road, London

He developed a variety of lettering styles to use for commercial work, including Shutter, NewCircus, Neon, Elton, Vandal~~ism,~~ Tenderloin and Wendy.

In 2007, residents of Tower Hamlets were surveyed via the Tower Hamlets Partnership Brick Lane to ask whether they believed his graffiti was disrespectful and whether removal is appropriate. As a result, graffiti was deemed an act of vandalism according to the council. Since then, the council has modified its graffiti laws with the objective of maintaining popular, non-offensive street art simply because it attracts tourists. (This reference is no longer valid).

Ben Eine painted the entire alphabet onto Middlesex Street in East London in May 2010. His selection of colors and text on both shutters and murals can be observed in London's Shoreditch, Brick Lane and Broadway Market areas. The residents renamed Middlesex Street as Alphabet Street, and was defined by The Times as "a street now internationally recognized as a living piece of art with direct links to The White House".

In July 2010, President Barack Obama was presented with a painting by Eine, Twenty First Century City, as an official gift from the British prime minister, David Cameron. Eine had become so surprised that he later produced "The Strangest Week", an artwork featuring large letters constructed from "smileys" along Hackney Road.

In March of 2011, Eine's independent show at San Francisco's White Walls gallery sold out before it opened. Additionally, he attended MOCA's "Art in the Streets" show, regarded as the largest street art display yet, conducted in April of 2011 in Los Angeles.

Eine's creations were displayed at Art Below's The Peace Project. His graffiti typography was showcased there. One of his designs that simply used the word love titled "Circus Love" was displayed at Regent's Park. This was previously displayed on a wall of Art Below's July 2012 show at Oxford Circus tube station on the Central Line. Eine joined an increasing group of street artists who have exhibited with Art Below such as Banksy, Inkie, Mike Ballard and Goldie.

In 2012, the typographer Chank Diesel released Tenderloin, a free font developed in collaboration with Eine.

In 2013, Edition House and Gallery Nelly Duff released "Tenderloin A-Z", a 52-colour silkscreen based on the Tenderloin font.

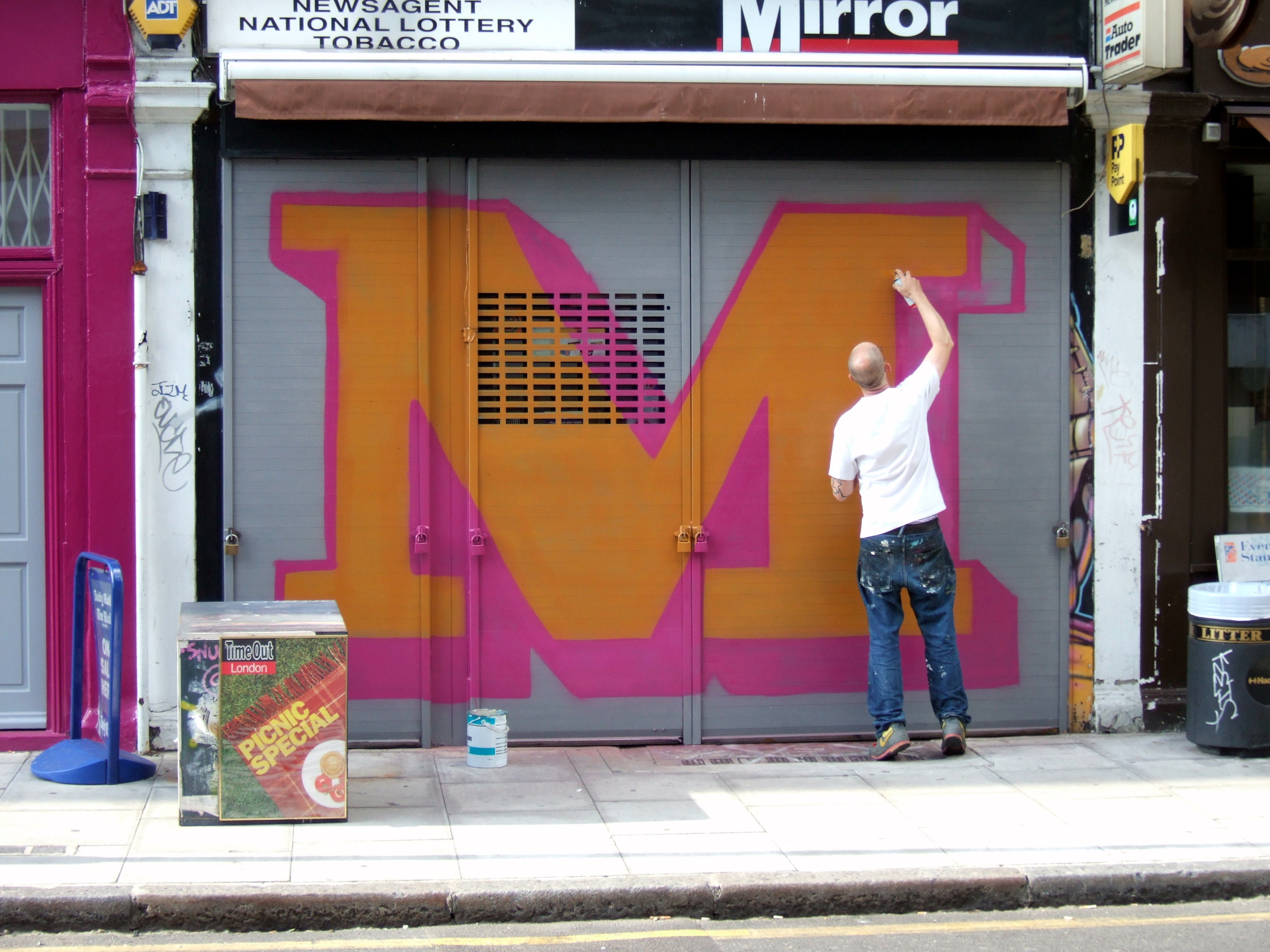
Eine painting an 'M' on a Diptesh Confectionery

In 2015, Eine created a mural spelling out the word "Diversity" at University High School in Irvine, CA.

In 2020, Ben Eine designed a pod for the London Eye's 20th anniversary

In January 2020, Central Saint Martins college named a class room after Ben Eine.

== Politics ==
Eine has publicly expressed his respect for David Cameron and has a Vote Conservative tattoo.. He subsequently added "Don't" to "Vote Conservative".

== Charitable work ==
Throughout Eine's career he has made numerous charitable contributions, including donations to Shelter and War Child via sales from Christie's auction house.

Eine worked with the Movember Foundation as well as Sotheby's Charity Auction to promote mental wellness recognition and support, who began to sell ten vivid new pieces produced by renowned street artists globally. Spearheaded by the artist D*Face, the initiative included original pieces from Felipe Pantone, Shepard Fairey, Jonathan Yeo, Invader, Okuda, Alexis Diaz, Conor Harrington and Vhils. Collectively, "each artist created an agenda-setting piece motivated by, and aimed at nurturing, open conversations surrounding men's mental health and suicide prevention".

Eine has used graffiti designs to promote an end of knife crime and violence, including "Peace Is Possible" and "Stop Knife Crime"."Street artist Ben Eine unveils striking giant mural in tribute to victims of knife crime". Creative Boom. 20 November 2018.
- November 2018

In addition, he has produced artwork that promote human rights, including his "Brave" piece, and has chosen to participate in exhibitions, like MACAM's Wall of Contemplation, which commemorated the 70th anniversary of the Universal Declaration of Human Rights.

Eine has promoted the development and empowerment of younger individuals, by involvement in programs such as Youth Unity Day, to encourage optimism and deter youth from violence.

In 2011, Eine was invited by Amnesty International to produce the poster celebrating its 50th anniversary, joining other artists such as Picasso and Joan Miró in supporting the charity through art.

== Other endeavours ==
In January 2018, Eine launched the first collection for his clothing company EINE London, at London Fashion Week: Men's.

In August 2019, Eine launched his creative studio OurTypes. In honor of the debut of OurTypes, he painted each letter of the alphabet on shutters in East London. OurTypes is a multidisciplinary creative studio concentrated on words. It collaborates with other artists on font releases and global brands on commercial projects. In August 2019, OurTypes launched Eine's most notorious typeface, New Circus font, for personal use.

== Eine in popular culture ==
In January 2008, Eine was featured in an article in London's Time Out magazine as one of the six best new street artists working in the capital.

There is a chapter on Eine in Street Renegades: New Underground Art by Francesca Gavin and he is also featured in The Art Of Rebellion 2: World Of Urban Art Activism by Christian Hundertmark, and he was featured in Sebastian Peiter's documentary Guerilla Art.

Eine's lettering is often used in magazines and promotional material. His work was used prominently by the pop group Alphabeat and in Duffy's music video for "Stepping Stone" and also, briefly, in Snow Patrol's video for "Take Back the City".

== Exhibitions ==
=== Solo shows ===
2018: "Everything Starts Somewhere", Bruton Art Factory, Bruton (UK)

2018: "Everything Starts Somewhere", Stolen Space Gallery, London (UK)

2017: "Home Sweet Homeless", Jealous Gallery, London (UK)

2017: "STREET ART", Heather James Fine Art, Palm Desert (USA)

2015: "Your Not My Type", StolenSpace Gallery, London (UK)

2014: "HEARTFELT", Judith Charles Gallery, New York (USA)

2013: "INNOCENCE", Corey Helford Gallery, Los Angeles (USA)

2013: "OUCH", Project One Gallery, San Francisco (USA]

2012: "COLOR OR COLOUR", Charles Bank Gallery, New York (USA)

2011: "Love/Hate", Megumi Ogita Gallery, Tokyo (Japan)

2011: "GREATEST", White Walls, San Francisco (USA)

2009: "EINE World Record Attempt Show", Nelly Duff, London (UK)

2009: "The A-Z of Change", Carmichael Gallery, Los Angeles (USA)

2008: "When The Lights Go Out" – Andenken Gallery, Denver, (USA)

2007: Vandalism – Kemistry Gallery, London, (UK)

2007: Portobello Film Festival – Westbourne Studios, London, (UK)

=== Group shows ===
2022: "Ben Eine and Friends", Kolly Gallery, Zurich

2019: "Wall Of Contemplation", MACAM, Byblos (Lebanon)

2019: "20 Years Smiling With Friends", Stolen Space Gallery, London (UK)

2019: "Random Acts of Kindness", Semi Skimmed Gallery, London (UK)

2019: "XYZ", GoGallery, Amsterdam (Netherlands)

2019: "Lucky 13 Anniversary Show Pt. 1: Fine Art of Street & Graffiti", Corey Helford Gallery, Los Angeles (USA)

2018: "ALL CAPS", LCD Gallery, Houston [USA]

2018: "Crossover", Galerie Kronsbein, Munich (Germany)

2018: "For All Mankind", Attollo Art, London (UK)

2018: "Emerging to Established", Krause Gallery, New York (USA)

2018: "Transcript", Charlie Smith London, London (UK)

2018: "Opening", Urban Nation Museum, Berlin (Germany)

2017: "In Memoriam Francesca Lowe", Charlie Smith London, London (UK)

2016: "Urban Art Preview", Galerie Kronsbein, Munich (Germany)

2016: "Uplift", Black Book Gallery, Englewood (USA)

2015: "MUCA COLLECTION", MUCA, Munich (Germany)

2014: "Spectrum", StolenSpace Gallery, London (UK)

2014: "Amazing Summer", MUCA, Munich (Germany)

2014: "M/5", Urban Nation Museum, Berlin (Germany)

2013: "The Wooster Collective 10th Anniversary Show", Jonathan LeVine Gallery, Jersey City (USA)

2012: "Winter Group Show", White Walls Gallery, San Francisco (USA)

2012: "Love & Hate", Stolen Space Gallery, London (UK)

2012: "Street Art: from the Victoria and Albert Museum, London and Libya", Dar Al Fagi Hassan Art Gallery, Tripoli (Libya)

2011: "Unfair: Part 1", Whisper Gallery, London (UK)

2011: "MTV: RE:DEFINE", Goss-Michael Foundation, Dallas (USA)

2011: "Art in the Streets", Museum of Contemporary Art (MOCA), Los Angeles (USA)

2011: "Gossip Well Told", Moniker, London (UK)

2011: "Zero-Sixty" Corey Helford Gallery, Los Angeles (USA)

2011: "Street Art – Meanwhile in deepest East Anglia, thunderbirds were go", Von Der Heydt Museum, Wuppertal (Germany)

2011: "The Beer Mat Show", Cedar Lewisohn, London (UK)

2010: "Faces", Electric Blue Gallery, London (UK)

2009: "Corked", Cork Street Gallery, London (UK)

2008: "4 Geezers", Ad Hoc Art, New York (The London Police, Flying Fortress, Pez and Eine) (USA)

2008: "Urban Art" Weserburg Museum of Modern Art, Bremen (Germany)

2008: "Make Over", Stella Dore Gallery, London, (UK)

2008: "Cans Festival", Leake Street, London, (UK)

2008: "Stella Dore" Sebastian Guinness Gallery, Dublin (Ireland)

2007: "Santa's Ghetto", Bethlehem (West Bank)

2007: "For Life, Not Just For Christmas" Open Studio Spaces, London (UK)

2007: "Urban Sprawl", Leonard Street Gallery, London (UK)

2007: "Eleven", Leonard Street Gallery, London (UK)

2006: "Santa's Ghetto", Oxford Street, London (UK)

2006: "UK Jack OK", Colette, Paris (France)

2005: "Santa's Ghetto", Oxford Street, London (UK)

2005: "POW Group Show", Allmänna Galleriet, Stockholm (Sweden)

2004: "Santa's Ghetto", Oxford Street, London (UK)

2003: "Banksy vs Eine", Gallery V1, Copenhagen (Denmark)

2002: "We Like Printing", Alife, New York (USA)

2002: "We Like Printing", Artomatic, London (UK)

=== Art fairs and festivals ===
2019: Youth Unity Day, London (UK)

2019: Art Car Boot Fair, London (UK)

2019: Nuart, Aberdeen (UK)

2019: SCOPE New York, Corey Helford Gallery, New York (USA)

2018: Manchester Art Fair, Leon Martyn, Manchester (UK)

2018: Beyond The Streets, Los Angeles (USA)

2018: Mural Festival, Montreal (Canada)

2018: CONTEXT Art Miami, Black Book Gallery, Miami (USA)

2018: Moniker Art Fair, Landmark Street Art, London (UK)

2018: Punch the girlfriend performance piece in which he attacked his girlfriend.

2018: Moniker International Art Fair Brooklyn, Spoke Art, New York (USA)

2017: CONTEXT Art Miami, Black Book Gallery, Miami (USA)

2017: Art Miami, Vroom & Varossieau, Miami (USA)

2017: London Art Fair, Jealous Gallery, London (UK)

2016: CONTEXT Art Miami, Black Book Gallery, Miami (USA)

2016: London Original Print Fair, Jealous Gallery, London (UK)

2014: ARTMUC, MUCA, Munich (Germany)

2012: SCOPE New York, Corey Helford Gallery, New York (USA)

2011: SCOPE Miami, White Walls, Miami (USA)

2011: Outpost, Paste Modernism 3, Sydney (Australia)

2007: Portobello Film Festival, Westbourne Studios, London (UK)

2007: Nuart, Stavanger (Norway)

=== Talks and juries ===
2019: "Contemporary Art by Ben Eine", Pixel Show, Sao Paulo (Brazil)

2019: "The Written Word", The British Library, London (UK)

2019: "Inspiring City" Art Republic, Brighton (uk)

2018: "Saving Banksy", Talk & Documentary Review at Soho house, Amsterdam (Netherlands)

2018: "From Vandalism to Fine Art" TEDx Talk, University of East Anglia, Norwich (UK)

=== Films and documentaries ===
2019: "Rom Boys", documentary

2018: "X Art", documentary

2017: "Saving Banksy", documentary

2012: "Art Battle L.A." documentary

2011: "Graffiti Wars", documentary

2011: "Outside In: The Story of Art in the Streets", documentary

2020: "Banksy and the Rise of Outlaw Art", documentary

=== Radio appearances and podcasts ===
2019: Killa Kela

2019: Mizog Art

2019: Art Republic

2019: Radio National Australia

2018: Bench Talk 91

2018: BBC Radio

2018: TikiChrisTalks

2015: Berlin Community Radio

2014: Vantage Point Radio

2011: Mike Maxwell
