= Nasser Azam =

British artist (born 1963)

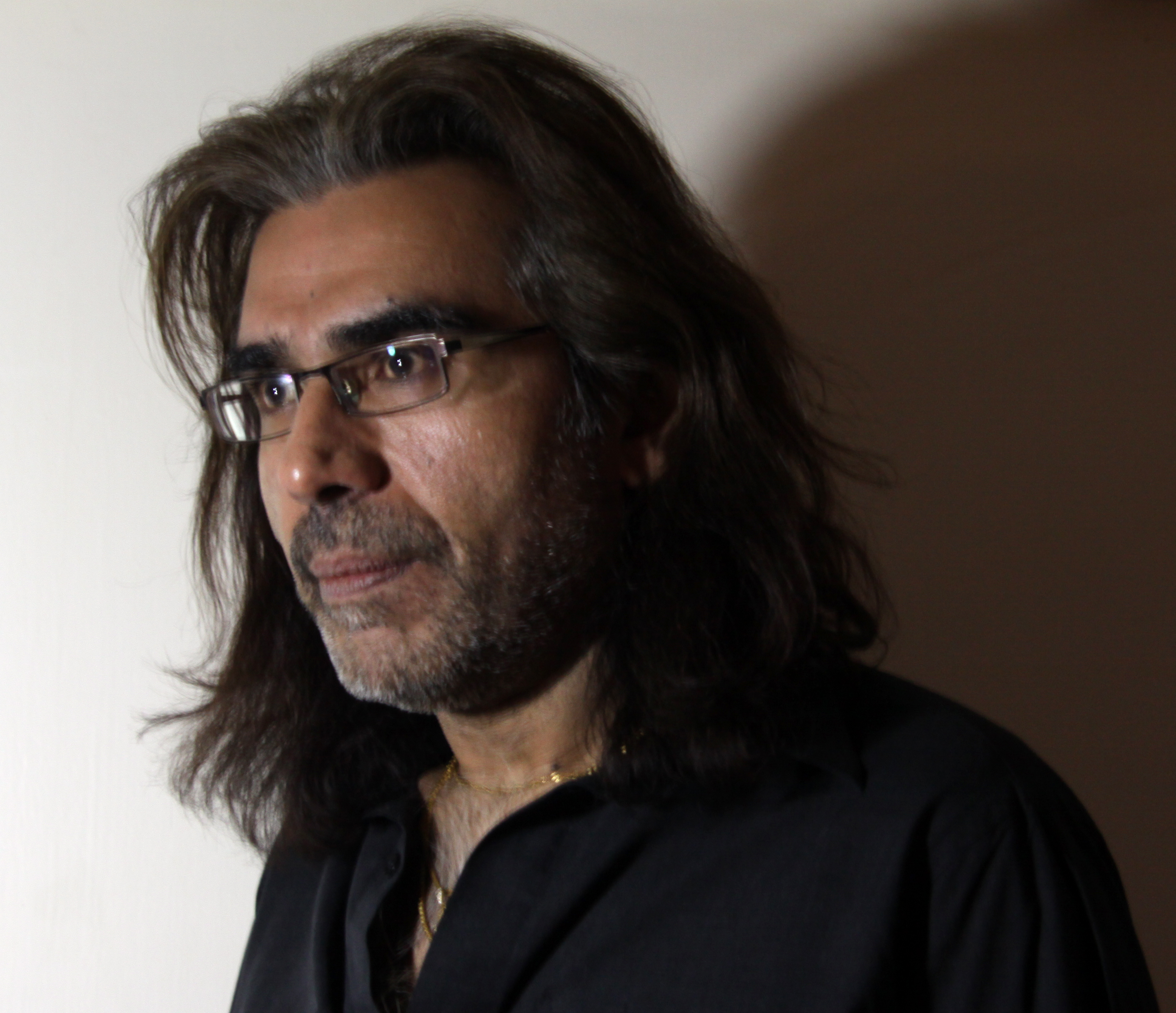
- Nasser Azam c. 2012
- Born: 15 September 1963 (age 63); Jhelum, Pakistan
- Known for: Painting, Sculpture
- Notable work: Athena (2012); The Contrast (1982); The Newborn (1981); Zero Gravity and Antarctica series (2008–2010); Official Portrait of Malala Yousafzai (2015); Evolutionary Loop 517 (2013); Saiful Malook (2019)
- Website: azam.com

Nasser Azam (born 1963 in Jhelum, Pakistan) is an international, British-based contemporary artist recognised for his monumental public sculptures, commissioned portraits, and collaborative projects in extreme environments. In 2015, he painted the official portrait of Nobel Peace Prize laureate Malala Yousafzai, commissioned by the University of Birmingham and unveiled at the Barber Institute of Fine Arts. Azam has conducted painting expeditions in Antarctica, in zero gravity with the Russian Space Agency, and in 2018 embarked on a collaboration with the musician Soumik Datta at Lake Saiful Muluk in the Himalayas. His paintings have often explored themes of diaspora identity since the early 1980s, and his work is held in various public and private collections internationally, including the permanent collections of the Ben Uri Gallery & Museum, London.

== Biography ==
Nasser Azam was born in Jhelum, Pakistan, in 1963 and moved to London with his family in 1970. He began painting seriously in 1980 while studying for a business degree at the University of Birmingham. By 1983 he had exhibited in the West Midlands, including a solo exhibition at the Barber Institute of Fine Arts. In the same year, he was the subject of a BBC documentary examining his parallel careers in art and finance.

Early works from this period, including The Newborn (1981) and The Contrast (1982), explored themes of family and cultural identity. Both paintings were later acquired for the permanent collection of the Ben Uri Gallery and Museum. Following periods living and travelling in Japan, the United States and Europe, Azam returned to London in 2006 to focus on his artistic practice.

In 2010 Azam purchased the Morris Singer Art Foundry and relaunched it as the Zahra Modern Art Foundry.

== Selected works ==
- The Newborn (1981) and The Contrast (1982): Seminal paintings exploring themes of family and migration; both works are held in the permanent collection of the Ben Uri Gallery and Museum, London.
- The Dance (2008): A 4-metre bronze sculpture originally sited on the South Bank, London, and relocated in 2010 to the Park Plaza Westminster Bridge.
- Performance Painting series (2008–2010): A body of large-scale canvases created in extreme environments, including zero-gravity conditions and Antarctica.
  - Zero Gravity works were produced aboard a parabolic flight simulating weightlessness.
  - Antarctica works were created during an expedition responding to the continent's extreme landscape conditions.
- Athena (2012): A 12-metre bronze sculpture installed near London City Airport; at the time of its unveiling it was described as the tallest public bronze sculpture in the United Kingdom.
- Evolutionary Loop 517 (2013): A 6.25-metre bronze sculpture commissioned for the University of Aberdeen and sited outside the Sir Duncan Rice Library.
- Official Portrait of Malala Yousafzai (2015): Commissioned for the Barber Institute of Fine Arts and the University of Birmingham.
- Saiful Malook (2019): A body of paintings inspired by a pilgrimage to Pakistan; the subject of a major solo exhibition at the Saatchi Gallery, London. The journey to Lake Saiful Malook and the creative process were documented in the film Saiful Malook (2018).

== 'Performance Painting' Project 2008–2010 ==
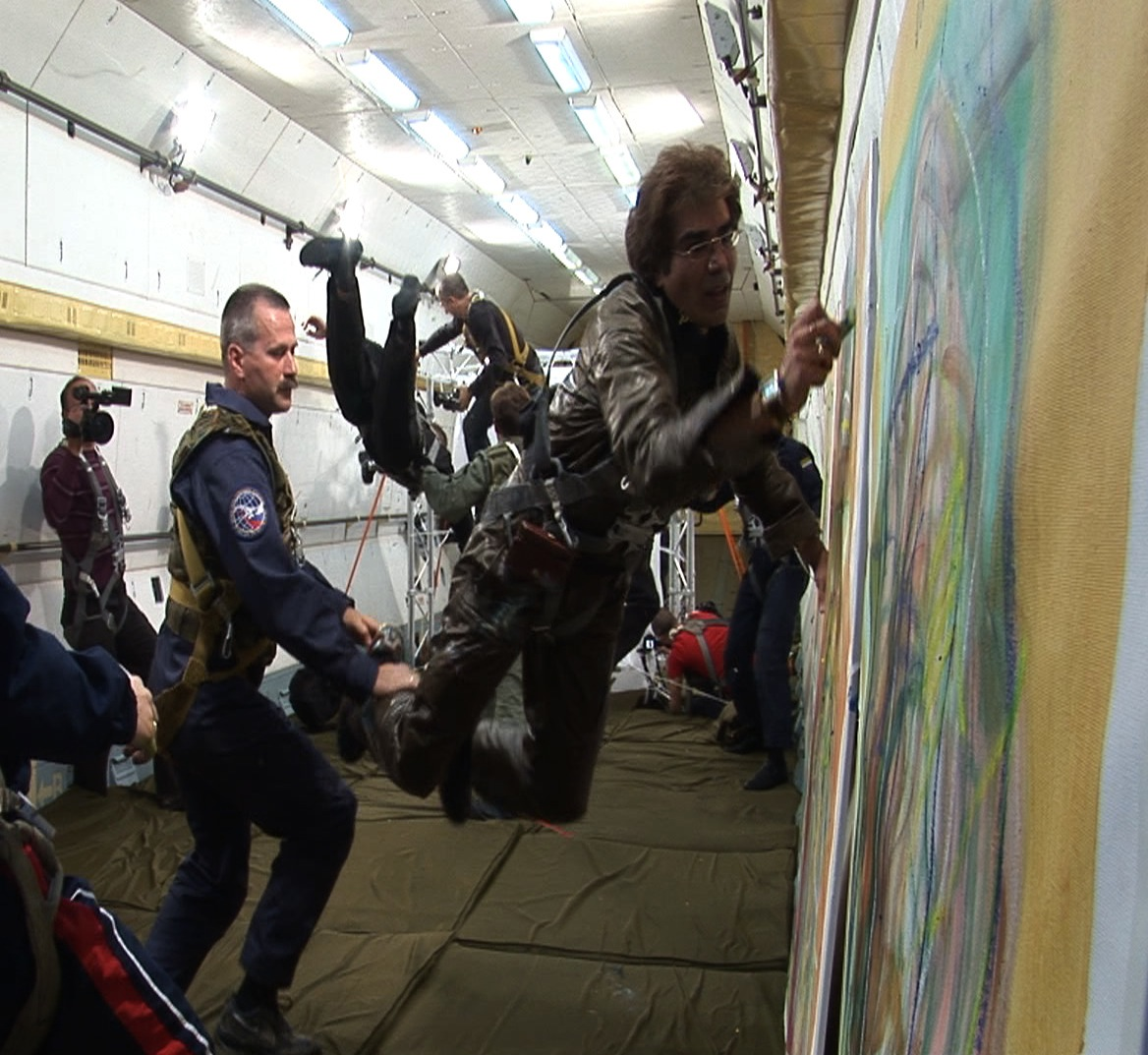
Nasser Azam painting in zero gravity (2008). He completed two works during the project at the Russian Space Agency, Moscow.

Many of Azam's works during the period 2008 to 2010 were made as part of the 'performance painting' project. His purpose was to find the most extreme conditions in which to make paintings, and to use a work of art to document the moment and location in which it was made. In July 2008 Azam completed a project he called Life in Space aboard a specially modified ILYUSHIN 76 MDK parabolic aircraft, where he completed two triptychs, Homage to Francis Bacon: Triptych I and Homage to Francis Bacon: Triptych II while the aircraft created weightless conditions similar to those in space. Azam's 'Life in Space' series of paintings was exhibited in London in Spring 2009.

In February 2010 Azam conducted an artistic expedition to Antarctica, where he produced 13 large abstract oil paintings responding to different Antarctic landscapes, including ice lakes, ice caves, glaciers and ice deserts. Azam prepared for the Antarctica trip with a series of artistic trials in the freezers at Billingsgate Fish Market. The expedition was accompanied by a cameraman to document the mission.

== Art Below ==
In April 2011, Azam, with Art Below, carried out a dual public art display in the Tokyo Metro and London Underground commuters saw a scene of Antarctica and one artist – a dot in the huge icy canvas. In July 2008 Azam completed two triptychs in zero gravity, done as a homage to the artist Francis Bacon. In February 2010, accompanied by a camera crew, Azam to draw inspiration from the frozen tundra of Antarctica where he endured extreme weather conditions to produce a series of large abstract oil paintings. For 2 weeks, Azam's work was on the billboard space of 2 platforms 6000 miles apart in Tokyo's Shibuya station and London's Liverpool Street Station with images of his Antarctica series. Azam commented "I wanted to expose the desolate, silent, spacious and empty environment of the South Pole in probably the most crowded, hectic, busy and noisy space in the world" Accompanying the poster display on the Liverpool Street station platform, Art Below took over a 3-metre wide digital projection screen, piloting an international video link enabling London's travellers to view the Tokyo platform – the poster display and all the public activity going on around it. Playing on the same video loop was a 2-minute film made in collaboration with Bafta nominated British Film Director Ed Blum. Here we see Nasser Azam creating canvasses at temperatures of minus 40 degrees and buffeted by gales, he paints in different settings: on glaciers, by frozen lakes, in ice caves. Nasser says "I am confronted by a magnitude of blinding light, by wind and intense cold." Some of his canvases were lost in an Antarctic gale. But most are here for us to see. Such ordeals need preparation. Azam prepared for this venture in the huge freezer of Billingsgate Butchers Market, devising brushes that would work in such temperatures, and acrylic paint that did not clog. Art Below made the policy decision to persist with this display in Tokyo despite tsunami, earthquake and nuclear fallout. Ben Moore said, "We did this in the sure conviction that Tokyo's commuters will appreciate such a diversion from their adversities. Now is not the time to withdraw our custom." This was the third exhibition they have staged in the Tokyo metro.

== Official Portrait of Malala Yousafzai ==
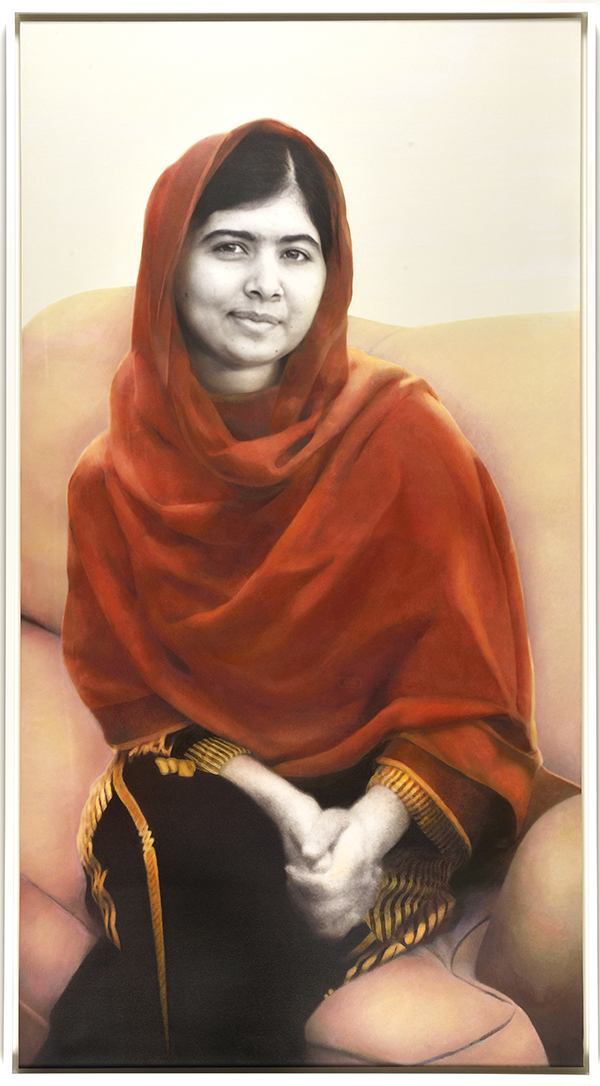
Official Portrait of Malala Yousafzai (2015). Commissioned by the University of Birmingham; unveiled at the Barber Institute of Fine Arts.

In 2015, Nasser Azam painted the official portrait of Malala Yousafzai, an activist for female education and the youngest-ever Nobel Prize laureate. Standing three metres high, the portrait indicates the enormous impact Yousafzai has had on the world. Malala first attracted public attention through her anonymous diary published on BBC website, detailing life under Taliban occupation in Pakistan, and their attempts to ban education for girls. In 2012, Malala narrowly avoided death after being shot by the Pakistani Taliban militants for her outspoken campaigning. After numerous interventions and intensive rehabilitation at the Queen Elizabeth Hospital in Birmingham, United Kingdom Malala has made a full recovery and continued her mission for the right of all children to education. The assassination attempt sparked a worldwide outburst, and Yousafzai's advocacy has since grown into an international movement. After seeing Azam's monumental portrait for the first time, Malala stated: It's more than a painting to me, it's the support that Mr Azam gives to the education campaign that I stand for and that's why it means a lot to me. I am hopeful that we will achieve our goal, we will make sure every child goes to school. The painting was donated to the University of Birmingham, digitally displayed at the new state-of-the-art library in Birmingham's city centre and added to London's National Portrait Gallery's public archive.

== Saiful Malook (2018–2019) ==
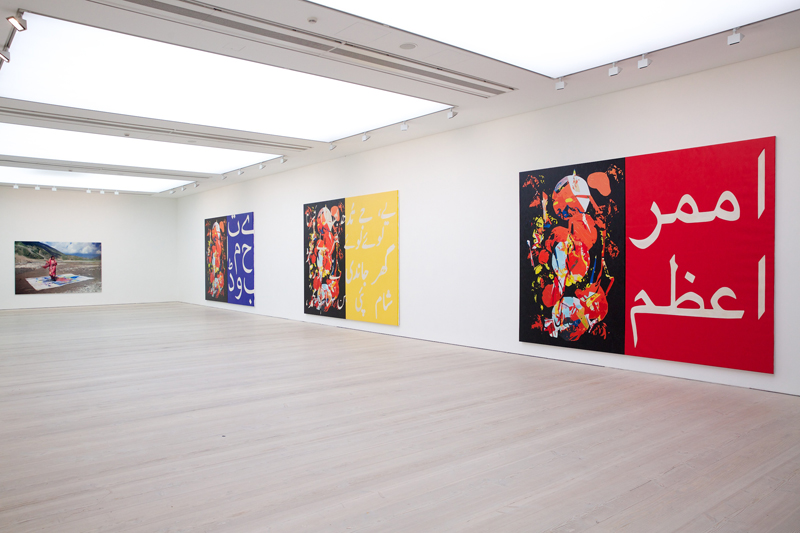
Installation view of Azam's solo exhibition at the Saatchi Gallery, London (2019), featuring works from the Saiful Malook series.

In August 2018, Azam embarked on a painting expedition to Lake Saiful Muluk in the Himalayan mountains of Pakistan. Inspired by the 19th-century Sufi poem by Mian Muhammad Bakhsh—a fable concerning a Persian prince's search for a fairy princess—the project explored themes of spiritual pilgrimage and diaspora identity. Azam produced a series of large-scale paintings in situ at an altitude of over 10,000 feet, collaborating with British-Indian composer Soumik Datta, who composed music on-site in response to the landscape. The resulting body of work was premiered in a comprehensive solo exhibition at the Saatchi Gallery in London in May 2019.

== Sited sculptures ==
- The Dance (2008): Originally unveiled on the South Bank, London, the sculpture was later relocated in 2010 to the public square outside the Park Plaza Westminster Bridge.
- Sepian Blue: Exhibited at Sculpture in Context, held at the National Botanic Gardens, Dublin, and later retained in the gardens' collection.

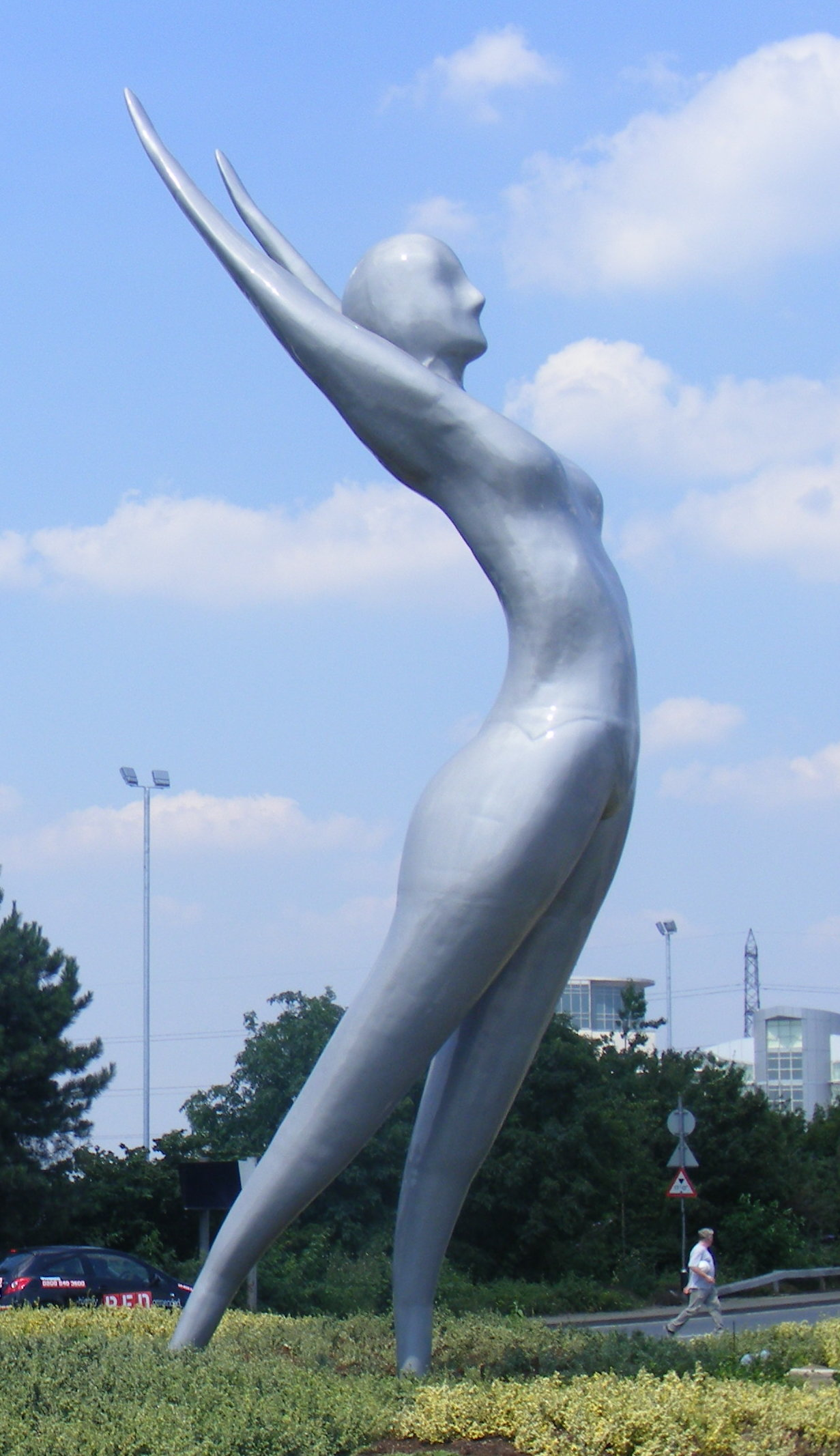
Athena (2012), London City Airport; at 12 metres (39ft), it is the tallest bronze sculpture in the United Kingdom.

- Athena (2012): Unveiled on 5 July 2012 on Connaught Bridge Road, Silvertown, near London City Airport, the 12-metre bronze sculpture was described at the time of its unveiling as the tallest public bronze sculpture in the United Kingdom.
- Evolutionary Loop 517 (2013): A 6.25-metre bronze sculpture commissioned for the University of Aberdeen and installed alongside the Sir Duncan Rice Library. The title was selected following a public competition.

Azam's monumental bronze works, including Athena and The Dance, were cast at Zahra Modern Art Foundries (formerly the Morris Singer Art Foundry), which Azam acquired in 2010 to preserve its historic heritage of casting major British landmarks.

== Projects ==
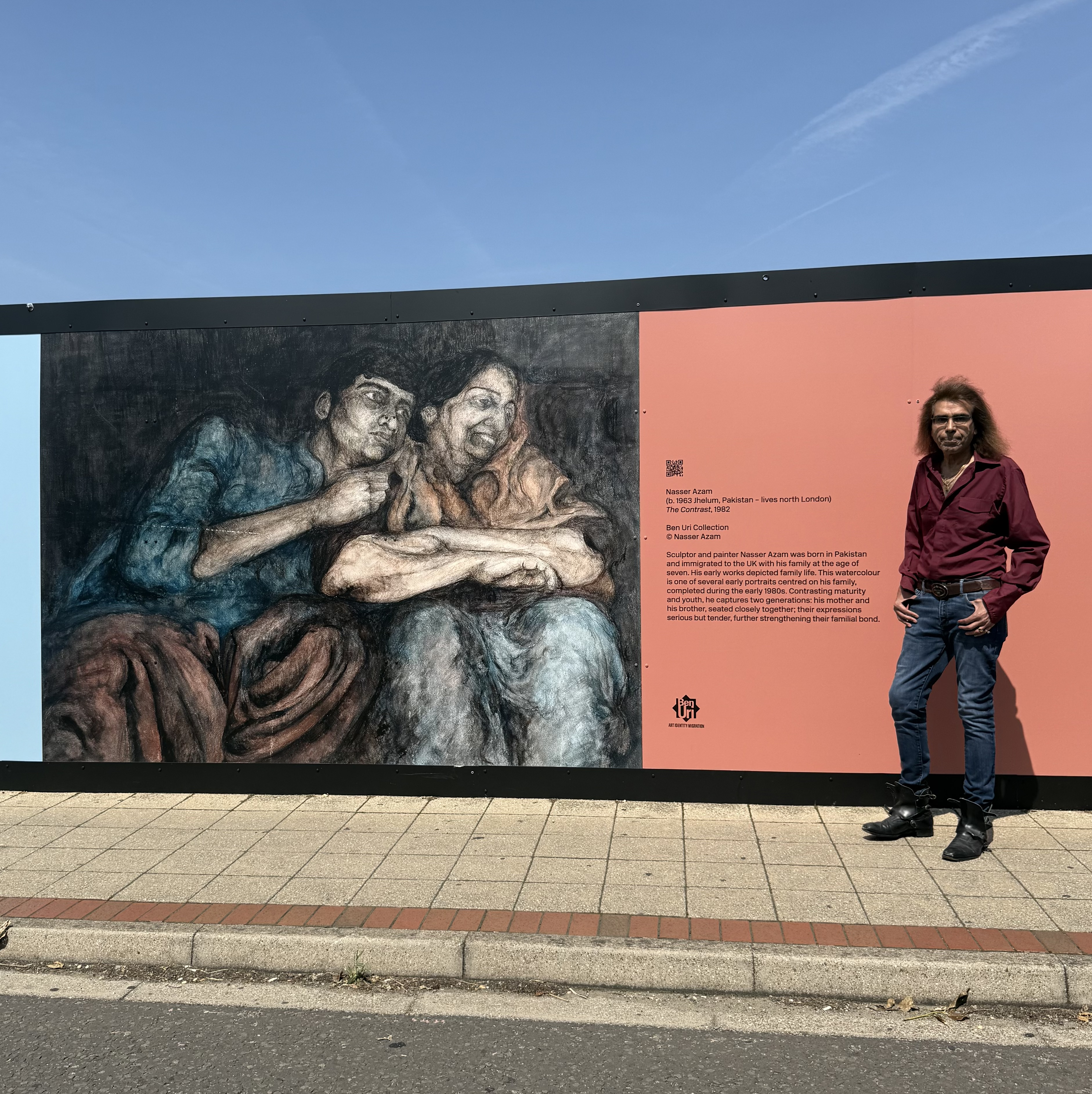
Nasser Azam standing next to a monumental display of The Contrast (1982) at the O2 Centre, London, as part of the Diaspora Project (2025).

- Between 2007 and 2009 Azam was Artist-in-Residence at County Hall Gallery, London having a number of major solo exhibitions including:
  - 2009 Colour Over Form, The County Hall Gallery, London, UK
  - 2009 Life in Space, The County Hall Gallery, London, UK
  - 2008 Azam Painting and Sculpture, Istanbul, Turkey
  - 2008 Paintings and Bronzes, County Hall Gallery, London, UK
  - 2008 Anatomica, The County Hall Gallery, London, UK
  - 2007 Azam Retrospective, The County Hall Gallery, London, UK
- 2008 Zero Gravity, a performance painting mission to complete two triptychs while aboard a parabolic aircraft creating weightless conditions, Star City, Moscow, Russia
- 2008 Zero Gravity, a performance painting mission to complete two triptychs while aboard a parabolic aircraft creating weightless conditions, Star City, Moscow, Russia
- 2010 Antarctica, a performance painting expedition to produce oil paintings responding to different Antarctic landscape
- 2011 Antarctica, a dual public display of Antarctica project in the Tokyo Metro and London Underground, UK and Japan
- 2011 Zahra Modern Art Foundries, purchase of the former Morris Singer Foundry, the oldest bronze foundry in the UK
- 2013/14 Commissions for Marea and Costata restaurants, New York City, USA
- 2015 Official portrait of Malala Yousafzai, unveiled at the Barber Institute of Fine Arts, Birmingham and displayed at the University of Birmingham. Also added to London's National Portrait Gallery's public archive, UK
- 2019 Saiful Malook, solo exhibition at Satchi Gallery London.
- 2024 Shaping the Future: New Arrivals at the Ben Uri Collection, Ben Uri Gallery & Museum, London: An exhibition featuring recent acquisitions to the permanent collection, highlighting artists who contribute to the narrative of art, identity, and migration. The exhibition included Azam's foundational works The Contrast (1982) and The Newborn (1981), displayed alongside works by Marc Chagall, Jacob Epstein, and Ben Enwonwu.
- 2024–present The Diaspora Project: A conceptual initiative examining themes of migration and identity across urban contexts, developed over four decades of the artist's practice.
- 2025 Sophia (Sophia Loren Portrait): A portrait honouring Italian screen actor Sophia Loren, engaging with themes of cultural identity and legacy.
- 2025–2026 Always Changing. Always Welcoming, O2 Centre, London: An open-air exhibition curated by Sarah MacDougall for the Ben Uri Gallery and Museum, presenting works from the museum's permanent collection alongside recent works including Dog Days (2024).
- 2026 Antarctica Iterations XX(I.I.I.), Hyde Park Corner Underground Station, London: A large-scale public art installation presented as part of the Art Below Spring Show 2026, utilizing billboard media to display works from the Antarctica series (2010). The project continues themes of landscape, identity, and environment developed through the Diaspora Project.

== Public appearances ==
- In October 2009 Azam participated in the debate 'Art: what's it good for?' chaired by Michael Portillo and part of the LCACE Inside Out Festival.
- In September 2009 Azam participated in Liliane Lijn's contemporary art performance piece Power Game at the Institute of Contemporary Arts, London.

== Bibliography ==
- Stonard, John-paul (30 April 2008). Azam: A Short History of Sensation. Airside Publications. ISBN 978-0955712609.
- The Independent on Sunday, Arts Review, Close-Up Nasser Azam, 4 January 2009

== Gallery ==
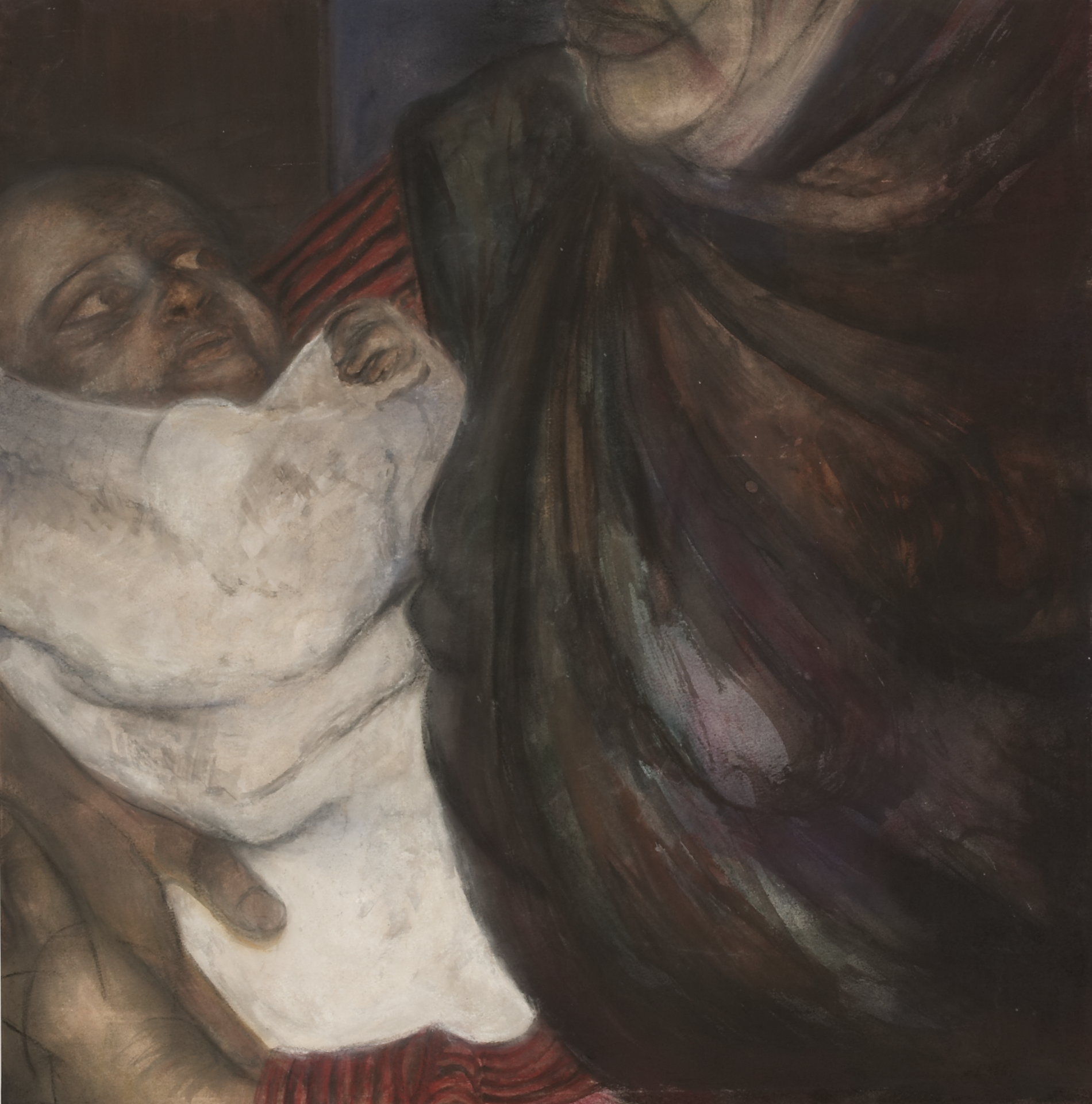
The Newborn (1981); permanent collection of the Ben Uri Gallery & Museum.

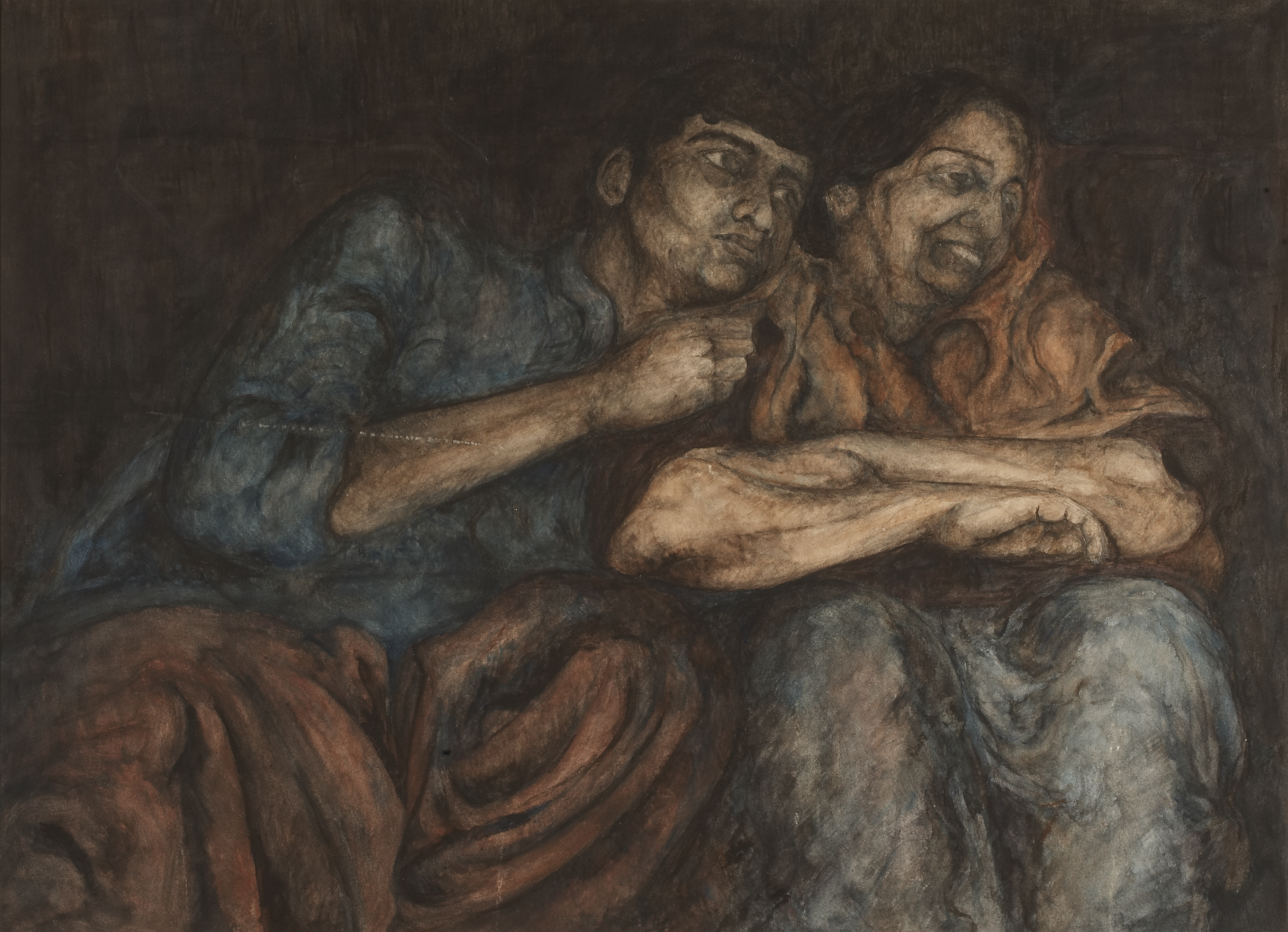
The Contrast (1982); permanent collection of the Ben Uri Gallery & Museum.

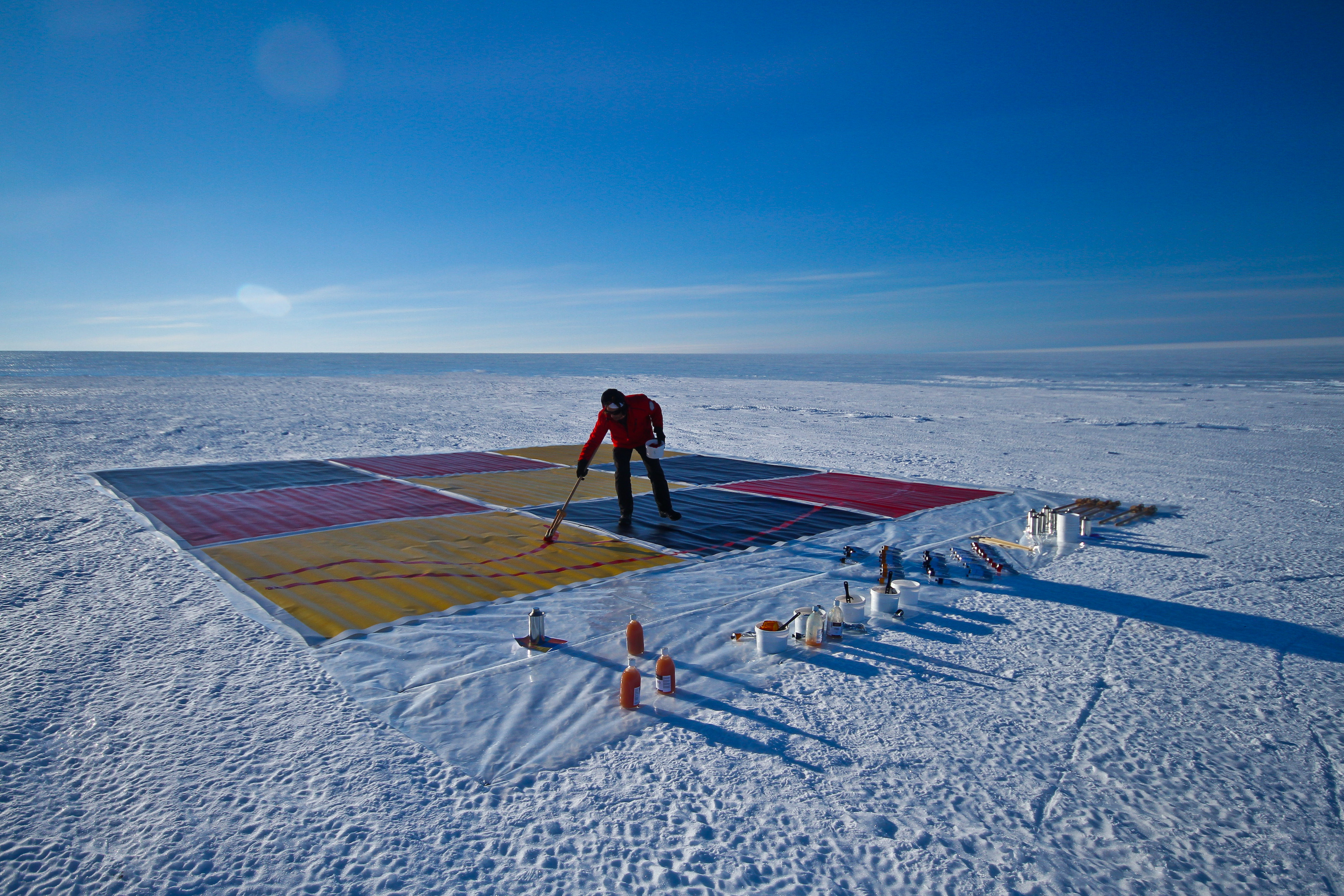
Antarctica series (2010). One of 13 monumental abstract oil paintings produced during the expedition to the South Pole.

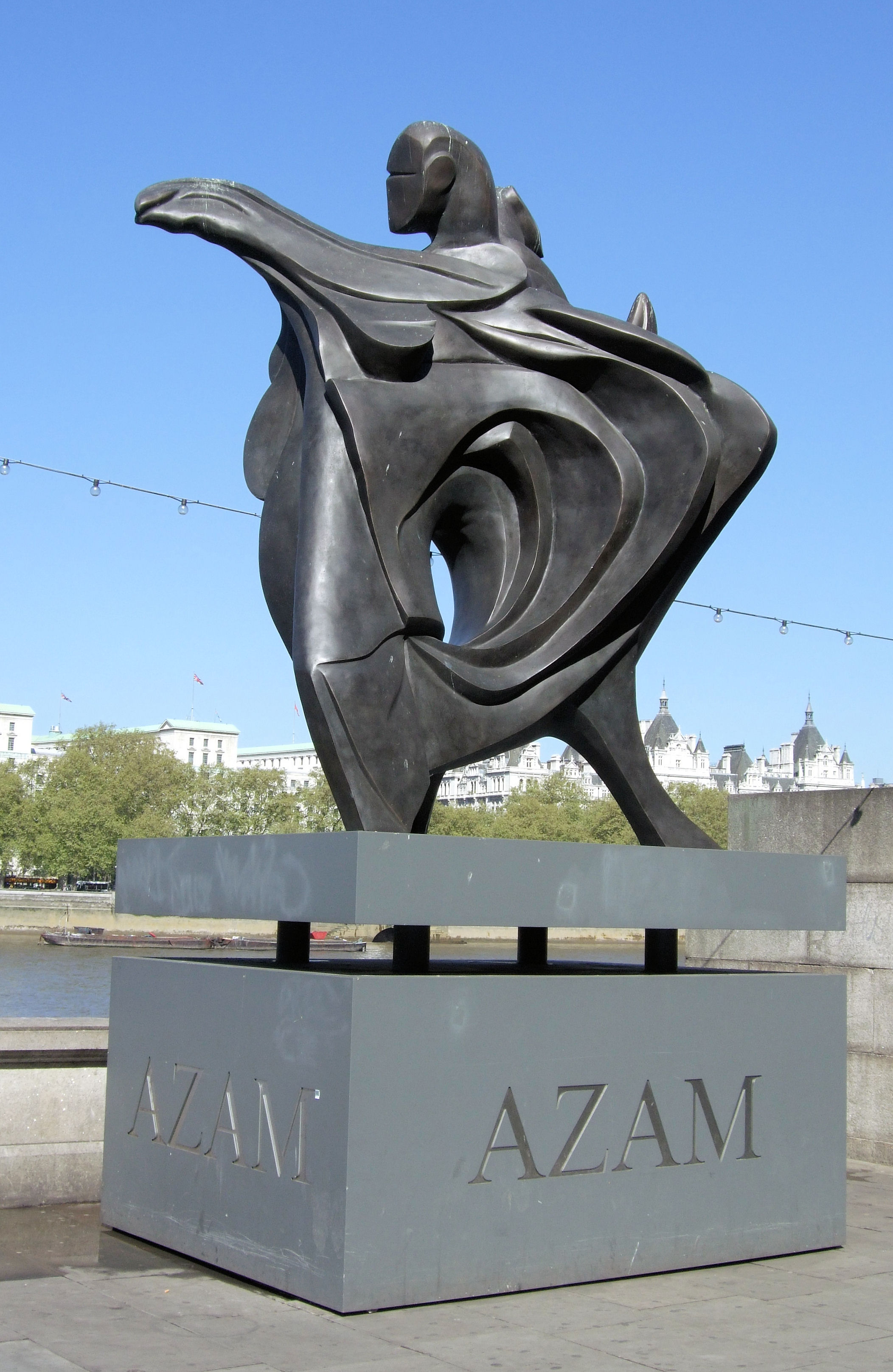
The Dance (2008). Bronze sculpture, originally sited on the South Bank, London (pictured); currently located at Park Plaza.

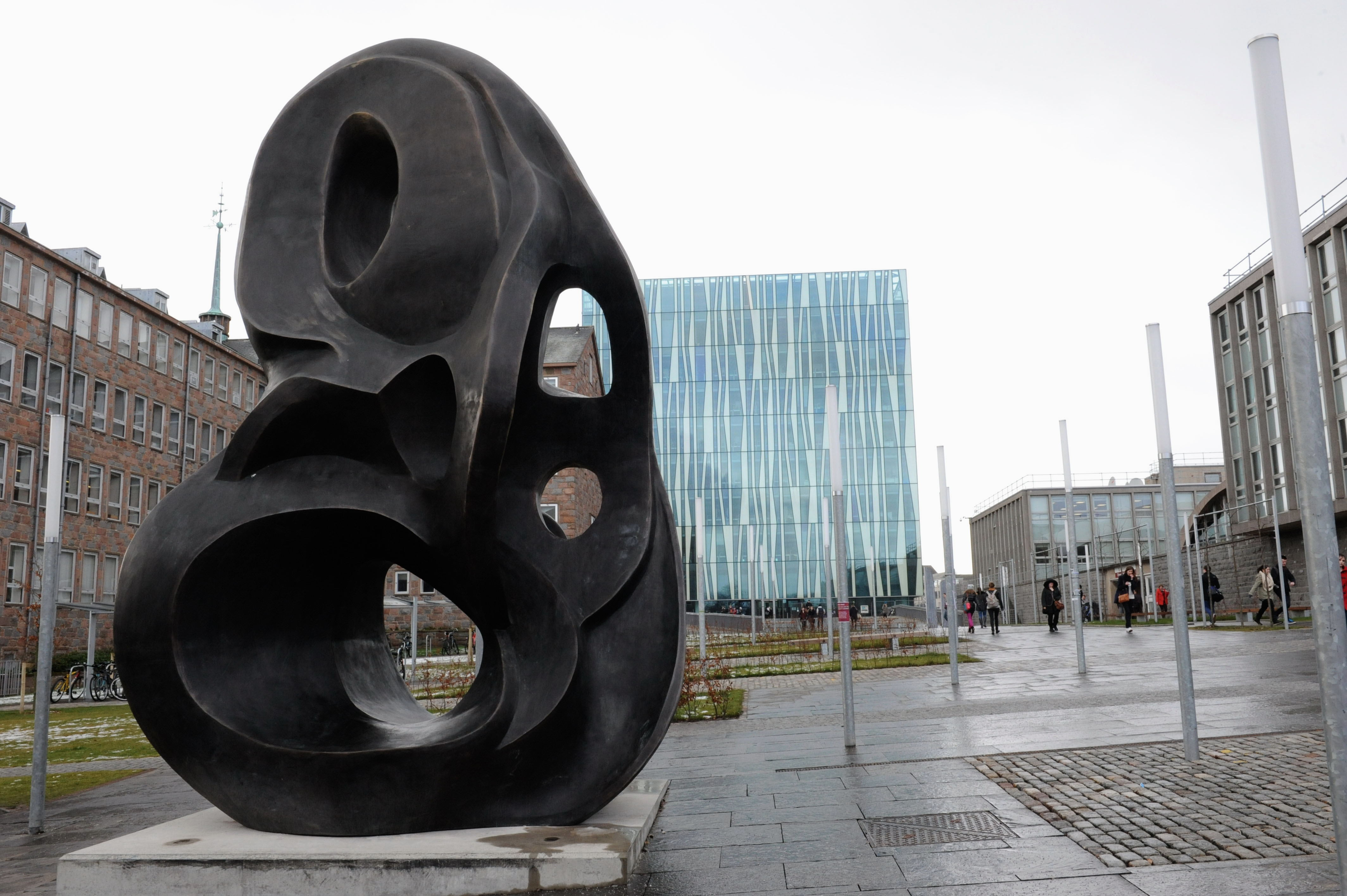
Evolutionary Loop 517 (2013), University of Aberdeen.
