= Topsy Turvy Tales =

Book by Charlotte Boulay-Goldsmith

- Author: Charlotte Boulay-Goldsmith
- Illustrator: Laura Hyde
- Language: English
- Publisher: Humpty Dumpty Publishing
- Publication place: United States
- Pages: 64 (Hardcover)
- ISBN: 0957156006

Topsy Turvy Tales is a 2012 illustrated storybook by Charlotte Boulay-Goldsmith and illustrated by Laura Hyde. The book was published by Humpty Dumpty Publishing on June 14, 2012. Topsy Turvy Tales is composed of four tales, Quest of the Head, The Girl With Liquid Eyes, Chester The Oyster and The Man With The Stolen Heart.

== Adaptations ==
The Girl With Liquid Eyes and The Man With The Stolen Heart have been adapted into short animations featuring the voices of actors Maryam d'Abo and Bill Nighy.

The Man With The Stolen Heart was nominated for "Best Animation" at the Charlotte Film Festival and won "Best Animation" at the UK Film Festival At the Cambridge Film Festival Jamie Brittain described the film as "divisive" but the "conceptual invention soon wins you over".

== Reception ==
Sylvia Whitman described the book on France 24 as "an exquisite and strange storybook". The literary magazine Neon called the series "an illustrated collection of gothic fairytales in verse." Laura Bailey in Vogue.com called it an "escape into dark dreams and twisted fantasies" Philip Colbert described parts of the book as "a cross between Sleepy Hollow and the Adams Family. Dark, funny, macabre and disturbing."
