= Charlotte Colbert =

Franco-British film director and artist

- Born: 1987 (age 38–39); New York, US
- Education: London Film School
- Known for: Feature films and Multimedia Art Installations
- Spouse: Philip Colbert
- Children: 2
- Parent: James Goldsmith (father)
- Relatives: Jemima Khan (half-sister)

Charlotte Colbert (born 1987) is a British film director and multi-media artist described by the Evening Standard as "a natural born magician." Her practice ranges from artistic installations which incorporate sculpture, photography and performative elements, to narrative feature-length films. Her directorial debut was praised by the New York Times and won the Golden Leopard for Best First Picture.

Colbert’s work explores themes such as identity, dreams, personal narratives, and the unconscious, often incorporating surreal and fantastical elements. The Design Museum describes her as someone who "conjures fantastical worlds by blending the boundaries between reality and imagination."

== Early life ==
Born in New York state, Colbert is the seventh of eight children of businessman Sir James Goldsmith, who died in 1997. Her mother is French journalist Laure Boulay de la Meurthe, with whom Goldsmith openly had a long-term relationship while married to Annabel Goldsmith. Colbert is a half-sibling of Jemima Khan. She went to 12 different schools and lived with various relatives before graduating high school in France. She studied philosophy and liberal arts in Montreal and then went on to become European distributor for the moon-cup.

== Art ==
=== Photography ===
Colbert's work has been likened to the surreal work of Toomer, Breton, and Dalí, described as "surreal and delicate" and "a gateway into dreams" (Huffington Post), an "exploration into the human mind", and as "existing in that space dreams and nightmares" (Las Ultimas Notices).

Colbert had made short animations when she enrolled at the London Film School to do her MA in screenwriting. While there she was commissioned to write the feature film Leave to Remain and other scripts for people such as Oliver Dahan, Eric Cantona and Tony Grisoni. "Writing involved a lot of sitting down and I struggle to stay in one place so I took pictures about how crazy the process of writing was for me - it became a series called A Day At Home which was shown at Gazelli Art House."

The solo show was described by The Huffington Post as "a surreal meditation on domesticity and self-destruction".

Her series In and Out of Space was done in homage to Kubrick's 2001 Space Odyssey and shown at Somerset House. "As opposed to sending an astronaut into space I wanted to send the astronaut into our own past. I was interested in the juxtaposition between the astronaut, symbol of the future, symbol of Man's ambition and power to surpass, and this totally decayed building of faded grandeur."

Colbert started working on her series Ordinary Madness after seeing her friend's two-year-old press their fingers against a pane of glass where a butterfly had landed and try to zoom into the creature to make it bigger. She was completely baffled by the simplicity of this gesture, which collapsed the physical 3D world and the digital 4D world in an instant. Where did our bodies begin and end in a digital age? She created these emoji-like cyborgs of which Ilaria Puri Purini from Contemporary Arts Society wrote: "Colbert's hybrid figures – partly human partly digital – become ghosts from the future…. Her delicate images hovering between intimacy and distance; desire and repulsion; robotic carcasses and sexualized bodies; creating a dystopic vision of the future where the cyborg emoji – an exotic species – runs through deserted households, its needs crystallized in a state of perpetual surveillance."

Colbert has been exhibited internationally, including Basel, and Istanbul Art Fair, Philip's, Christies and Sothebys as well as Institutions and Museums.

=== Multi-media sculptures and Installations ===
Colbert, in partnership with Flatiron Nomad, NYCDOTArt and the Meatpacking District installed two of her 30 foot sculptures in Manhattan. They were described as "Radically intimate public art", "an installation that transforms steel into something almost metaphysical".

Colbert's multi-media video sculptures are made of layered TV screens encased in rusty metal. The Benefit Supervisor Sleeping is a 170 kg video installation, 21st-century reinterpretation of Lucian Freud's famous painting of Sue Tilley. It is described as inverting the male gaze and "re-frame Sue Tilley, the subject of Freud's Benefit Supervisor series, from objectified to objectifier". 'I like the idea of turning the tables, subverting the male gaze. Sue is now looking at us.' says Charlotte Colbert. In 2018 she collaborated with Lily Cole doing a 3-meter video sculpture of the activist and model breastfeeding her child in response to the stigmatisation of breastfeeding in public.

In 2017 she made a video sculpture of Lee Soon-Kyu, a 79-year-old South Korean woman who was abruptly separated from her husband when the Korean War started. She did not see him for 65 years until finally she was allowed a 3-day visit to North Korea during which her son, now in his sixties, was able to see his father for the first time. "Her sitting for a moving image portrait was an extremely moving experience for me." Her show Dreamland Siren curated by Simon de Pury and UTA Artist Spac exhibited at Fitzrovia Chapel during Frieze Art Fair. It showcased monumental sculptures. "Loosely inspired by Alice in Wonderland {...} the exhibition invites us to become aware of what we dream and visualise collectively". The artist collaborated with composer Isobel Waller-Bridge to devise a soundscape for the exhibition which was released on vinyl and also collaborated with spoken word poet Hollie McNish who wrote a poem called dreamland for the show. "Colbert conjures fantastical worlds by blending the boundaries between reality and imagination," wrote Rachel Hajek of the Design Museum.

=== Lewes FC collaboration ===
In 2024 Colbert was asked to support Lewes F.C.’s “See Us As We Are Campaign” and she designed the playing shirts for the female team. The community owned team are known for their radical stance on gender parity - remunerating their female and male players equally since 2017. Colbert collaborated with singer Kate Nash on a video and song to support the team.

== Film ==
Colbert studied screenwriting at the London Film School. She is the co-author of feature film Leave to Remain about underage asylum seekers in Britain with a score by Mercury Prize-winning band Alt-J. It won awards at the BUFF Film Festival and the Bergamo Film Meeting.

In 2016, she wrote and directed The Silent Man, described in ID as "the most surreal shorts you'll ever see" with Simon Amstell, Sophie Kennedy-Clark, Ben Miller, and a cameo by Cillian Murphy. She wrote and directed two award winning animated shorts The Girl With Liquid Eyes with Maryam d'Abo and The Man With the Stolen Heart with Bill Nighy based on her book of short stories Topsy Turvy Tales.

She is a producer on Dali Land directed by Mary Harron (American Psycho), co-produced with Pressman Films. It is a biopic about artist Salvador Dalí starring Sir Ben Kingsley, Ezra Miller, Andreja Peijic, and Suki Waterhouse.

Colbert directed and co-wrote She Will with Alice Krige, Kota Eberhart, Malcolm McDowell, and Rupert Everett produced by Dario Argento and Ed Pressman Films with an original score by Clint Mansell. The film was nominated for a BIFA and won the Golden Leopard for the best first film at the Locarno Film Festival. It was Critic's Pick In the New York Times, and Mark Kermode described it as "an edgy psychological horror meets feminist fable". Jessica Kiang in Variety called it "A Superb, Sly Horror-Drama Debut Delivering Otherworldly Feminist Vengeance", Guillermo del Toro wrote it "a remarkable directorial debut, purely cinematic", and Alfonso Cuarón said "it sits in the tradition of great psychological horror films [which] leaves one questioning long after [it] is finished".

For the release Colbert collaborated with designer Ashley Williams and street artist Clayton on capsule collections supporting End Violence Against Women and Girls and worn by model and activist Lily Cole as well as Adhel Bol.

Colbert is the founder of Popcorn Group, a production company known for the short Leading Lady Parts (with Emilia Clarke, Florence Pugh and Gemma Chan), as well as for co-producing Fleabag in the WestEnd, and Alice Lowe's time travelling romcom TimeStalker with the BFI.

== Publishing ==
Colbert was one of the publishers of The Artists Colouring Book of ABCs done in support of the Kids Company, featuring works by Grayson Perry, Alex Katz, and Tracey Emin.

== Philanthropy ==
Colbert set up the Popcorn Writing Award in Edinburgh, and now runs it with the BBC Writersroom. The award champions brave and imaginative writing at the Edinburgh Festival Fringe every year.

Colbert also set up the NFTS x Popcorn Writing Award which allocates a prize to the most original script from NFTS film school screenwriting graduates.

Colbert is on the board of the Isla Foundation and the Ecology Trust.

== Personal life ==
Colbert has two children with artist Philip Colbert.
