= Inside Out Festival =

The Inside Out Festival is a festival curated by LCACE with the aim to showcase the contribution of nine London Universities to the capital's cultural life. Conceived in 2008, the festival of higher education and has taken place in a variety of venues across the city.

Notable events at the 2009 festival included a discussion at Kings Place chaired by Michael Portillo entitled 'Art: What's It Good For?', and an introduction by Andrew Motion (Poet Laureate 1999–2009) to his latest book of poems, The Cinder Path, amongst other works.

The seventh festival in 2017 focused on the intersections of technology with arts and culture.
