= Johan Andersson (artist) =

Swedish painter

- Born: 1986 (age 39–40); Trollhättan, Västergötland, Sweden
- Education: Central Saint Martins College of Art and Design (BA Honors Fine Art in 2008)
- Known for: painter
- Awards: BP Portrait Award (youngest ever artist to be shortlisted); Jerwood Foundation Contemporary Painters Prize
- Website: johanandersson.com

Johan Andersson (born 1986 in Trollhättan) is a Swedish painter.

== Career ==
=== Awards ===
Johan Andersson is co founder of Art Unified and lives and works in Los Angeles. He has exhibited in major museums such as Royal West of England, Saatchi gallery, V&A museum and National portrait gallery. In 2007 Andersson became the youngest ever artist to be shortlisted for the BP Portrait Award, winning third prize for his painting Tamara., which was viewed by over 195,000 people. The representational simplicity of his early work has been compared to recent works by Alex Katz.

Andersson is also a winner of the Jerwood Foundation Contemporary Painters Prize; his winning piece Kate has since sold on the secondary market for "in excess of £40,000" in a deal involving Eugene Tenenbaum. Following his early critical acclaim, Andersson has exhibited in six countries, at two major art fairs and in three museums including the Victoria and Albert Museum.

=== Painting of Amy Winehouse ===
In late July 2011 Andersson received a posthumous public commission to paint Amy Winehouse, which incorporated subtle use of spray paints. In July 2011 with Art Below he unveiled an image of the singer on the Northern line at Camden Town just two weeks after Winehouse's death. The image was re-exhibited in July 2012 in Art Below's build-up show to the Olympics. One year after Winehouse's death, Art Below reinstalled the image at Camden Town tube station, on Northern line Platform 1.

=== Collaborations ===
He has collaborated with the founder of Givey, David Erasmus, on a TED (conference) called The Power of Connection. His first formal series STOLEN FACES was revealed, exhibited and auctioned at Englefield House, Englefield, Berkshire in May 2012. He has since worked on two other series - paintings from Brand for Life were exhibited in both the Saatchi Gallery and the Royal West of England Academy; whilst Generation of War has led to Andersson collaborating for a short film, which was specially recognised by The Celeste Prize.

In 2026, Andersson painted Melania Trump and presented it to the White House at an event hosted by the National Endowment for the Humanities and Task Force 250 in the Indian Treaty Room of the Eisenhower Executive Office Building. He told the New York Times, "It felt like I was capturing her fearless beauty and the soul of America itself."
