= Souvid Datta =

British Indian photographer and filmmaker

Souvid Datta (born 1990) is a British Indian photographer and filmmaker.

== Biography ==
Datta was born in Mumbai in 1990, into a Bengali family. His father Soumilya is a banker and his mother Sangeeta a writer and art house film director. Datta grew up in India and London. He went to Harrow School on a scholarship and studied international relations, conflict studies and law at University College of London. As a photojournalist, Datta undertook projects across the world for a variety of clients, including National Geographic, TIME, The Guardian, The New York Times, BBC, etc. He has won numerous awards, including the PDN 30 in 2017, the Pulitzer Centre Grant in 2016, the Getty Grant for Editorial Photography in 2015, PDN Annual in 2015, and Magnum Photos 30 Under 30 Award in 2015. He was also a runner up in Sky Arts' reality TV show Masters of Photography and directed a documentary on the folk music of India (Tuning 2 You: Lost Musicians of India), which was hosted by his brother Soumik Datta, an accomplished sarod player, and in 2017 was broadcast on Channel 4 and Sony BBC Earth. His work was heavily promoted by LensCulture.

== Plagiarism controversy ==
In a May 2017 article in PetaPixel, Datta was exposed for plagiarising elements of an image by American photographer Mary Ellen Mark for a photo project on prostitution in Calcutta in 2013. Similar evidence emerged from other sources. Datta himself gave an interview to TIME Magazine, admitting these and other allegations, including the appropriation of images for use on social media originally taken by photographer Daniele Volpe in Guatemala. The incident led to Datta's work being taken down by a number of photojournalism websites while grants and awards were withdrawn by bodies such as the Pulitzer Center, Visura, Magnum Photos and the Alexia Foundation. Datta's profile on LensCulture was suspended "due to ethical concerns". Donald Weber described Datta's conduct as "utterly mind-blowing idiocy". Datta's breach of photojournalistic ethics kicked off a round of questioning and soul-searching in the photojournalism community at large.

== Staged image on "Master of Photography" ==
Datta admitted to staging an image while a finalist on the Sky Arts television series "Master of Photography". Having been sent to photograph the daily life of Sami people tribesmen living in a frigid environment, Datta presented to the judges a nighttime image of a man with a torchlight on his head facing away from the camera and illuminating the landscape. The judges assumed that the figure was one of the tribesman Datta had been assigned to document. However, in response to a question from judge Caroline Hunter of The Guardian, Datta explained that his approach to the assignment had in fact become more interpretive, that the subject was himself and that he had staged the image to capture the northern lights. Another judge, photographer Darcy Padilla, commented that Datta had "led us to believe [his style] was more reportage" and that he "could have done some more thinking". He nevertheless progressed to the final round and was runner-up in the competition.

== Doctored images ==
Datta said sorry about the doctored images in story "China's Most Polluted Cities"The Brutal Reality of Life in China's Most Polluted Cities and the site China file decided remove the photoessay from their site. NPPA (National Press Photographer Association) from USA, mention his unethical work in photojournalism Opinon: Looking at Souvid Datta's Transgressions
