= Soumik Datta =

Bengali musician

Soumik Datta (born January 1984) is a Bengali-born British Indian musician and composer, who specialises in the sarod. He was born in Mumbai and brought up in London. His brother is the photographer and filmmaker Souvid Datta.

Sons of banker father Soumilya and writer/art-house film director mother Sangeeta Datta, Soumik and Souvid Datta both attended Harrow School and Soumik was trained in the sarod by Pandit Buddhadev Das Gupta, whom he called "grandfather". He went on to University College London, then studied at Trinity Laban Conservatoire of Music and Dance, graduating in 2009 with an MMus in Composition. In 2006, he was invited by Jay-Z to play at the Royal Albert Hall and he subsequently performed on stage with Beyoncé, but declined an offer to join her on tour.

Soumik Datta contributed to the musical scores of the films Brick Lane (2007), Life Goes On (2009), and Gangs of Tooting Broadway (2013).

In 2017, he curated a festival of music and dance at the Horniman Museum in London. In the same year, he presented Tuning 2 You: Lost Musicians of India, a documentary directed by his brother Souvid.

In June 2019, Datta performed at the Glastonbury Festival. Later in the year he was signed by Bucks Music Group.

== Albums ==
- Fretless (2009)
- Circle of Sound (2012) (with Bernhard Schimpelsberger)
- Anti-Hero (2014)
- King of Ghosts (2019)
- Jangal (2019)
- Silent Spaces (2021)
