= Chank Diesel =

Type designer

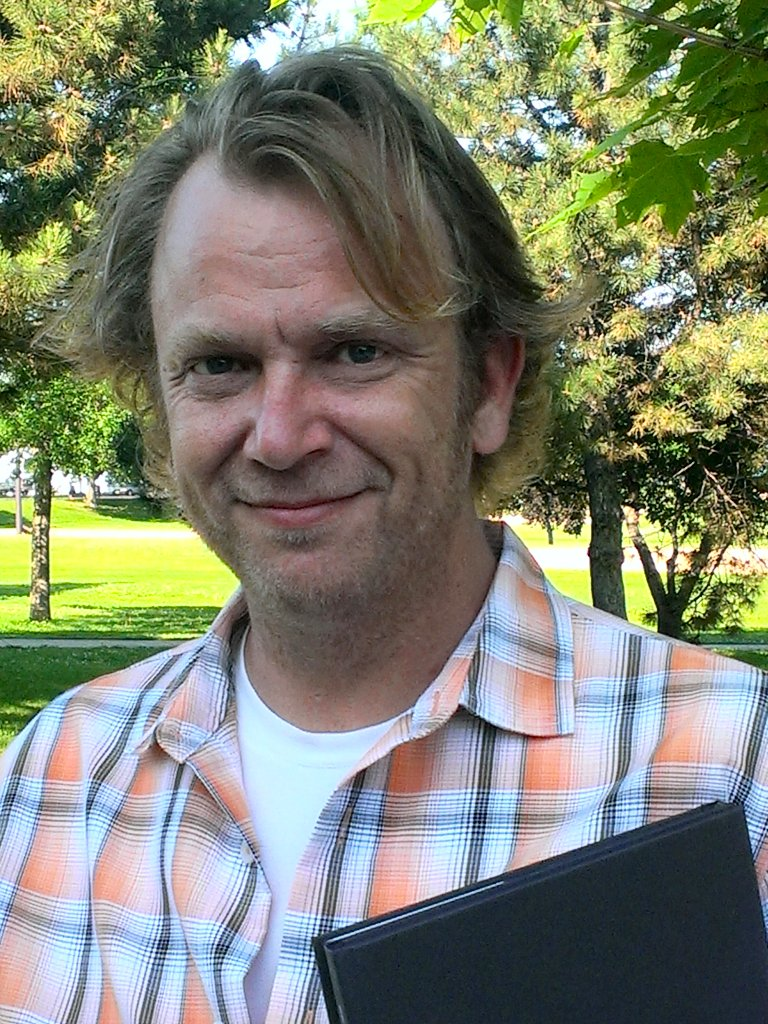
Chank Diesel in 2014

Chank Diesel, also known as Charles R. Andermack (né Anderson), is a contemporary type designer. He was born in Canada and raised in the U.S. state of Florida.

== Biography ==
Chank was born Charles Anderson, but neighbors called him "Chanky," after Spanky from the Little Rascals. The childhood name evolved to "Chank" as he grew up, and "Anderson" became "Andermack" when Chank married and combined his last name with that of his wife.

Chank was educated at Macalester College in St. Paul, Minnesota. He began designing typefaces when he was Creative Director for the alternative music magazine CAKE. During this time, he road-tripped back and forth across the country visiting designers at various record companies and earning himself the nickname "The Traveling Font Salesman." His fonts appeared on a number of album covers. Chank established his type foundry, Chank Fonts, in 1996, which he now operates from his home office in Minneapolis, Minnesota. He creates primarily display typefaces; typefaces with more personality than would usually be suitable for large bodies of text. His customers range from average computer users to professional designers. Chank creates custom fonts for corporations wanting exclusive rights to custom designed fonts, leading to his fonts' use on Taco Bell wrappers, Honeycomb cereal boxes, Tanqueray billboards, bottles of Ocean Spray cranberry drink, and movie posters for James and the Giant Peach. Chank sells his fonts (and also distributes free fonts) from his website, Chank.com. In addition to designing fonts, Chank conducts font workshops, where he explains the process of font design and creates new fonts with the help of attendees.

Some of Chank's fonts were featured in the Smithsonian's Cooper-Hewitt National Design Museum as "important examples of contemporary typography" in 1996. He was profiled in The Wall Street Journal in 1997. In 2008, he was featured in The New York Times article "Down With Helvetica: Design Your Own Font."

In addition to being a font designer, Chank is also a painter.
