= London Centre for Arts and Cultural Exchange =

Coordinates: 51.5106°N 0.1169°W

The London Centre for Arts and Cultural Exchange (LCACE) is a university initiative promoting the exchange of knowledge and expertise with the capital's arts and cultural sectors. The initiative was formed in 2004 to encourage collaboration between its partner universities and London's arts and cultural sectors. LCACE was initially funded from the Higher Education Funding Council of England's HEIF 2 Fund (Higher Education Innovation Fund). The initiative is based at Somerset House and aims to produce networking and information-based events to highlight formal Knowledge transfer initiatives such as those supported by the Arts and Humanities Research Council.

In 2011, LCACE rebranded as TCCE (The Culture Capital Exchange) and became an independent company.

The eleven universities involved with the organization as core members are the City, University of London, Guildhall School of Music and Drama, Faculty of Education, Health and Community, Liverpool John Moores University, London South Bank University, Loughborough University London, Middlesex University London, Ravensbourne University, Royal Central School of Speech and Drama, University College London, and the University of West London.

== Partners ==
LCACE university partners and core team have worked with a wide range of arts and cultural sector organisations in London on both short and long-term projects. A selection of such organisations include: Arts Council England (London) Artangel, The Art Fund, The Barbican, bfi southbank, British Library, British Museum, Bubble Theatre, Clod Ensemble, The Crafts Council, Create Kings X, ENO, Geffrye Museum, ICA, Space Media Arts, The Glass House, The Illustrious Company, Live Art Development Agency, MLA, Museum of London, National Portrait Gallery, Shakespeare's Globe, Tate Modern, Tate Britain, UK Film Council, V&A.

== Inside Out Festival ==
Inside Out is a festival curated by LCACE that showcases the contribution of nine London Universities to the capital's cultural life. The festival was first held in venues across the capital 19–25 October 2009.

Notable speakers at the 2009 festival included Michael Portillo who chaired a conference entitled 'Art: What's it good for?' at King's Place. Speakers at this event also included Nasser Azam and Julia Peyton Jones. Other events included Andrew Motion in conversation, and Professor Orlando Figes speaking on Contemporary Attitudes to The Holocaust.
