= D*Face =

British street artist

- Born: Dean Stockton
- Website: www.dface.co.uk

Dean Stockton, better known by his alias D*Face, is an English multimedia street artist who uses spray paint, stickers, posters, and stencils.

D*Face grew up in London and had a childhood interest in graffiti in drawing. He credits this to Henry Chalfant's coverage of subway graffiti in New York City in Spraycan and Subway Art, later as a teenager skateboarding and in particular Thrasher magazine's coverage of skateboard deck graphics led his interest in stickers and the DIY mentality associated with skate and punk fanzines.

He attended an illustration and design course and worked as a freelance illustrator/designer whilst honing his street work. Influences included Shepard Fairey's "Obey Giant" art campaign, Jim Philips, hip hop, punk music, and popular animated cartoons.

He held his first major London solo exhibition, Death & Glory, at the Stolenspace gallery, which sold out in October 2006. Since then, his exhibitions have included a solo show, Eyecons, at O Contemporary in Brighton in March 2007, again a sell out show. This featured new paintings, an installation and two prints — of Kurt "Kant Complain" and Cli-Che.

D*Face was the owner and curator for the Outside Institute, London's first contemporary art gallery to focus on street art. In 2005 the Outside Institute moved and re-branded to become the Stolen Space Gallery. In 2010, he collaborated with Christina Aguilera, on her album cover of Bionic. In October 2013 D*Face took part in Art Wars at the Saatchi Gallery curated by Ben Moore. The artist was issued with a stormtrooper helmet, which he transformed into a work of art. Proceeds went to the Missing Tom Fund set up by Ben Moore to find his brother Tom who has been missing for over ten years. The work was also shown on the Regents Park platform as part of Art Below Regents Park.

He participated in the 2015 edition of All City Canvas Global Series, with a mural on the façade of the Hotel Lisboa in the Colonia Roma. This project was part of the artistic activities of the Dual Year Mexico - United Kingdom.

D*Face's most recent projects was doing the cover art for the Blink-182 album California, which was released on 1 July 2016. He also designed David Beckham’s Scotch whisky brand, Haig Club, limited edition artist whiskey bottle. He designed jewelry in collaboration with the Spanish Jewelry Suárez.
