= Hayden Kays =

British artist (born 1985)

Hayden Kays (born 1985 in London) is a British artist. He is influenced by the pop art from the '50s, but has most ties with street art. He often uses a typewriter (font) in his artworks. He has sold art to celebrities such as Chris Martin, Harry Styles and Noel Fielding.

His works were collected in a monograph book in 2013, named Hayden Kays Is An Artist. (ISBN 978-0992726706)

In 2014, he made the cover art for rock bands The Kooks and the Tribes (band).

Between 2012 and 2014 Kays illustrated an anecdotal column for London’s Ham&High, written by journalist Adam Sonin, based on English Heritage’s Blue Plaque scheme, called Behind Closed Doors.
