= Philip Colbert =

British artist

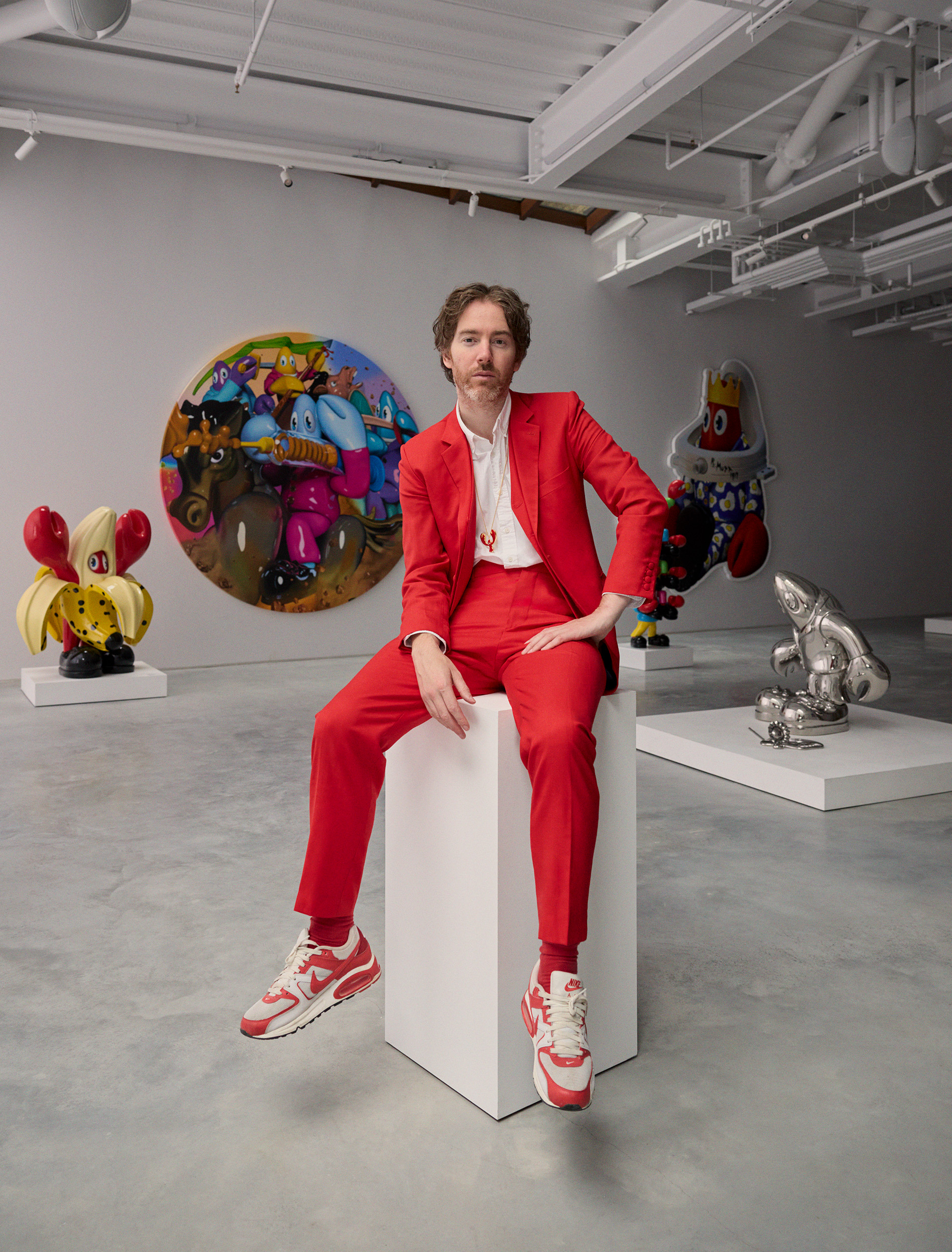
Philip Colbert

Philip Colbert is a British artist based in London, UK.

== Early life ==
Colbert was educated at Strathallan School, and the University of St Andrews. He graduated with an MA in philosophy.

== Career ==
In September 2015 Colbert designed a range of clothing as merchandise for The World Goes Pop exhibition Tate Modern. Colbert had his first large scale paintings show at Saatchi Gallery.

In 2017, the show featured Colbert's large scale pop narrative paintings featuring his Lobster Alter ego.

"We live in a world of ultra pop saturation, a sort of mega pop world where mass intake of Instagram and social media imagery merges with artistic memory," says Colbert.

In March 2022, Colbert unveiled his community art project "The Lobstars, a collection of 7777 lobster portraits, each one also serving as a citizenship card within Colbert’s digital metaverse, Lobsteropolis. Colbert’s lobster world expanded as Lobstar holders became members of an online community.

== Exhibitions ==
- 2023 Journey to the Lobster Planet - Taipei, Whitestone Gallery, Taipei
- 2023 The Myth of the Lobster Planet, Sea World Culture and Arts Center, Shenzhen
- 2023 House of the Lobster - from Pompeii to Venice, Patricia Low Venezia, Venice
- 2023 The Lobster Empire in Treviso, 21 Gallery, Treviso
- 2023 Lobsteropolis, Pearl Lam Galleries at M5 Gallery, Tokyo
- 2023 Philip Colbert Singapore Art Week, Saatchi Gallery, Singapore
- 2022 Journey to the Lobster Planet, Karuizawa New Art Museum, Karuizawa
- 2022 Dreams of Lobsteropolis, Pearl Lam Galleries, Shanghai
- 2022 The Lobster Empire in Rome, Museo di San Salvatore in Lauro, Rome
- 2022 The Lobster Empire in Rome, Via Veneto, Rome
- 2022 Lobstars in Saint Paul de Vence, De Buck Gallery, Saint Paul de Vence
- 2022 Lobster Wonderland, IFS, Changsha
- 2022 Lobstars in Venice, Venice Venice Hotel, Venice
- 2022 Dream of the Lobster Planet, The Page Gallery, Seoul
- 2021 Lobsteropolis in Taipei, Whitestone Gallery, Taipei
- 2021 Lobsteropolis in Sejong City, Mark One Art Museum, Sejong City
- 2021 Lobsteropolis in Chongqing, Chongqing Times Art Museum, Chongqing
- 2021 Lobsteropolis in Seoul, Sejong Museum of Art, Seoul
- 2021 The Death of Marat & the Birth of The Lobster, Wardlaw Museum, St Andrews 2020 Lobsteropolis, Saatchi Gallery, London
- 2020 Lobster Land in Shanghai, Modern Art Museum, Shanghai
- 2020 Lobster Land in Taipei, Whitestone Gallery, Taipei
- 2020 Lobster Land in Gstaad, Patricia Low Contemporary, Gstaad
- 2020 Lobster Land in Sofia, Structura Gallery, Sofia
- 2019 Lobster Land in Moscow, Multimedia Art Museum, Moscow
- 2019 Made in Illusion, Times Art Museum, Beijing
- 2019 Lobster Land in Seoul, Gallery Simon, Seoul
- 2019 Lobster Land in Hong Kong, Whitestone Gallery, Hong Kong
- 2019 Hunt Paintings, Saatchi Gallery, Los Angeles
- 2019 Hunt Paintings, Saatchi Gallery, London
- 2018 WaveLength:Reset, Chengdu Museum of Contemporary Art, Chengdu2014 – Sequin Pop, Gazelli Art House, London, UK
- 2018 New Paintings 2018, Galerie Nichido, Tokyo
- 2018 Looking for U, Unit London, London
- 2018 WaveLength:Reset, Powerlong Art Museum, Shanghai 2017 New Paintings, Saatchi Gallery, London
- 2016 Guess Who?, Space Gallery, St. Barths
- 2016 Guess Who?, Gazelli Art House, London
- 2015 The World Goes Pop, Tate Modern, London
- 2015 POP Punk, The Design Exchange, Toronto
- 2015 Inspired, Van Gogh Museum, Amsterdam
- 2015 Het Noordbrabants Museum, s-Hertogenbosch
- 2014 Sequin Pop, Gazelli Art House, London

== Personal life ==
Colbert is married to artist and screenwriter Charlotte Colbert. They have two children and reside in Lewes, East Sussex.
