= Jason Ostro =

American visual artist and gallery owner

- Born: Happy Valley, Pennsylvania
- Known for: street art, gallery, contemporary art, community outreach
- Movement: contemporary art, street art gallery
- Website: www.gabbagallery.com/about/

Jason Ostro is an American visual artist and gallery owner best known for his East Los Angeles Alley Project which was touted for turning "blight to bright" in the Los Angeles Times in 2015. That same year, Ostro was listed as one of the "8 Best Art Curators in Los Angeles" by CBS Los Angeles.

== Gabba Gallery ==
Ostro founded the Gabba Gallery in 2012 in Historic Filipinotown as a space where he could exhibit contemporary urban and street art. Showcasing art from a variety of disciplines– photography, street, design, collage and fine art – Gabba Gallery is a cultural haven that embodies, as Time Out Los Angeles describes: "eclectic cool."

Recent exhibitions include “Wish List,” an annual holiday exhibition that features work by vibrant local street artists.

In addition to exhibiting work inside the gallery, Ostro had the idea to transform the surrounding gang territory neighborhood with art. To do this, he curated over 80 local and international artists to paint over 90 murals side-by-side on outdoor surfaces ranging from garage doors to dumpsters. Securing support from the local community, Ostro went door to door to speak to each homeowner near the Gabba Gallery to gain permission before using any building exterior as a canvas. The purpose of the project extends beyond the murals and is equally about neighborhood transformation, local pride and community outreach.

The Alley Project includes murals by several of the most significant contemporary street artists and muralists, including: Bisco Smith, WRDSMTH, thrashbird, Annie Preece, Stormie Mills, Anthony Lister, Dourone, Jules Muck, DabsMyla and Rene Gagnon. Since the murals are residential, they are not immediately visible; however, Ostro has painted "Art!" with directional arrows on sidewalks and signs to guide art enthusiasts without disrupting the community.

Ostro has created a satellite mural project in the Echo Park neighborhood of Los Angeles, called "Animal Alley L.A," showcasing animal-themed murals by over 15 artists. Additionally, Ostro has been approached by groups in Atlanta, St. Louis and Asheville to spearhead similar community mural initiatives those cities.

== Visual Art ==
Beginning his pursuit as a fine artist at an early age using crayons to doodle designs, Ostro has evolved his practice to painting both canvases but also murals across the United States.
