= The McLoughlin Gallery =

Coordinates: 37°47′15.7″N 122°24′15.4″W

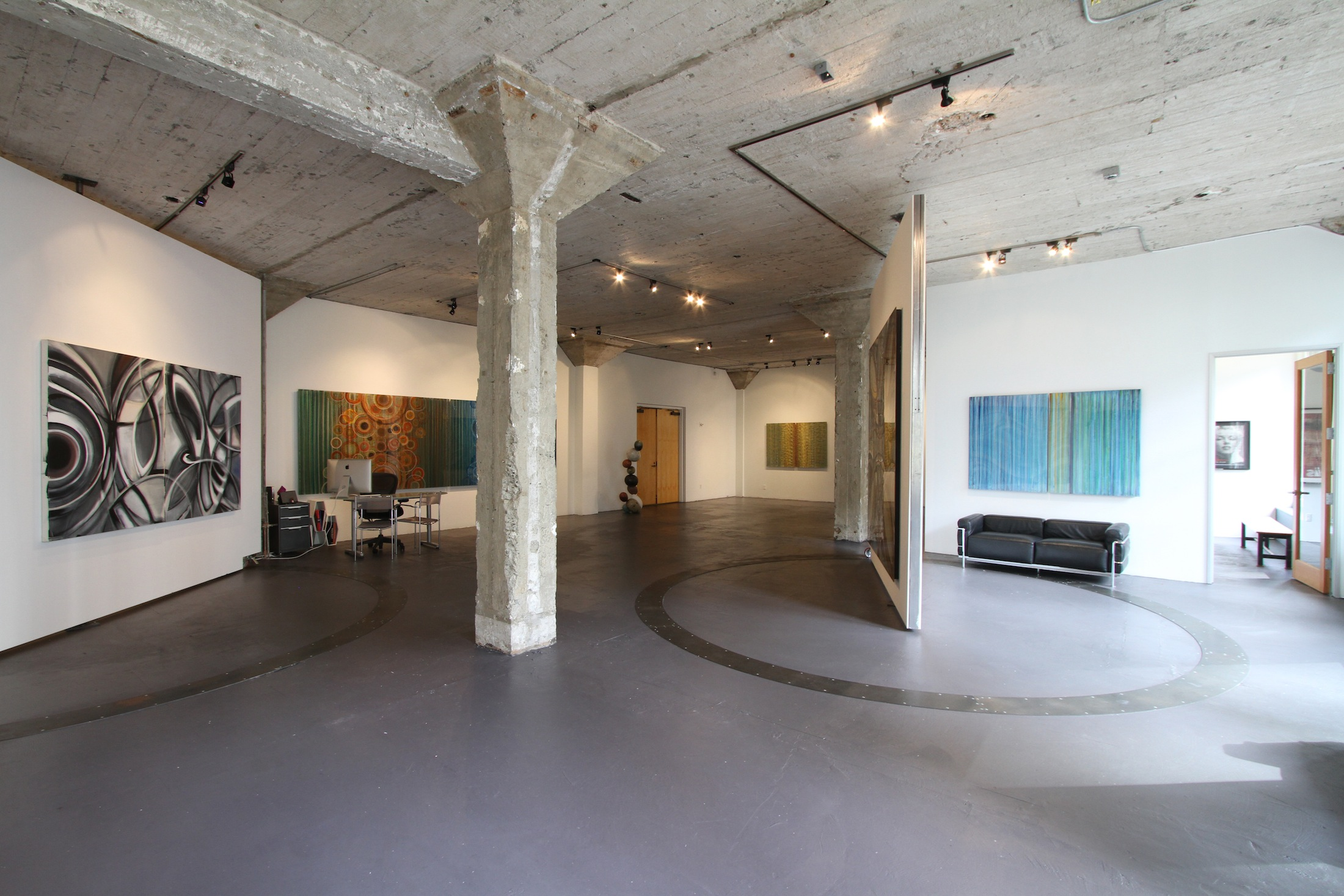
- McLoughlin Gallery
- Established: 2010
- Location: 49 Geary St., Suite 200; San Francisco, California, United States
- Director: Johnny Sampson
- Owner: Joan McLoughlin
- Public transit access: Bay Area Rapid Transit Montgomery Street Station
- Parking: Fifth & Mission Yerba Buena Garage and Ampco System Parking
- Website: www.mgart.com

The McLoughlin Gallery was an art gallery established in 2010 by Joan McLoughlin that presented contemporary art from mid-career and emerging artists. The gallery was located at 49 Geary Street, Suite 200 San Francisco, California, United States. The McLoughlin gallery was the third largest space at 49 Geary. Artists at the gallery worked with a variety of different, and sometimes non-traditional, materials including: resins, plastics, Xeroxes, glitter, wood panel, acrylic and found objects.

== History ==
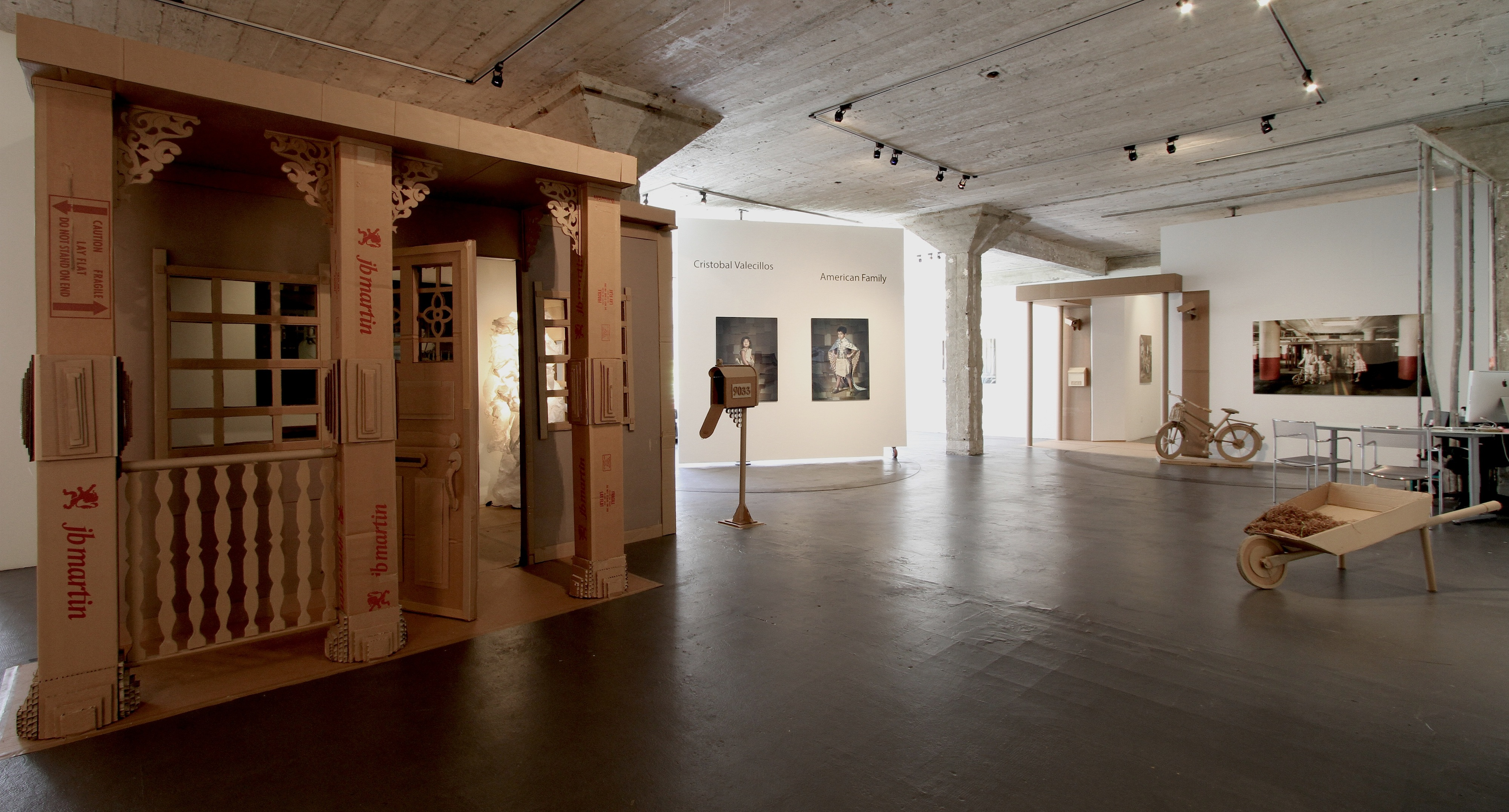
Valecilllos exhibit.

Joan McLoughlin was a long-time art enthusiast and collector and worked as an executive at startup medical device companies before she founded her gallery. After being diagnosed with breast cancer, McLoughlin's appreciation for art deepened, and found that her treatments gave her time to reflect on what she truly wanted to do with her life. After significant reflection, she decided to pursue one of her long-time dreams, and opened the McLoughlin Gallery. McLoughlin made the decision to donate a percentage of the gallery's net sales profits to Glide Memorial Church and the Stanford University Medical Center's breast cancer research, a practice that is uncommon for art galleries. The gallery shows contemporary art from both local and international (mostly European) artists. The gallery put an emphasis on discovering and developing San Francisco artists, while also including artists from abroad, through their shows.

The McLoughlin Gallery opened in October 2010, the month of October holding a special significance to McLoughlin because it is Breast Cancer Awareness Month. The gallery's first major exhibit, "Warmth is Movement," opened in February 2011. In June 2011, the McLoughlin Gallery was featured as one of 7x7 Magazine's five most exciting new galleries in San Francisco. In their article, they remark that the gallery has rapidly "become a reputable (and the third largest) space in the prestigious 49 Geary art complex." In March 2013, the American Art Awards selected McLoughlin gallery as one of their "25 Best Galleries in America". In June 2013, the Miami New Times remarked that in the short time the gallery had been open, Mcloughlin had built a group of artists that had their work featured in "major museums and collections." In addition to the gallery's in-house exhibitions, the gallery featured their artists at a number of fine art fairs, including the Los Angeles Art Show, the San Francisco Fine Art Fair, ArtPadSF and Context Art Miami.

== Exhibitions ==
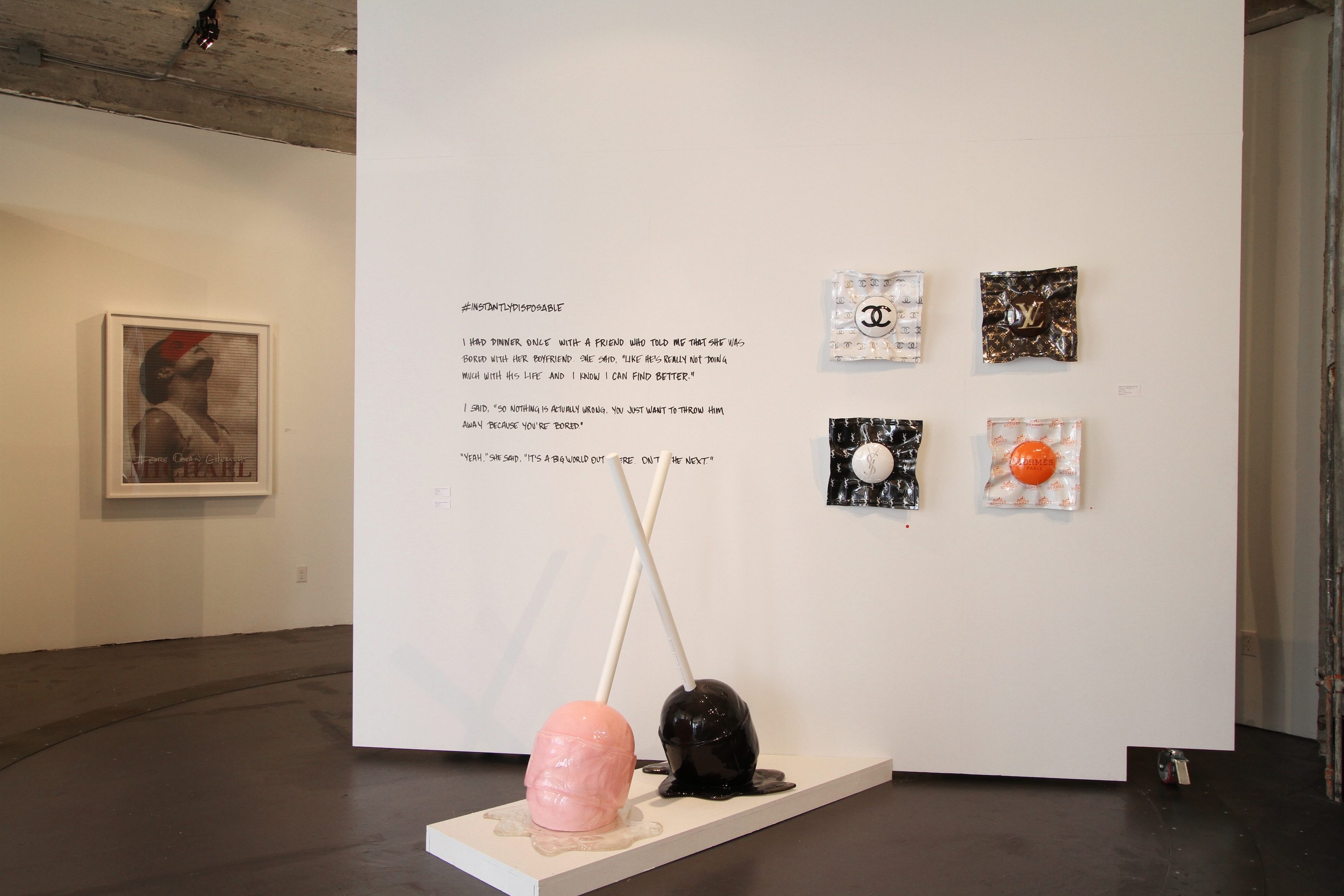
Desire Obtain Cherish (DOC) Installation at McLoughlin Gallery.

The McLoughlin gallery's exhibitions received favorable reviews. Sculpture Magazine recognized one of McLoughlin's exhibitions featuring the work of David Middlebrook as being remarkable for Middlebrook's successful execution of the "technical and aesthetic" challenges that arose from his decision to stick to traditional materials such as wood, stone, and metal. Lisa Derrick at The Huffington Post singled out a work exhibited by a McLoughlin artist Desire Obtain Cherish (DOC) at the Los Angeles Art Show as the single best piece exhibited in the show in 2013. The Fog City Journal praised one of Mcloughlin's exhibitions for its artist Doug Thielscher's struggle to use century's old materials and techniques to convey a modern narrative that is compelling and "emotionally charged." Laura Kimpton's exhibition at McLoughlin titled "Flying Solo", which uses recycled materials to create mixed media pieces, was featured in KPIX-TV's "Eye on the Bay" program which described it as a "stunning retrospective of her impressive body of work." "Flying Solo" and the McLoughlin gallery were also profiled by CBS Radio News reporter Brian Banmiller in a "Banmiller on Business" piece titled "Re-usable art."

== See also ==
- Christopher H. Martin
- Kirstine Roepstorff
- Cosimo Cavallaro
- John Waguespack
