= Background Bob =

British artist (2008–2023)

Noah Jones
- Born: 21 August 2008
- Died: 20 November 2023 (aged 15)
- Other name: Background Bob
- Known for: Art collaborations

Noah Jones (21 August 2008 – 20 November 2023), nicknamed Background Bob, was a British teenage artist from Dedham, Essex, whose art projects raised over £250,000 for the hospital trust that treated him for hydrocephalus, epilepsy, and cerebral palsy. Along with his father, some of his most notable collaborators included Shepard Fairey, Grayson Perry, Ben Eine, My Dog Sighs, The London Police, Wrdsmith, Ed Sheeran, as well as numerous other street artists and celebrities.

== Biography ==
Noah was born in 2008 with hydrocephalus, epilepsy, and cerebral palsy. His father is Nathan Jones, a painter and decorator. He lived with his family in Dedham, Essex. At the age of 11 and unable to attend school in spring of 2020, during the first COVID-19 lockdown in the United Kingdom, he began to paint on cardboard. Subsequently, artists from around the world responded to his father's Instagram request for collaborators. Noah painted the background and noted artists painted images on them. Over 250 international artists, including My Dog Sighs, Anna Schellberg, Pez, Trust.iCON, Carne Griffiths and Silent Bill, sent their creations. Others included Ed Sheeran, Shepard Fairey, WRDSMTH, Grayson Perry, and Phill Jupitus. The aim was to auction the completed paintings to raise money for the Colchester and Ipswich Hospitals Charity.

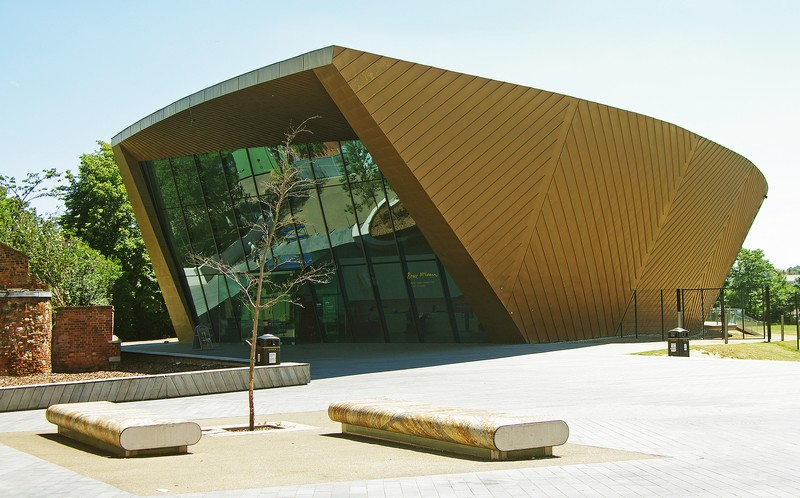
Firstsite art gallery in Colchester

The first exhibition was held at Firstsite, Colchester, in October 2020. The artwork displayed "the thoughts, feelings and experiences of lockdown". Many were exhibited and sold, with the proceeds going to charity. A collection of the paintings was published in a book, Background Bob and His Amazing Friends. Along with the A5 copies, there were 50 special edition books containing paintings by Noah himself. By autumn of 2023, Background Bob and His Amazing Friends book number three was published, on a background of three exhibitions, and three auctions.

Noah died on 20 November 2023, at the age of 15.
