= The Producer BDB =

American street artist

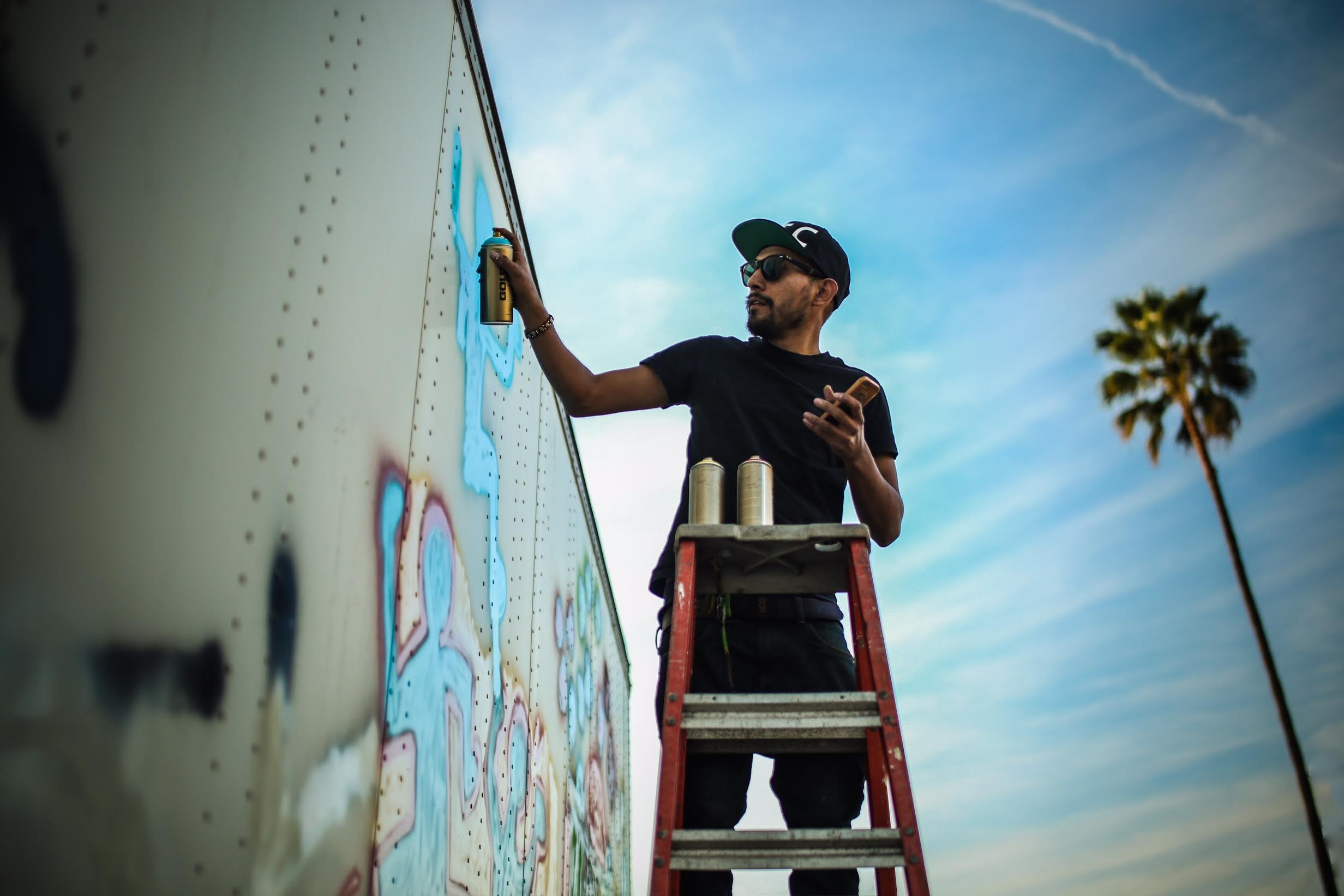
- Bryan Avila
- Born: December 19, 1984 (age 41); Riverside, California, US.
- Style: Street art, pop art, figuration
- Movement: Street art, pop art
- Website: theproducerbdb.com

Bryan Avila, also known as The Producer BDB, was born in Riverside, California. He currently lives and works out the city of Los Angeles.

In his artworks there are characters such as Frida Kahlo, Andy Warhol, Karl Lagerfeld, Anna Wintour, Hillary Clinton, John Lennon and others. He often collaborates with other artist such as Flore, Chris Brown and Karen Bystedt.

His mural work can be found in cities such as Paris, Madrid, Rio de Janeiro, Miami, Berlin, Tokyo, Singapore, Hong Kong, Seoul, and Los Angeles.

== Artistic career ==
The early stages of his career where marked by a series of mural works. He traveled around the globe and created murals on the cities of Paris, Madrid, Rio de Janeiro, Miami, Berlin and Los Angeles.

His artwork is heavily influenced by pop culture, fashion, music, art, history and technology.

== Selected exhibitions ==
- May 2017, The Art of Rock & Graffiti, Bunkamura Gallery, Tokyo, Japan
- April 2017, Who's Next? Banksy Vs. Next Generation, Gallery 21| Odaiba, Japan
- February 2017, TommyLand, Tommy Hilfiger Fashion Show, Venice Beach, California
- December 2016, 2016 Art Basel Miami, Oliver Cole Gallery, Miami, Florida
- June 2016, 2016 World Graffiti Arts, Gallery 21, Tokyo, Japan
- June 2016, Plastic Jesus & The Producer BDB, Bruce Lurie, Los Angeles, California
- May 2016, The Producer BDB at Maui, Mouche Contemporary, Wailea, Maui
- December 2015, Port of Angels, CVC Project Space, Miami, Florida
- November 2015, Noche de Altares, Marcas Contemporary, Santa Ana, California
- October 2015, Flore & The Producer BDB Have Landed at Mouche, Mouche Contemporary, Los Angeles, California
- October 2015, BotArt International, West Edge Design, Santa Monica, California
- September 2015, Delta Sky Lounge BDB, LAX Airport, Los Angeles, California
- July 2015, In-tl-ekts x BDB, INTLCTS, Pomona, California
- April 2015, The Producer BDB & Moncho 1929, Bruce Lurie, Culver City, California
- March 2015, Open Gallery Launch, Gallery 38, West Adams, California
- November 2014, Lost Warhols, Bruce Lurie, Culver City, California
- November 2014, El Velorio, BoatHouse Gallery, Plaza de la Raza, Los Angeles, California

== Art fairs ==
- May 2017, Tokyo International Art Fair, Tokyo, Japan
- April 2017, Art Market San Francisco, San Francisco, California
- April 2017, Affordable Art Fair Singapore| Singapore, Singapore
- March 2017, Art Boca Raton, Boca Raton, Florida
- February 2017, Art Wynwood, Wynwood, Florida
- February 2017, Art Palm Springs, Palm Springs, California
- January 2017, Art Palm Beach, West Palm Beach, Florida
- January 2017, LA Art Show, Los, Angeles, California
- December 2016, Scope Miami Beach| Miami Beach, Florida
- December 2016, RedDot Miami| Miami, Florida
- November 2016, New York Art, Antiques and Jewelry Show, New York, New York
- September 2016, Affordable Art Fair, New York, New York
- September 2016, Houston Art Fair, Houston, Texas
- August 2016, Art Aspen, Aspen, Colorado
- June 2016, Art Hamptons, Bridgehampton, New York
- April 2016, Affordable Art Fair, New York, New York
- March 2016, Scope NYC, New York, New York
- February 2016, Palm Springs Fine Art Fair, Palm Springs, California
- January 2016, LA Art Show, Los Angeles, California
- December 2015, RedDot Miami| Miami, Florida
- April 2015, Love Art Toronto, New York, New York
- March 2015, Art Boca Raton, Miami, Florida
- October 2015, Street Art Fair, Los Angeles, California
- September 2015, Affordable Art Fair, New York, New York
- September 2015, Houston Fine Art Fair, Houston, Texas
- August 2015, Art Aspen, Aspen, Colorado
- July 2015, Art Hamptons, Bridgehampton, New York
- March 2015, Affordable Art Fair, New York, New York

== Film and video ==
- Artumentary - The Producer BDB. Prod. Equator Productions. Perf. The Producer BDB. Equator Productions, 2015. Web Video.

== Articles and press ==
- The Producer BDB in WWD Japan
- The Producer BDB in Artnet
- The Producer BDB in Huffington Post
- The Producer BDB in Art Above Reality
- The Producer BDB in Bancs Media
- The Producer BDB in Artsy Magazine
- The Producer BDB in Stylabl

== Books and references ==
- Hirugami, Erika. "The Birth of a Global Empire" Published by CuratorLove. June 2016.
