= Christopher Martin =

Christopher Martin may refer to:

== Music ==
- Chris Martin (born 1977), English singer-songwriter for Coldplay
- Christopher Martin (rapper) (born 1962), American rapper, known as Play, from the duo Kid 'n Play
- Christopher Martin (singer) (born 1987), reggae singer/songwriter from Jamaica
- Christopher Martin (trumpeter), American trumpet player
- DJ Premier (Christopher Martin, born 1966), American DJ and record producer

== Others ==
- Christopher Martin (bobsleigh) (born 1945), Canadian Olympic bobsledder
- Christopher Martin (Mayflower passenger) (c. 1582–1621), English pilgrim on The Mayflower
- Christopher C. Martin, American architect
- Christopher H. Martin (born 1969), American abstract artist

== See also ==
- Christopher Martin-Jenkins (1945–2013), cricket journalist
- Christopher Martin Peña (born 1986), Mexican American boxer
- Chris Martin (disambiguation)
- Christy Martin (disambiguation)
- Christian Martin (disambiguation)
- Christina Martin (born 1980), comedian
- Christopher Martins Pereira (born 1997), Luxembourgish footballer
