= Waguespack =

Waguespack is a surname. Notable people with the surname include:

- Jacob Waguespack (born 1993), American baseball player
- John Waguespack (born 1971), American artist and entrepreneur
- Scott Waguespack (born 1970), American politician
