= Chris Martin (disambiguation) =

Chris Martin (born 1977) is an English musician, best known for being the frontman of the British rock band Coldplay.

Chris Martin is also the name of:

== In sports ==
- Chris Martin (linebacker) (born 1960), American NFL linebacker
- Chris Martin (defensive back) (born 1974), former professional American football defensive back
- Chris Martin (offensive lineman) (born 1990), American NFL offensive lineman
- Chris Martin (baseball) (born 1986), baseball player
- Chris Martin (cricketer) (born 1974), New Zealand cricketer
- Chris Martin (footballer, born 1988), Scottish striker for Bristol Rovers
- Chris Martin (footballer, born 1990), English goalkeeper for Mickleover Sports
- Chris Martin (motorcyclist) (born 1981), British motorcycle racer
- Chris Martin (rower) (born 1981), English oarsman
- Chris Martin (athlete) (born 1971), Paralympic athlete from Great Britain
- Chris Martin, Commissioner of the College Conference of Illinois and Wisconsin
- Chris Martin (boxing trainer) (1964–2023)
- Chris Martin (rugby union) (born 1961), English rugby union player

== In arts and entertainment ==
- DJ Premier (born 1966), real name Chris Martin, American hip-hop producer
- Chris Martin (artist) (born 1954), American painter
- Chris William Martin (born 1975), Canadian actor
- Chris Martin (Scottish actor), Scottish actor
- Chris Martin (comedian) (born 1986), English stand-up comedian and writer
- Chris Martin, American vocalist in Hostage Calm
- Chris Martin, American guitarist in Kinski

== Other ==
- Chris Martin (civil servant) (1973–2015), British civil servant

== See also ==
- Christian Martin (disambiguation)
- Christy Martin (disambiguation)
- Christina Martin (born 1980), comedian
- Christopher Martin (disambiguation)
- Chris-Pin Martin (1893–1953), American character actor
