= Mat Benote =

American artist

Mat Benote is a contemporary American artist associated with the graffiti urban art movement. He is most commonly known for placing fine art in museums and public spaces. His work has been displayed in many museums including the Guggenheim in New York City and the Los Angeles County Museum. He is a proponent of the "gifted" art and "added" art movements.

One of his more interesting stunts to date was an exhibition of a single painting split into twelve different sections and displayed in twelve different museums. The work acted basically like a giant puzzle with the pieces spread all over the nation. The Joslyn Museum of Art in Omaha announced soon after receiving, that their section was going into the museum's permanent collection.

== See also ==
- Graffiti
- Urban culture
- Art graffiti
- Street art
- Gifted art
