= Stefan Smit =

South African artist

Stefan Smit (born 10 February 1990, Johannesburg, South Africa), is a contemporary South African fine artist.

== History ==
Born in 1990 in Johannesburg, South Africa, Smit was raised in a creative family. His father, Etienne Smit, is a writer who authored a novel and worked in the film industry. Stefan's paternal grandmother, Mona Smit, and uncle, Ben Smit, were both artists. These creative influences played a central role in Stefan's upbringing. By age ten, Smit had started to work on his collection of sketchbooks and drawings that he still has today. At nineteen, Smit attended the Campus Of Performing Arts to study classical piano, all the while honing his artistic skills by attending live figure drawing classes at a local town hall in Johannesburg. In 2012, Smit left his career in music to dedicate himself to a career as a fine artist. After ten years in Johannesburg, Smit relocated to Cape Town in 2022.

== Work and subject matter ==
As a South African, Smit has been influenced by socio-political factors and the diversity of cultures in his home country. The overriding theme in Smit's work is human connection and the physical, economic, or emotional distances between people that either draw them together or push them apart. In his expression of these concepts, Smit explores the interconnected nature of the built and natural environments with the psychological and emotional states of the individuals within them

== Exhibitions ==
2022:

- ‘32nd Annual Miniature Show’ - Abend Gallery, USA
- ‘International Public Art Festival’ - Cape Town

2021:

- ‘31st Annual Miniature Show’ - Abend Gallery, USA
- The LA Art Show - USA
- ‘5 X 5 Exhibition’ - Abend Gallery, USA
- ‘Contemporary Figuration’ - Abend Gallery, USA

2020:

- ‘5 X 5 Exhibition’ - Abend Gallery, USA
- ‘BOUND’ Solo Exhibition - Abend Gallery, USA
- ‘Small Works Show’ - Abend Gallery, USA
- ‘30th Annual Mini Show’ - Abend Gallery, USA
- ‘International Public Art Festival’ - Cape Town

2019:

- ‘Optimism’ - Lizamore Gallery, Johannesburg
- ‘Greyscale’ - The Viewing Room Gallery, Pretoria
- ‘Birds’ - Rust en Vrede Gallery, Cape Town
- ‘Fases’ - Art on Avenues, Somerset West

2018:

- ‘CURB’ Solo Exhibition - GTC, Johannesburg

2017:

- Group Show - Gallery One11, Cape Town
- ‘Untitled’ Co-Solo Exhibition - Bruuns Galeri, Denmark
- Rotary Exhibition - Hyde Park, Johannesburg
- The Gavin Project - Johannesburg
- Joburg Fringe Fair - Johannesburg
- The Bag Factory - Johannesburg
- Daville Baillee Gallery - Johannesburg

2016:

- ‘IMPRINT/BLUEPRINT’ Co-solo exhibition - 99 Loop, Cape Town
- Spasie Gallery - Cape Town

2015:

- ‘Figures & Forms’ - Hyde Park, Johannesburg
- ABSA Gallery – Johannesburg CBD
- Gallery Momo – Rosebank, Johannesburg
- Gallery on 6th – Parkhurst, Johannesburg
- Westdene Walls Project - Westdene, Johannesburg
