= Christian Martin =

Christian Martin may refer to:

- Christian Martin (television executive) (born 1967)
- Christian Frederick Martin (1796–1873), luthier

== See also ==
- Chris Martin (disambiguation)
- Christian Martínez (disambiguation)
- Christopher Martin (disambiguation)
