= Karen Bystedt =

American visual artist and photographer

Karen Bystedt קרן ביסדט
- Born: Karen Hardy; Israel
- Known for: photography, contemporary art, collaborations
- Movement: contemporary art, photography
- Website: www.karenbystedt.com

Karen Bystedt (Hebrew: קרן ביסדט) is an American visual artist and photographer who was born in Israel and grew up in London, San Francisco and Los Angeles. Bystedt is best known for a series of photographs she took of Andy Warhol in 1982 and for the collaborations she has done with other artists, such as Chris Brown, using these images as the base for the designs. In 2014, LA Weekly included one of Bystedt's murals in their list of the top ten murals in the city.

== Photography ==
=== "The Lost Warhols" ===
In 1982, Bystedt was a student at New York University working on a photography book of male models. Inspired by the modeling Warhol had done the year prior for Barney's in GQ Magazine, Bystedt wanted to include him in her project. Although Warhol rarely participated in shoots where he was a model rather than the artist, he agreed to let Bystedt photograph him at his iconic studio, The Factory.

For the sitting, Warhol dressed himself in a tweed Perry Ellis sports coat, wore a neatly combed white toupee, rather than his signature "fright wig," and held a miniature American flag.

Bystedt took 36 frames of Warhol and published two of them in her book of male models, Not Just Another Pretty Face. The negatives were then placed in storage and subsequently lost until 2011 when Bystedt rediscovered ten of them. Since then, Bystedt has exhibited "The Lost Warhols" in group and solo exhibitions internationally, including Los Angeles, New York and Portugal.

== "Andy Goes Street" ==
Taking her 1982 series into the contemporary scene, Bystedt has collaborated with street artists, fine artists and muralists to reinvigorate her photographs. For instance, in 2011 Bystedt and text-based artist Peter Tunney did a live installation at Art Basel in the renowned Wynwood district and in 2013, eight of her Warhol photographs were projected on the Videotron above the Key Club on the Sunset Strip in Los Angeles. These projections inspired Bystedt to collaborate with other visual artists using her images as the foundation creating mixed media art.

Among these collaborations, the most publicly recognized is the series she did in 2015 with musician and visual artist Chris Brown.

In the summer of 2016, Bystedt exhibited her "The Lost Warhols" in Portugal collaborating with international artists and producing the first mural on the streets of Vilamoura.

=== Collaborations ===
Among Bystedt's street and fine art collaborators are: Peter Tunney, Gregory Siff, Bill Barminsky, Speedy Graphito, Bradley Theodore, Cryptik, Drew Merrit, Annie Preece, the Producer BDB, Moncho 1929, Magne Furuholmen and Chris Brown.

=== "The Gold Kollection" ===
In 2016, Bystedt began a new series, "The Gold Kollection," including a nude self-portrait of the artist covered in gilded body paint. This image evolved into “The Kings Kollection," a series of mixed-media art combining Bystedt's Warhol photographs with an iconic photograph of Jean-Michel Basquiat taken by Brad Branson in 1984.

== Permanent Collections ==
"The Lost Warhols" are included in the permanent collections of several museums and foundation collections around the world, including: The Andy Warhol Museum, Astrup Fearnley Museum of Modern Art, the Armenian Museum of Modern Art and the Hearst Foundation. In 2012, Bystedt donated a work to an amFAR Milan auction which raised 50,000 euros for AIDS research.

== Publications ==
Bystedt has published four books combining interviews with her photography: Not Just Another Pretty Face (1983), The New Breed (1988), They Dared to Dream (2009) and Before They Were Famous (1992), a collection of intimate photographs and candid interviews of actors taken before their rise to fame.
