= Cristian Martínez =

Cristian Martínez may refer to:

- Cristian Martínez (Paraguayan footballer) (born 1983), Paraguayan football left midfielder
- Cristian Martínez (Colombian footballer) (born 1988), Colombian football forward
- Cristian Martínez (Andorran footballer) (born 1989), Andorran football winger
- Cristian Martínez (Panamanian footballer) (born 1997), Panamanian football midfielder

== See also ==
- Christian Martínez (disambiguation)
- Christian Martinez (musician), French musician
- Cristhian Martínez (born 1982), Dominican baseball player
