= Added art =

Visual art genre

Added Art uses an existing piece of artwork for its canvas, just as traditional graffiti uses the wall of a building for the canvas. It is essentially the graffiti of artwork. Added Art is a merging of high and low art, using the concepts of graffiti, in a high art environment. Adding to someone else's work has been a very common occurrence in graffiti for decades. In the urban environment, it is typically considered aggressive or antagonistic in nature, but also form of competition. However, it is still considered a taboo in the more established high arts, even though it has been practiced for over fifty years by stalwarts such as Rauschenberg in his Erased de Kooning Drawing. In more recent examples, Banksy has done several added art pieces over Damien Hirst's "spot" painting, and Mat Benote used an untitled work by Robert Morris at the MoMA in NYC as a canvas. A very interesting example was done by the Chapman Brothers, who painted over sketches originally created by Adolf Hitler.

== See also ==
- Graffiti
- Art graffiti
