= WRDSMTH =

WRDSMTH (artist)
- Known for: street art, contemporary art, collaborations
- Movement: contemporary art, street art
- Website: www.wrdsmth.com

WRDSMTH is a Los Angeles–based street artist known for his iconic image of a vintage typewriter featuring different sheets of inspirational text. Spraypainting and wheatpasting outdoor walls with thousands of works since 2013, WRDSMTH can be found in cities throughout the world, including: London, Paris, New York City, Philadelphia and New Orleans. In 2017, he installed eight large-scale art pieces at The Bloc in Downtown Los Angeles as part of their permanent collection.

== Background ==
The artist behind WRDSMTH used to reside in Chicago and worked in advertising. He moved to Los Angeles to pursue writing and became a published author in 2012. Tired of being trapped behind his computer, WRDSMTH had the idea to integrate his love of writing with his interest in street art and developed his signature tag in 2013 for which he has become widely known: an image of a vintage typewriter below a page of motivational and original text, sometimes inspired by his creative process.

== Collaborations ==
WRDSMTH has collaborated with several other contemporary street artists, including: Teachr, Colette Miller, Antigirl, Thrashbird, Kai Aspire and Bandit.
