= John Waguespack =

American-born artist and entrepreneur (born 1971)

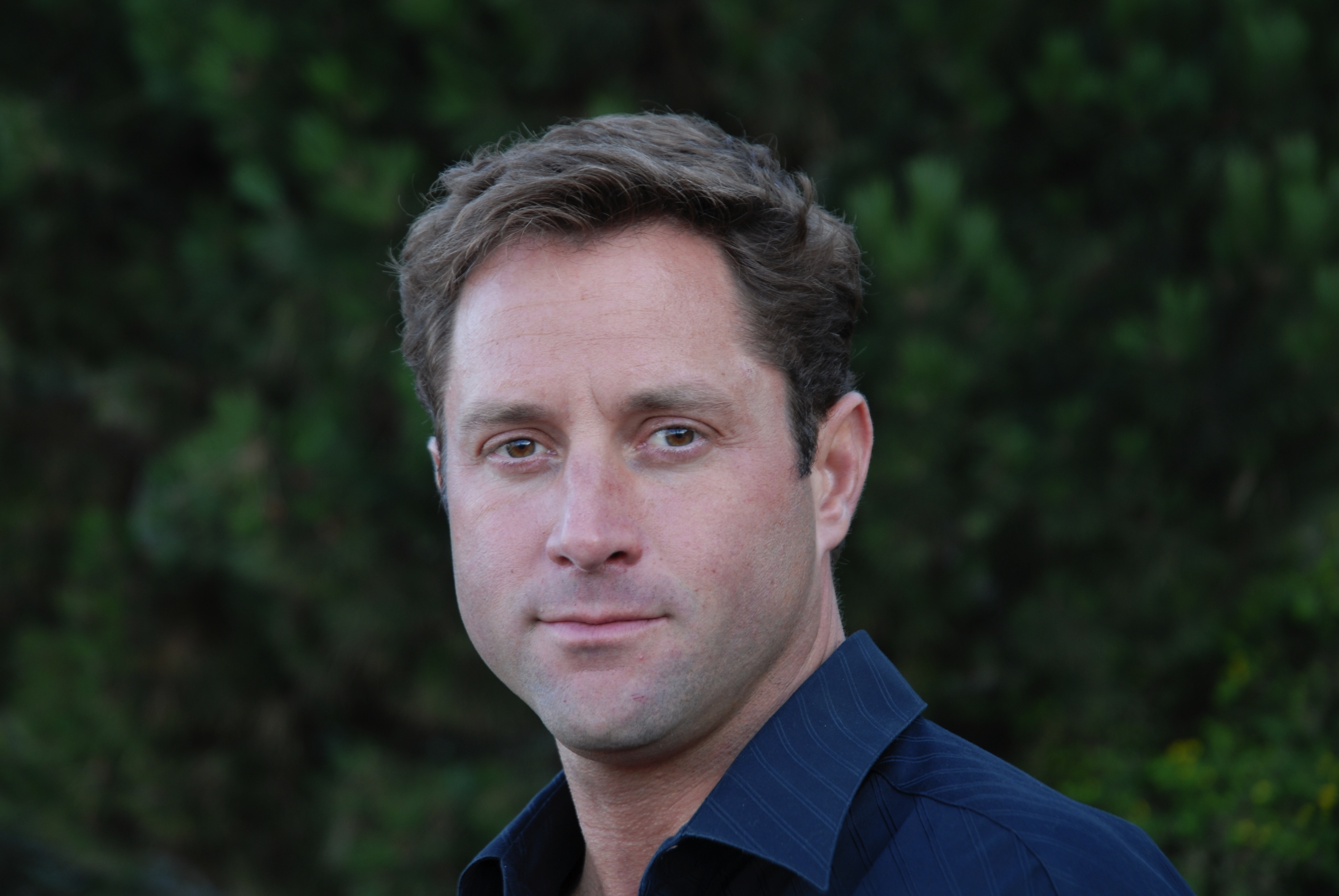
- Born: 29 July 1971 (age 54)
- Known for: Painting
- Movement: Expressionism

John Waguespack (born July 29, 1971) is an American-born artist and entrepreneur.

== Life ==
John Waguespack was born in Atlanta, Georgia. He attended Boston College, where he earned a BS in Business. He then worked in the financial field in Philadelphia and then for a technology start-up in the San Francisco Bay Area. After that company went bankrupt in 1998, Waguespack returned to Atlanta to attend the Portfolio Center and changed careers. He came back to San Francisco to work for an advertising agency from 2000 to 2005, before deciding to become a full-time artist.

== Art career ==
Waguespack’s art has been exhibited at Art Basel Miami’s SCOPE Art Show (where he was one of nine artists nationwide to be showcased, in conjunction with Russell Simmons’ Rush Philanthropic Arts Foundation and the Bombay Sapphire Artisan Series), The Los Angeles Art Show, San Francisco Fine Art Fair, Art Miami CONTEXT, Art Silicon Valley, Art Pad SF, and Art Aspen.

He has participated in solo exhibitions at Rocha Art, The McLoughlin Gallery, 111 Minna Gallery, and Heath Gallery. John's work has been included in group exhibitions at Ian Ross Gallery (now Rocha Art, The Los Angeles Center for Digital Arts, New Coast Studios, and The Griffin Gallery.

John experiments continuously in a variety of mediums using the environment as inspiration as well as an influence on the construction of the work itself. He creates works covering a broad spectrum of styles, including abstract expressionism, surreal pop, linear deconstruction, as well as his own signature reincarnation series.

His painting, "Pause," purchased by restaurateur Gary Danko, was featured on the cover of the January 2013 issue of the Nob Hill Gazette. His artwork has adorned the cover of San Francisco’s 7x7 Magazine. Waguespack's 2015 solo exhibition at Rocha Art called "Channeling The Dionysian" was referenced in The San Francisco Examiner

== Philanthropy ==
John works with ArtSpan.org, Project Open Hand in San Francisco, UCSF Alliance Health Project Art for AIDS, The San Francisco AIDS Foundation, Spotlight on Art in Atlanta, and The Trevor Project.

== Awards ==
Waguespack was nominated for a SECA award from the San Francisco Museum of Modern Art. He was selected to represent San Francisco in the Bombay Sapphire Artisan Series national art competition at Scope during Art Basel Miami in 2012.
