= Justin Bua =

American painter

Justin BUA
- Born: March 29, 1968 (age 58)
- Education: Art Center College of Design
- Known for: Figure drawing, graffiti and illustration
- Website: justinbua.com

Justin BUA (born March 29, 1968) is an American artist, author, speaker and entrepreneur. He currently lives in Texas and is best known for his lyrical narrative paintings of musicians, DJs and similar characters who help define the urban landscape.

== Early life and education ==
BUA grew up on the Upper West Side of New York City in the 1970s and 80s, during the height of the graffiti movement. Inspired by the hip-hop, breakdancing and graffiti he saw around him, BUA began tagging under the moniker “Just-1” before eventually becoming a painter. Fascinated by the raw, vibrant street life of the city, BUA's subjects range from anonymous members of the culture, like DJs and MCs, to recognizable figures like hip hop artists and UFC fighters. BUA attended Manhattan's Fiorello H. LaGuardia High School of Music and Performing Arts and graduated from the Art Center College of Design in Pasadena, California in 1992 where he earned a B.F.A in painting.

== Career ==
=== Fine Art ===
BUA's distinctive figurative style combines his classical training with his background in graffiti, breakdancing and experience living in New York City. The subjects of his paintings range from recognizable figures, such as Snoop Dogg and Muhammad Ali, to anonymous people pulled from his memories, including the DJ and guitar player for which he has become well-known. In the early 1990s, BUA turned several of these paintings into best-selling posters, making fine art accessible to a broad range of people, including college students and young graffiti and music enthusiasts. BUA's poster of the DJ has sold over 11 million copies worldwide.

Many of BUA's subjects are de facto father figures, men he saw as resilient and present, when his own father was absent from his life. Stylistically, BUA's subjects are often rendered with elongated limbs or hands, emphasizing the rhythm and musicality of the scene.

=== Select Exhibitions ===
In 2010, Pop International Galleries in New York launched a solo exhibition of BUA's paintings. In 2011, BUA's work was featured in an event at the Los Angeles County Museum of Art. In 2024, BUA exhibited work at the Tucson Museum of Art where he also spoke on a panel about his work, and in 2025 he spoke about his art at the Museum of Graffiti in Miami.

=== NFT and Ripple ===
In 2022, BUA was among the first artists funded by Ripple's $250 million Creator Fund to develop NFT projects. In 2023, BUA launched a collection of NFTs at the South by Southwest festival in Austin. The collection included 1,011 unique NFTs inspired by his work, The MC, and hidden among them were 11 “golden tickets,” offering something additional to collectors.

=== Commercial Art ===
Launching his reputation in the world of commercial art, BUA has designed and illustrated a myriad of products that include skateboards, CD album covers, apparel and advertising campaigns. He has also developed successful visual concepts in the entertainment world, including: the opening sequence of MTV's sketch-comedy television series, The Lyricist Lounge Show (2000–2001), EA Sports video games NBA Street (2001), NFL Street (2004), Slum Village's award-winning music video Tainted and Toyota's Long Beach Grand Prix campaign.

=== Street Art Throwdown ===
In 2015, BUA developed, hosted and was the executive producer for Oxygen Channel's Street Art Throwdown which featured ten up-and-coming graffiti and street artists as they competed in challenges for a $100,000 grand prize. BUA co-hosted the show alongside gallerist Lauren Wagner. Contestants included: Annie Preece, Jenna Morello and Cameron Moberg with Lady Pink, Ron English and Mear One, as guest judges. Criticized by some as watering down graffiti and street art culture, extreme feedback included death threats and BUA had to hire security.

=== U.S. Citizens’ Stamp Advisory Committee ===
In 2014, BUA was appointed by the U.S. Postmaster General to the Citizens’ Stamp Advisory Committee, which recommends subjects for U.S. postage stamps. BUA was a part of the 11 person committee who approved a stamp featuring Mister Rogers in 2017.

=== Speaking ===
BUA taught figure drawing at the University of Southern California for ten years. In 2013, he became the first artist to launch an online program with ArtistWorks, allowing students around the world of varying levels of experience to study his curriculum and interact digitally through video exchange. In 2018, BUA launched an art and art history podcast called Art Attack, where he and art historian co-host Dr. Lizy Dastin debated discussed artists and their work. Free to anyone with interest in the topic, this podcast fits with BUA's desire to make art and information accessible to everyone. Art Attack was included on several sites listing top art podcasts in the space.

== Bibliography ==
- BUA, Justin. The Legends of Hip Hop. HarperCollins, 2011.
- BUA, Justin. The Beat of Urban Art – The Art of Justin Bua. Collins Design, 2007.
- BUA, Justin. Original Influencers. Insight Editions, 2022.

== Awards ==
BUA's art direction for Kareem Abdul-Jabbar’s documentary On the Shoulders of Giants coincided with the film winning the NAACP Image Award for Outstanding Documentary. BUA is cited by the USPS as having accepted both an NAACP Image Award and a Telly Award for his contributions.

== Presence at Auction ==
In 2017, BUA was a featured artist on Artsy benefiting the American Civil Liberties Union.

== See also ==
- List of Fiorello H. LaGuardia High School alumni
- List of people from Brooklyn
- List of street artists
- List of University of Southern California people
