= Moncho 1929 =

Los Angeles-based street and contemporary artist

- Born: New York, NY
- Known for: street art, contemporary art, collaborations
- Movement: contemporary art, street art
- Website: www.moncho1929.com

Moncho 1929 (born Dan Monteavaro ) is a Los Angeles–based street and contemporary artist originally from New York City known for his colorful murals and sociopolitical content. In 2016, he created banners that West Hollywood City Hall displayed on their building and in 2017, he was commissioned by Universal Pictures to paint three murals promoting the film Atomic Blonde starring Charlize Theron.

Recently, Moncho was acquired for the permanent collection of The Figge Art Museum, which is one of the oldest art institutions in the country and is considered the first municipal art gallery in the United States.

== Street Art ==
Growing up in the South Bronx during the 1980s, Moncho 1929 was inspired by the boon in urban art that occurred in Manhattan at that time. The work that he makes today incorporates the graffiti and street art aesthetic he grew up with while integrating more traditional techniques such a silkscreen and representational drawing. The content of his work shares the diversity of his techniques and addresses themes ranging from war to animal poaching to police brutality and celebrity obsession.

Moncho 1929's work has been exhibited in several solo and group shows at galleries including: LAB ART, The Gabba Gallery, Cheryl Hazan Contemporary Art, DTR Modern, Gallery 825, Soho House among others and featured in community-driven outdoor initiatives such as "Animal Alley LA."

A mural Moncho 1929 collaborated on with fellow contemporary artist Karen Bystedt of Andy Warhol's face over his signature color washes was featured on the Google Arts & Culture platform.

=== The City of Glendale's Utility Boxes, 2014 ===
In an effort to make art accessible to viewers who might not have access to a gallery or museum, the Glendale Arts and Culture Commission launched a public art program to beautify the community. Artists, including Moncho 1929, painted 26 electrical boxes throughout the city.

=== Smile South Central, 2015 ===
The "Smile South Central" initiative was founded in an effort to reinvigorate the community, promote local pride and provide an outdoor arts education. Artists, like Moncho 1929, who participated in the project, donated their time and created designs that were appropriate and specific to the community.

=== West Hollywood City Hall Community Plaza, 2016 ===
In 2016, the City Hall Community Plaza opened as a site-specific public art space with installations and murals by Moncho 1929, Ned Kahn, Bronwyn Lundberg, and Kim West, among others. Moncho 1929 and West Hollywood's for city poet Steven Reigns designed a collaborative banner for the center.

=== San Pedro Mural Project, 2017 ===
In 2010, popular San Pedro Greek restaurant Papadakis Taverna closed its doors. Five years later, the building was repurchased and has been undergoing renovation ever since to restore not only the restaurant but also the local community pride. Alongside artist Jason Ostro, Moncho 1929 was asked to paint murals on the exterior of the building in conjunction with the San Pedro Waterfront Arts District.

=== Berkadia Project, 2017 ===
Moncho 1929 was commissioned to paint a large scale mural for the new Washington D.C. offices of Berkadia owned by Warren Buffett and was subsequently collected for the permanent collection.

Google Campus (Playa Vista, California) 2018

In 2018, Moncho was commissioned to paint a mural for Google, Inc Playa Vista Campus in California, adding to their art collection in the historic Howard Hughes Spruce Goose Hangar.

NYC DOT Chinatown, 2019

Commissioned by the NYC Department of Transportation, Moncho painted a 10,000 sq ft mural along historic Doyer St in Chinatown, running the entire length of the very famous NYC landmark.

Audi Field, Washington DC, 2020

In 2019, MLS team DC United commissioned Moncho to paint a 60,000 square foot mural for the newly finished Audi Field Stadium. Finished before opening day, the mural added to the energy and spirit of the city and stadium.

Magic Johnson Park, Willowbrook, California, 2020

In 2020, during the pandemic, Moncho was commissioned by the City of Los Angeles to paint a 50,000 square foot mural for the redesigned and reopening of The Magic Johnson Park in Willowbrook, California.

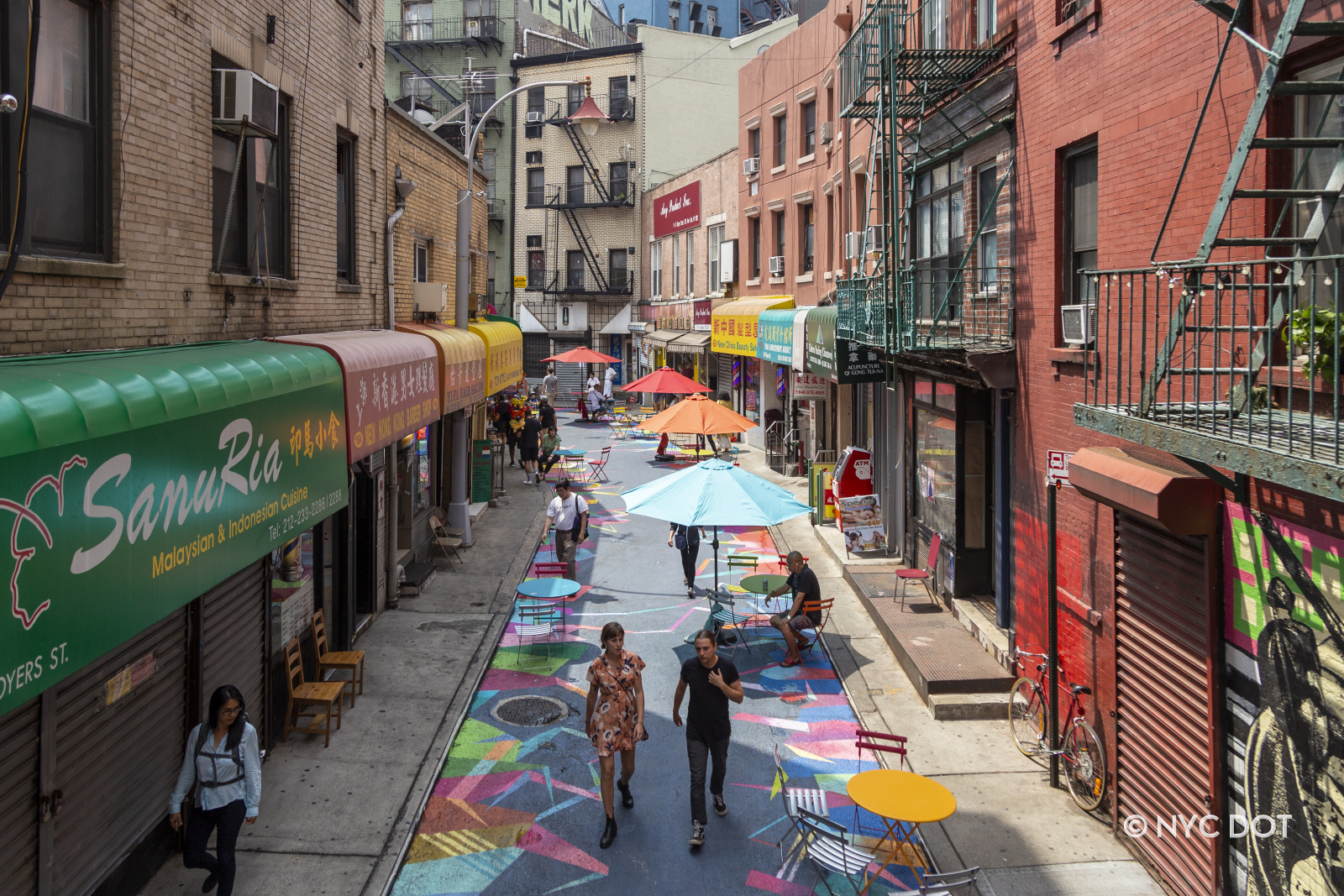
Mural on Historic Doyer street

== Museum Acquisition ==
Moncho 1929 was recently acquired and accepted into the permanent collection of the Figge Art Museum in Davenport, IA

== Presence at Art Fairs and Auction ==
Moncho 1929 was the featured muralist for Saatchi Art's "The Other Art Fair" in Los Angeles and NYC in 2018 - 2019

Moncho 1929 has sold multiple works at auction with IntoAction alongside Hank Willis Thomas, Swoon, Glenn Kaino, Sage Vaughn, Patrick Martinez, Shepard Fairey and many others, and Julien's Auction and in 2017 was a featured artist on Artsy benefiting the American Civil Liberties Union.

Moncho 1929 has work in many private collections such as Soho House alongside Damien Hirst, Edward Ruscha, Harland Miller as well as the collections of Berkadia and Ron Burkle.

Art fairs participated in include Art Houston, Palm Springs Fine Art Fair, SF Fine Art Fair, Hamptons Fine Art Fair among others and in 2017, he had work featured on the main page of Artsy.com for the Art Miami Fair at Art Basel.

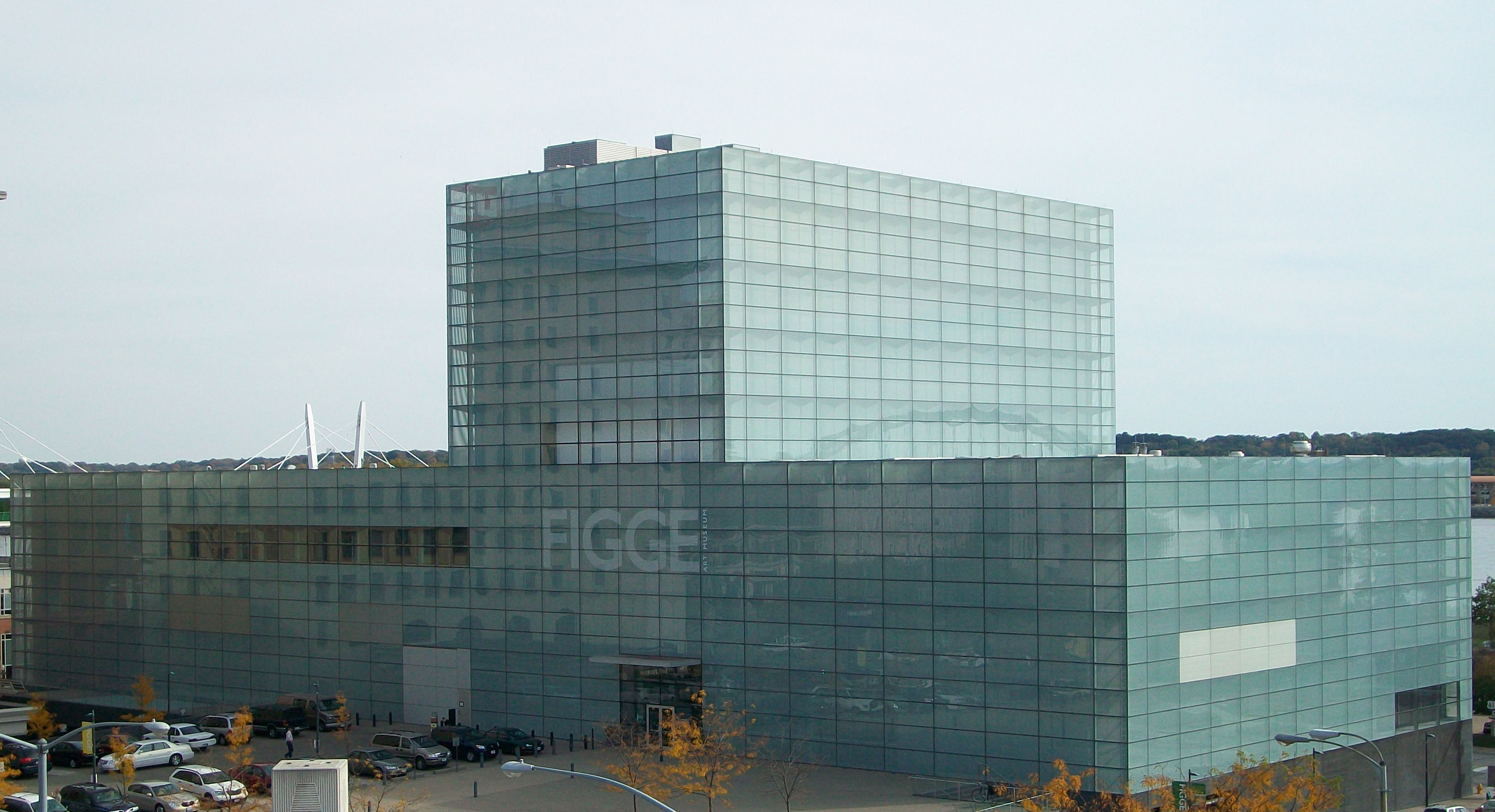
Figge Art Museum

== Commercial Work ==
Porsche (No Small Dreams) 2022

Porsche commissioned Moncho for 3 original works for their "No Small Dreams" campaign.

Universal Pictures ( Atomic Blonde ) 2017

Universal Pictures commissioned Moncho to create an original mural for the feature film "Atomic Blonde " Starring Charlize Theron

Paramount Pictures ( Star Trek Beyond ) 2016

Paramount Pictures commissioned Moncho to create an original mural and limited print for the feature film "Star Trek Beyond "

Invesco 2016

Moncho was commissioned to do a mural by Invesco for a national commercial

New Amsterdam/EJ Gallo 2015

Moncho was commissioned to represent Los Angeles in a national ad campaign for New Amsterdam Vodka
