= Christy Martin (disambiguation) =

Christy Martin is an American former boxer.

Christy Martin may also refer to:

- Christy Martin (footballer)
- Christy Martin, character in Slasher (TV series)

== See also ==
- Christopher Martin (disambiguation)
- Chris Martin (disambiguation)
