= Christian Martínez =

Christian Martínez may refer to:

- Christian Martínez (footballer, born 1979), Mexican football goalkeeper
- Christian Martínez (footballer, born 1983), Chilean football midfielder
- Christian Martínez (Honduran footballer) (born 1990), Honduran football striker
- Christian Martínez (footballer, born 1994), Salvadoran football midfielder
- Christian Martínez (footballer, born 2000), Spanish football forward

== See also ==
- Cristian Martínez (disambiguation)
- Cristhian Martínez (born 1982), Dominican baseball player
