= My Dog Sighs =

British street artist

- Born: Paul Stone
- Known for: Free Art Fridays; reflective eye murals; canman (painted tin cans); "Quiet Little Voices"
- Style: Melancholic, naive, and realistic portraiture
- Movement: Street art, Free Art Movement

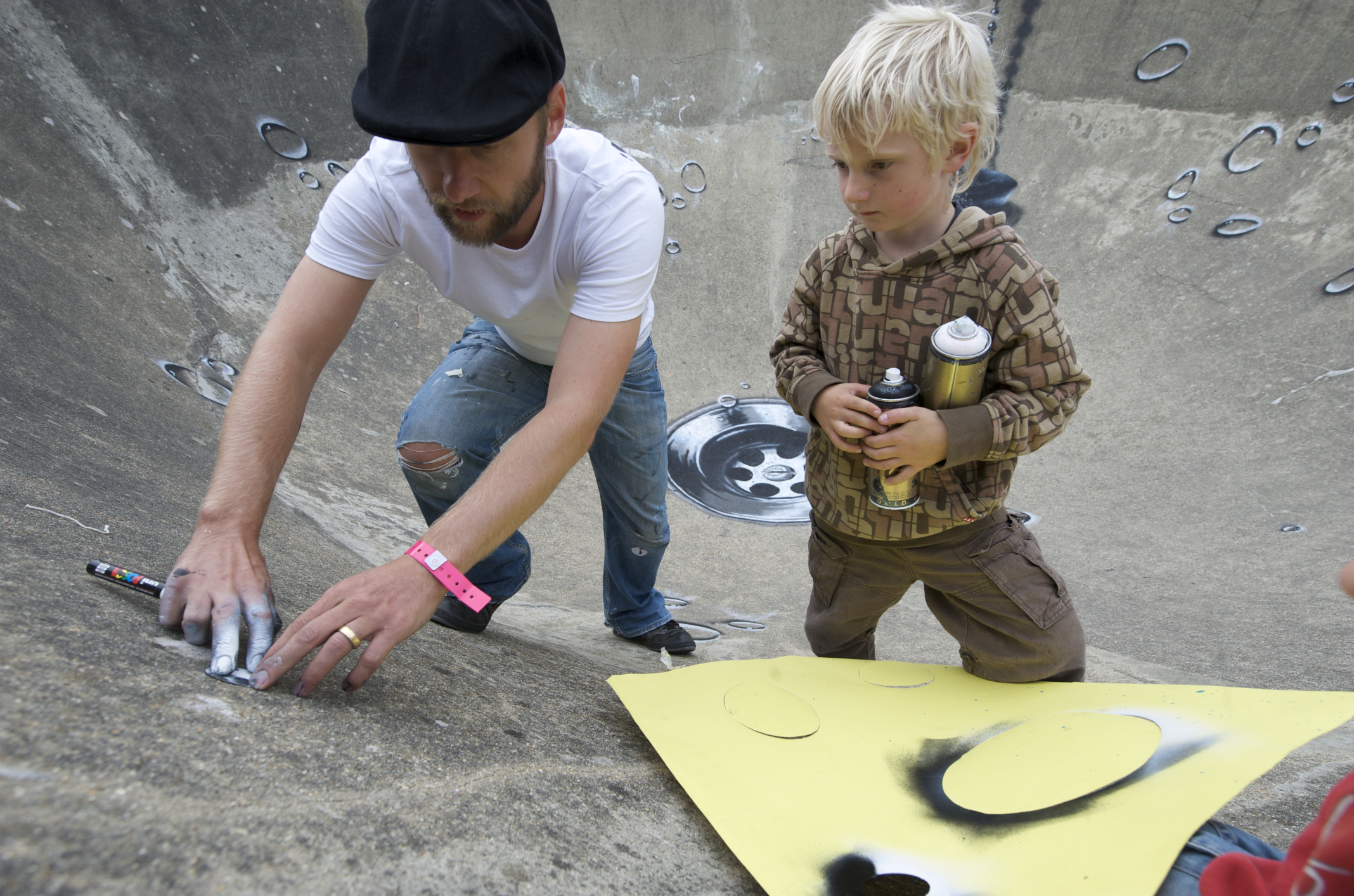
My Dog Sighs (left) working on a street art project at Southsea Skatepark

My Dog Sighs (a pseudonym of Paul Stone) is a street artist based in Portsmouth, UK. He has participated in the Free Art Movement by leaving free art in public to be found by strangers as part of what he calls "Free Art Fridays". His street art has appeared around cities in the UK and internationally, and often features reflections in a realistic human eye, faces painted on discarded tin cans and his series of cartoon like characters including "Quiet Little Voices". While incorporating found materials, his work includes melancholic, and naive He now travels internationally to create murals around the world. He has been awarded an honorary doctorate from the University of Portsmouth and has guest edited The Big Issue Art Edition.

In 2023, My Dog Sighs celebrated the 20th anniversary of his art career by a citywide treasure hunt in Portsmouth with pieces of his artwork totaling £45,000 in value to be found. In 2026 to celebrate Portsmouth's centenary he hid £100,000 of artwork in a city-wide treasure hunt including a £3,500 necklace which was buried on the beach.

== Free Art Fridays ==
Although artistic since school, My Dog Sighs pursued a teaching career as a stable job. In the early 2000s, My Dog Sighs was inspired by the emerging street art scene, including Banksy, to attempt his own work. He began by creating small pieces of art that he would leave in public, sometimes on his commute to his primary school teaching job, to be found by strangers. Clues to the location of artworks are sometimes left on social media to combine treasure hunting with art. My Dog Sighs said he weekly participated in Free Art Fridays for 12 years. The gifted art movement was reinvigorated by My Dog Sighs coining the term "Free Art Fridays".

My Dog Sighs says street art has a special power to engage a wide audience: "The power of art is that it just makes people look at the world in a slightly different way... As a street artist, what I find really powerful is the idea that it’s not just people looking for art that are seeing it. Every demographic walks down the street and can stumble across a piece of street art."

Free Art Friday was featured on the BBC's The Culture Show in Feb 2012. This led to galleries selling his work and finding it was commercially successful.

== Inside ==
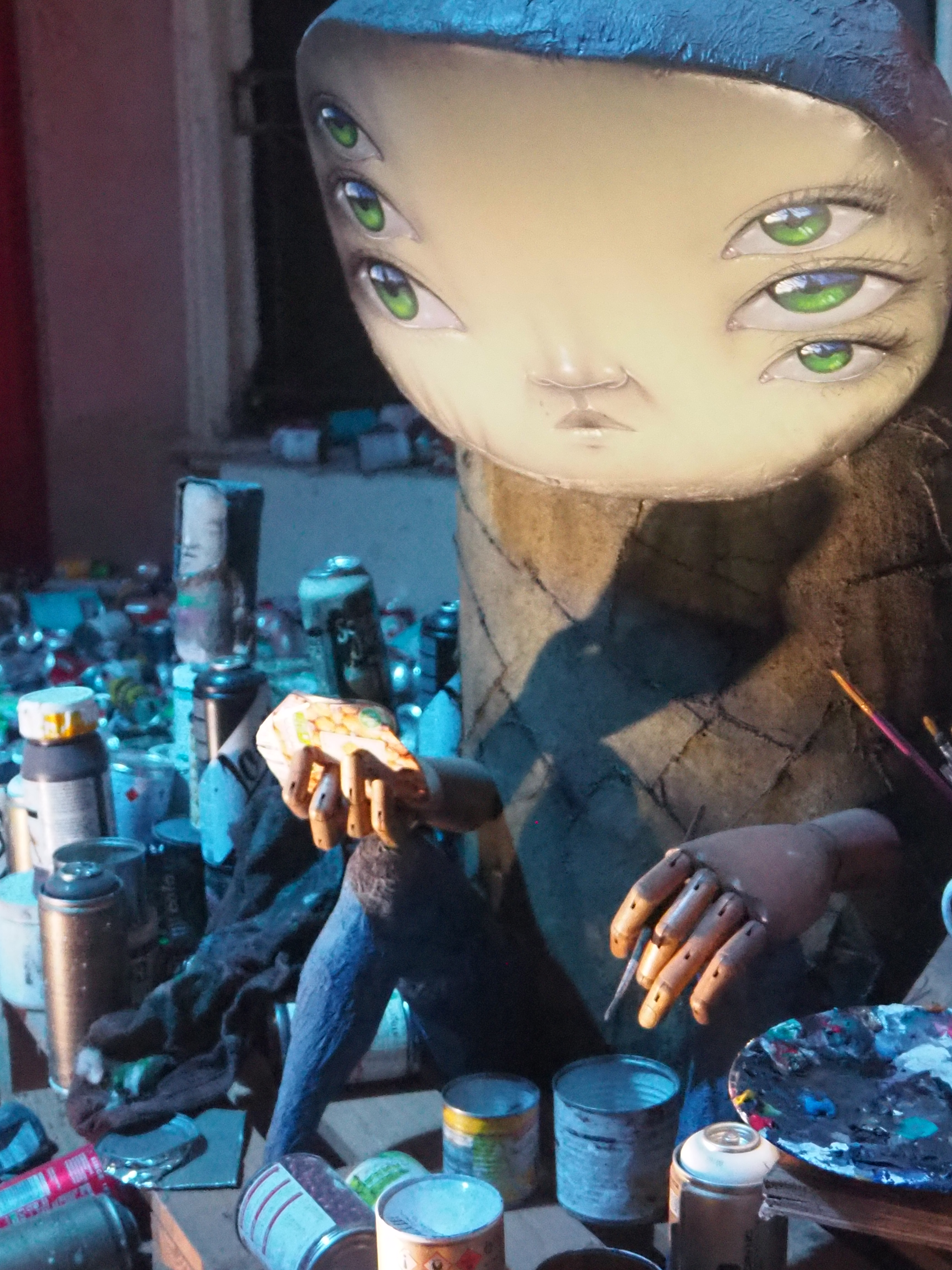
Part of the "Inside" exhibition

Starting in late 2019, My Dog Sighs began transforming the interior of the former Kimbells nightclub and casino in Southsea into an exhibition "Inside". Originally planned to take a few months, this project became a process working in secret through the COVID-19 pandemic and marked his first foray into sculpture. The effort to bring the exhibition to fruition was difficult and isolating, with My Dog Sighs saying "It nearly physically and mentally broke me. It was amazing, but it was definitely biting off more than I could chew." The exhibition opened in July 2021 for two weeks and sold 10,000 tickets. The creation process was recorded as a documentary "We Shelter Here Sometimes".

== Look Up Portsmouth ==
My Dog Sighs had the idea for a citywide street art festival in Portsmouth. This became Look Up Portsmouth featuring street artists Phlegm, Hera, Kashink, Inkie and James Reka, and has run annually since 2023. Thanks in part to My Dog Sighs, Portsmouth boasts the highest density of street art of any city in the UK.
