= DabsMyla =

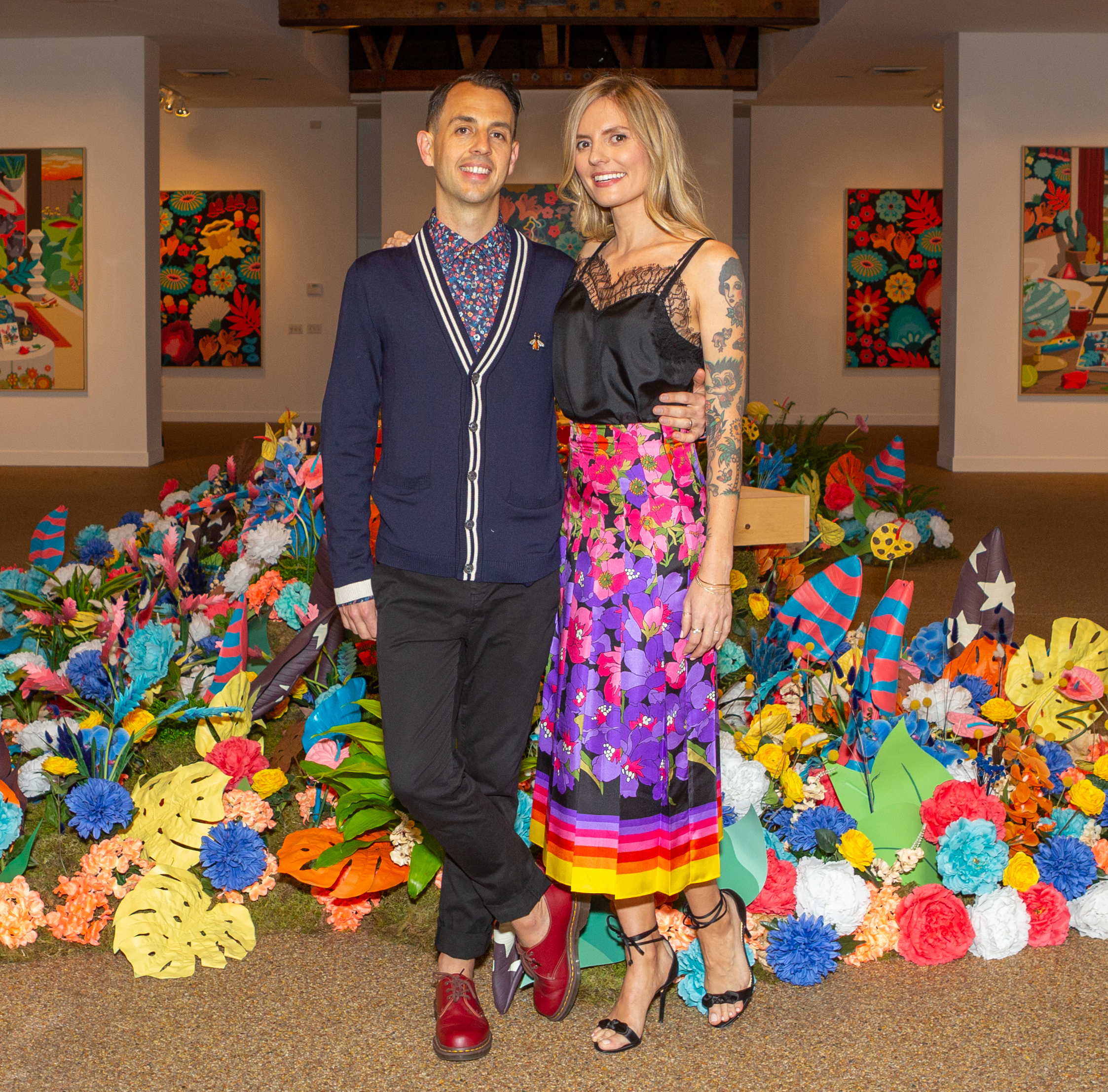
DabsMyla

DabsMyla is the collaborative name of Australian-born visual artists, Darren "Dabs" Mate and Emmelene "Myla" Mate. DabsMyla's work is characterized by large-scale pop-art mural paintings and illustrations. Their art installations have been showcased in Rio de Janeiro, London, Detroit, Norway, Tahiti, and Los Angeles.

== Career ==
The pair met in 2007 while studying illustration at an art school in Melbourne. They began working together under the name "DabsMyla" before relocating to Los Angeles in 2009.

DabsMyla creates interactive installations featuring paintings inspired by graffiti, mid-century illustration, and the Golden Age of American animation. In 2012, they created a custom mural for Sanrio’s Hello Kitty, Hello Art! event. In 2014, they created a large-scale installation for the first-ever Hello Kitty Con at the Museum of Contemporary Art, Los Angeles. They also designed and created the set for the 2015 MTV Movie Awards, as well as the event’s logo and award statuette.

In 2015, DabsMyla reshaped a 4,000-square-foot Spanish revival-style building in Los Angeles into the installation "Before and Further" in collaboration with Modernica, the American Modernism furniture brand.

In early 2016, DabsMyla painted colorful murals covering the outside of Bob Baker’s Marionette Theatre in Little Manila.

Three blocks of DabsMyla's pop-up artwork decorated the Santa Monica Promenade with a "whimsical cast" of holiday characters and interactive installations in December 2017.

In 2018, the exhibition Beyond the Streets featured an installation by DabsMyla that included a wall of 3,000 paper flowers and three paintings.

Later in 2018, their "Things That Can't Be Seen" exhibition restyled the former Taschen Gallery in Beverly Grove with a mural on the outside and large-scale original paintings and installations inside. The work featured autobiographical elements and California-inspired imagery throughout. Floral accents and design were provided by Birch & Bone.

== List of Selected Exhibitions ==
- In Bloom: Flowers in Contemporary Art, Forest Lawn Museum, CA (2025-2026)
- Things That Can't Be Seen, Los Angeles, CA (2018)
- Beyond the Streets, Los Angeles, CA (2018)
- MTV Movie Awards, Los Angeles, CA (2015)
- Before and Further, Modernica, Vernon, CA (2015)
- Hello Kitty Convention, MOCA Geffen Contemporary, Los Angeles (2014)
- Hello Kitty, Hello Art, Openhouse Gallery, New York (2014)
- 20 Years Under the Influence of Juxtapoz, Los Angeles Municipal Art Gallery at Barnsdall Park (2015)
- Cruel Summer, Jonathan LeVine Gallery, New York (2014)
- Pow! Wow!, Honolulu Museum of Art, Hawaii (2014)
- San Francisco is For Lovers – White Walls Gallery, San Francisco, CA (2013)
- All Good Things – Metro Gallery, Melbourne, Australia (2013)
- Break Night Lovers – Known Gallery, Los Angeles, CA (2012)
- Marvelous Expeditions: DABS MYLA and FRIENDS – Thinkspace Gallery, Los Angeles, CA (2012)
- Double Diamond – M Modern Gallery, Palm Springs, CA (2011)
- Young & Free – White Walls Gallery, San Francisco, CA (2011)
- The Best Of Times – Thinkspace Gallery, Los Angeles, CA (2011)
