= Gifted art =

Art distributed without cost

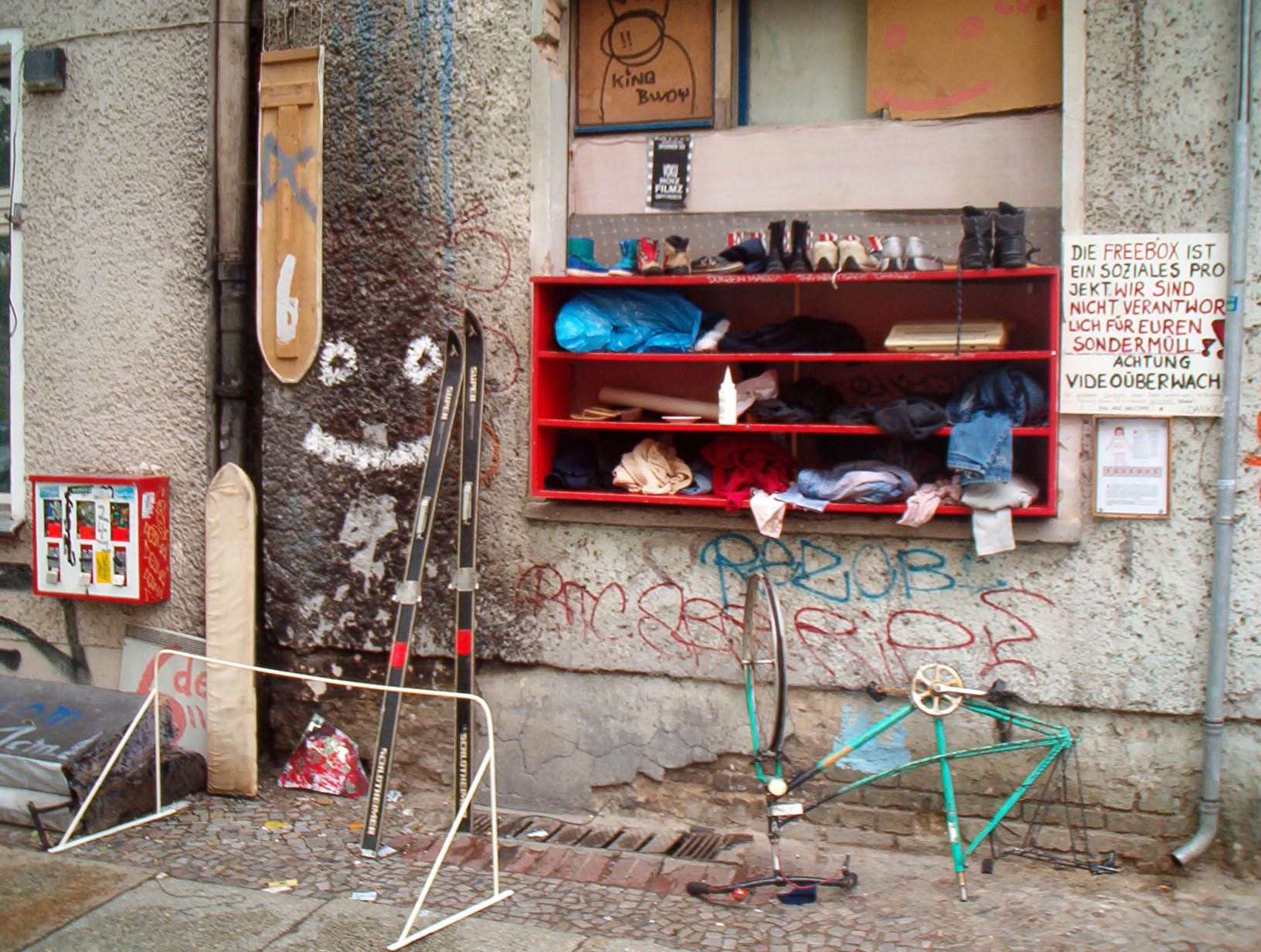
A Freebox in Berlin, Germany 2005, serving as a distribution center for free donated materials

Gifted art (or free art) is any form or piece of art that is given freely, whether to a city, a group of people, a community or an individual. It refers to any art that is distributed at no direct cost. It is a form of conceptual art. It comes from a belief that art should be available for all people to enjoy, whether rich or poor, university graduate or junior high dropout. Since Gifted Art is an expressive form of art - an idea, it encompasses virtually all forms of art: movies, literature, music recordings, sculpture, painting, graffiti, digital art, street performances, performance art, sticker art, comics, coffeehouse poetry and Internet-distributed art etc.

== Short History ==
Gifted Art has a long history in the arts. Many artists have been known to give art freely to each other, in an effort to pass along ideas, etc. Picasso and many of his contemporaries were fond of this. Duchamp was one of the first modern day artists to Gift to the public with his piece, Fountain, for an art show in 1917. He gave the piece under the name of "R. Mutt," presumably to hide his identity as the artist. He actually had to pay $7 to have the piece exhibited in the show, and never intended on making any money from it. He gave it freely for all to see and to push forward the Dada movement. In the 1950s, Ray Johnson started doing Mail art. He spread the idea to many other artists and it still occurs today. In 2002, a 6 ft X 53 ft mural by Roy Lichtenstein was installed in the Times Square Subway Station in New York City. It was given as a gift by the artist to all New Yorkers. In recent years, Gifted Art has primarily been embraced by graffiti and urban artists, in particular the British artist My Dog Sighs is recognised as one of the pioneers. Many graffiti artists consider the work they do to be art for the public. Banksy writes in his books that he believes art is more important and more enjoyable when it is out on the street where people can view it in their everyday lives than when it hangs in a museum.

== See also ==
- Graffiti
- Urban culture
- Art graffiti
- Street Art
- Internet art
- Free Art license
- Free culture movement
- Free content
