= Thrashbird =

- Known for: graffiti, street art
- Movement: graffiti, street art

Thrashbird is a Los Angeles–based street artist of unverified identity known for his billboard takeovers, stencils and wheatpastes. His satirical street art and subversive content combine humor with social observations to highlight issues of media obsession, selfie culture and reliance on technology. In 2016, he was listed on KCRW's radio broadcast as being one of the most exciting contemporary street artists to watch.

== Urban projects and the clone ==
Thrashbird is known for putting his work in urban areas where his message can reach a large target audience. The artist became known for his image of the texting clone, a silhouette of a slender figure in a hoodie, glued to his phone and hunched to read the screen. When Blackberry Phones were popular, Thrashbird said that he noticed his friends were more interested in their phones than in the world around them. When the iPhone was released, according to Thrashbird this trend got worse, inspiring him to respond through his art.

== Desert projects ==
More recently, Thrashbird has expanded his city practice to the desert, incorporating the natural landscape and its abandoned buildings.

== Public activism and auctions ==
Awareness and activism are central themes in Thrashbird's work and the artist has presented in several symposia to talk about them. In 2016 he was a featured guest at the LA Art Show speaking on a panel on the Commercialization of Street Art. His work has been included in street art auctions, including the 2016 Street Art and Contemporary Art sale at Julien's Auctions alongside works by Banksy, Shepard Fairey and Mr. Brainwash.
