= Bisco Smith =

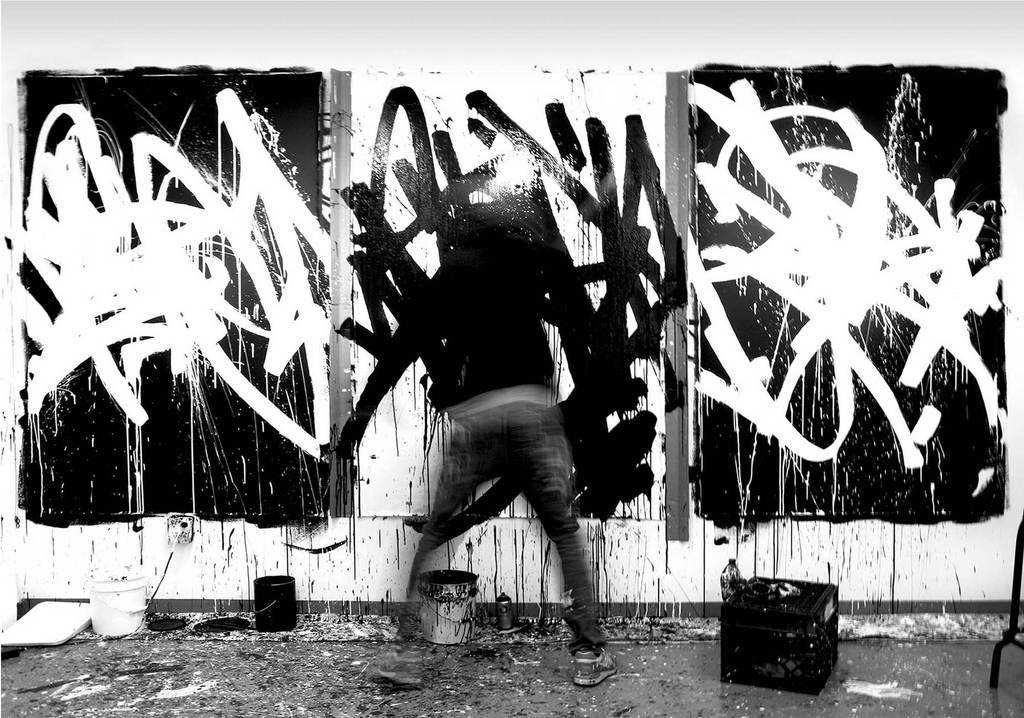
- Born: July 22, 1980 (age 45)
- Education: Pratt Institute, Brooklyn
- Occupation: Visual artist
- Known for: Graffiti, street art, Abstract Expressionism
- Website: biscosmith.com

Bisco Smith is an American contemporary artist with roots in music and graffiti. Smith works in a variety of formats, including canvas and large outdoor murals, and is recognized for his lyrical approach to deconstructed expressionism characterized by gestural marks and abstracted text that embody the energy of a moment. Using music as his muse, he approaches each canvas as unique opportunity to channel the expression of his inspiration by stripping his compositions to their fundamental essence of motion and rhythm. Smoth's works, painted predominantly in black and white, embody the creative spontaneity that exists at the intersection of music and paint.

Smith has exhibited art, performed music, painted murals, and partnered with creative brands and live events worldwide such as Nike, Turner, SLS South Beach, Adidas, and Coach New York. With a resume of solo and group exhibitions in New York, Los Angeles, Tokyo, Miami, Berlin, Seattle, and Hong Kong, Smith's works are sought after by collectors and art enthusiasts worldwide. Smith is a profiled artist in The Art of Writing Your Name: Urban Calligraphy and Beyond. In 2018, Smith became an ambassador of Calligraffiti.

== Early life ==
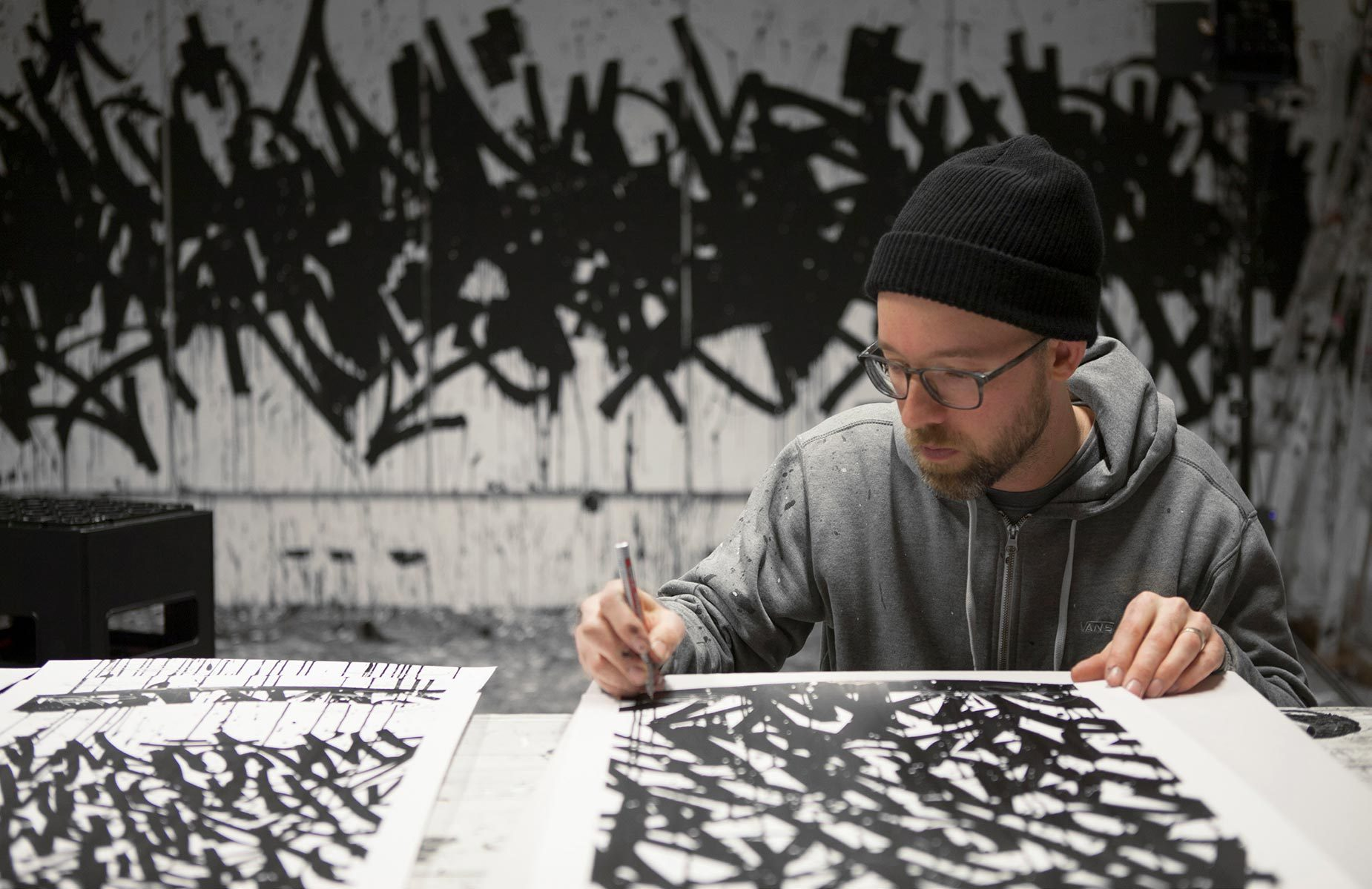

=== Graffiti ===
Between 1993 and 2013, Smith wrote graffiti and is included in such books as Broken Windows Graffiti NYC and Burning New York by James and Karla Murray, Fresh Paint NYC by Billy Schon, and The Rise of Legal Graffiti in New York and Beyond (2017) written by Ronald Kramer, where the artist's views on ethics within the practice are quoted.

=== Music ===
Smith entered into the music and disc-jockey world as another creative outlet that aligned with his graffiti—the more he wrote graffiti, the more he was inspired to freestyle rap and the more he rapped the more motivated he was to write more graffiti. In addition to writing and performing his own music, Smith designed album covers and art directed projects for Definitive Jux, Ninja Tune, and Eastern Conference Records.

=== Visual art ===
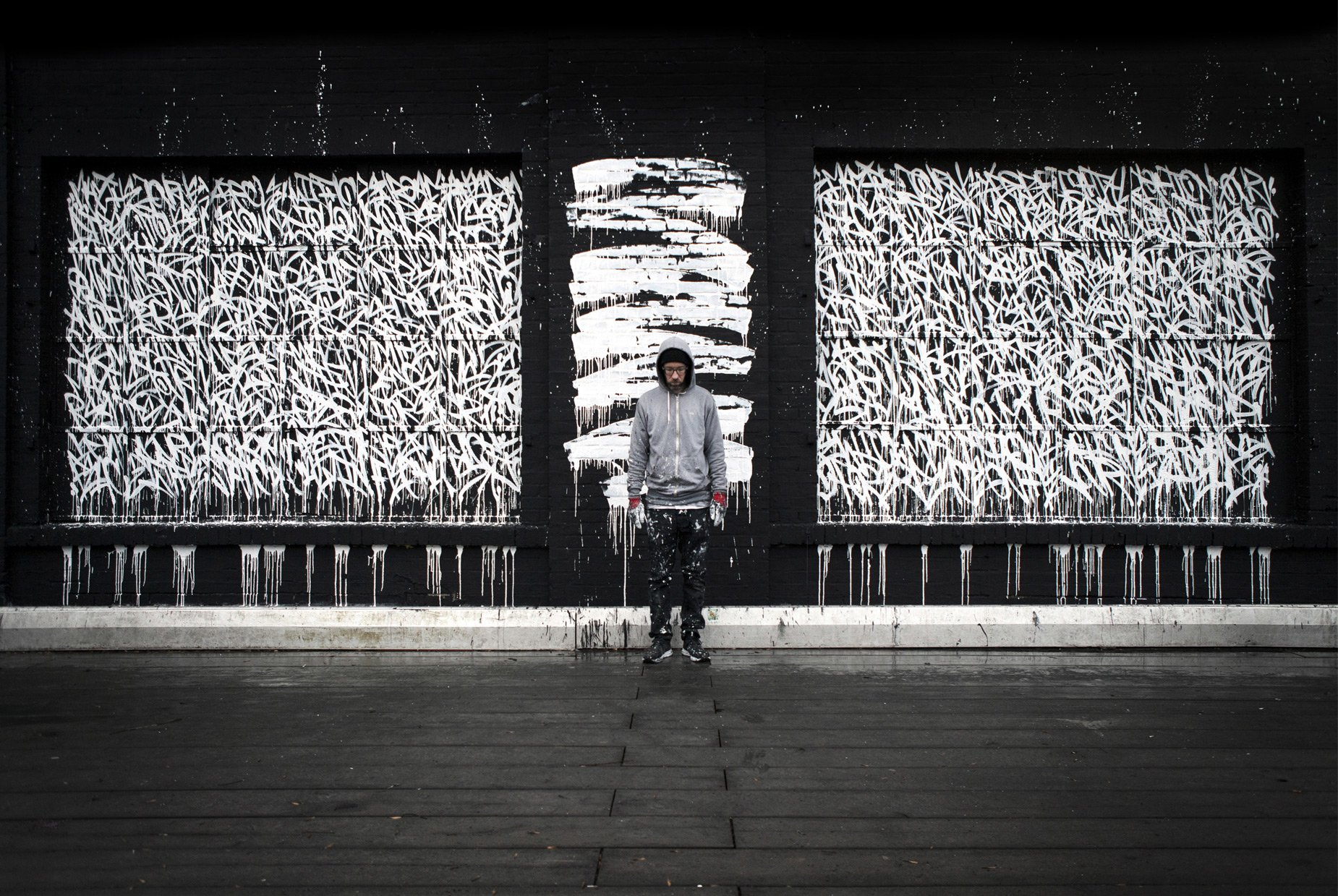

Drawing on his background painting in the streets, Smith often composes his works using materials like household paint, rollers, spray paint, and wheat paste. Although his work is often a collection of words, he abstracts the words to such a degree that they become nearly impossible to read, encouraging viewers to appreciate the design and organically absorb the energy. Smith utilizes his understanding of space from his early years as a graffiti writer, reimagining the execution of abstract expressionist painting through his unique contemporary lens.

In 2016, a reviewer of Smith's exhibition at CAVE Gallery in Venice, Los Angeles said of the artist's process: "Splattered with syncopated swirls, the grace of the letter, drizzles or jabs of paint, the mystery of learning how to trust the process is spelled out, moment by moment." In addition to process, positive intention is integral to Smith's art. His aim is to blend his experiences in life with the experience being in the moment to create work that inspires hope for the future.

== Discography ==
- Eyes Open - Mixtape (2003)
- The Basics - EP (2005)
- The Stay Up Project - Mixtape (2007)
- When Electric Night Falls - LP (2008)
- The Strange Love Project - Mixtape (2009)
- The Broadcast - LP (2010)
- Broadcast Radio - Mixtape (2011)
- The Freeze Tag - EP (2011)
- Thirty Three / Forty Five - Mixtape (2012)
- Jackson P - EP (2012),
- Atlantic Sky - LP (2013),
- Castles in the Sky - EP (2014),
