= Chris Martin (boxing trainer) =

New Zealand boxing trainer (1963/1964–2023)

- Born: Christopher Bruce Martin; 23 September 1964; Napier, New Zealand
- Died: 21 August 2023 (aged 58); Auckland, New Zealand
- Burial place: Waikumete Cemetery
- Occupations: Boxing manager and trainer

Christopher Bruce Martin (23 September 1964 – 21 August 2023) was a New Zealand boxing manager and trainer. He trained many boxers including two of David Tua's fights in 2011, Joseph Parker's debut and first fight in Australia, Mea Motu during her amateur career, Geovana Peres for her two world title fights in 2019, Michelle Preston for her world title fight in 2012, and Daniella Smith.

== Training amateur boxers ==
=== Soulan Pownceby ===
In 1995, Martin was the personal trainer of Olympic boxer Soulan Pownceby when Pownceby got convicted for manslaughter.

=== Siona Fernandes ===
In 2012, Martin's boxer Siona Fernandes went to The London 2012 Summer Olympics, competing in the flyweight division. When Fernandes started boxing under Martin, in their first year together, Fernandes captured the New Zealand National Amateur Boxing Championships and Most Scientific boxing award at the Championships.

=== Mea Motu ===
In 2015, Martin coached a team of amateur boxers to take to the New Zealand Championships. One of the people on the team was Mea Motu.

== David Tua ==
In 2011, Martin started training David Tua in Tua's 2011 comeback after Tua's draw against Monte Barrett in 2010. Martin's first fight with Tua was against Demetrice King. Martin described King as a big man. Tua won the fight by unanimous decision. Roger Bloodworth who trained Tua for his Shane Cameron fight, was considered an option leading into the rematch against Monte Barrett. Seven weeks before Tuas fight against Barrett rematch, Martin still had not heard from Tua and Tua had still not made his decision on who his trainer will be. However, in the end Martin trained Tua for his rematch against Monte Barrett which took place in New Zealand. Martin was part of the press conference leading into the fight against Barrett. Martin stated he worked on Tua Work rate going into the Barrett fight during training. Tua lost the fight against Barrett. Martin refused to work with Tua after that fight after not being paid for his services. Martin described the loss for Tua against Barrett was down to Tua's battles outside the ring.

== Main stable ==
=== Steven Heremaia ===
Martin was the trainer for Steven Heremaia since Heremaia's amateur boxing career. Martin described Heremaia as a "mini-Tyson". Martin would continue to train Heremaia throughout his professional career. One of the fights Martin cornered Heremaia for was his first fight in Fiji against Zulfikar Joy Ali. In February 2010 when Heremaia at the time had the record of 14–3, Martin believed 2 out of 3 of Heremaia losses were due to poor judging. This comes after Heremaia suffered another loss due to poor judging.

=== Nikolas Charalampous ===
Martin was one of Charalampous' trainers during his professional boxing career. The other trainer being Cleve Langdon.

=== The Tai family ===
Martin trained multiple members of the Tai family including Daniel, Jordan, Joshua and Monica.

Martin trained Jordan Tai when he defeated unbeaten Joe Blackborn for the New Zealand title in the first round.

In 2021, Monica Tai under Chris Martin was expected to return to the ring as a pro. However, the return did not happen in the end due to the covid pandemic.

=== Marcus Heywood ===
Marcus Heywood was one of Martin's professional boxers that he trained. Heywood opinion training with Martin is "Bloody awesome, best coach in New Zealand". Heywoods Farther shares the same opinion stating "he is extremely good".

=== Other boxers ===
In 2012, Martin trained Clarence Tillman for his fight against Sonny Bill Williams for the New Zealand title.

In 2014, Martin trained William Quarrie, one of his well known fights was against Hemi Ahio at the Super 8 Boxing Tournament undercard.

== Women boxers ==
=== Michelle Preston ===
In 2012, Preston fought for her first World boxing title fight in Argentina. Preston turned to Martin to improve her hand work.

=== Smith family ===
Martin trained Daniella Smith during her career. In 2014, Martin would start training Smith's daughter Talia.

=== Geovana Peres ===
Martin was one of the key components for Geovana Peres' WBO World Light Heavyweight title win and successful defence in 2019.

== Train Joseph Parker and his opponents ==
=== Joseph Parker pro debut ===
On Joseph Parkers professional boxing debut, Martin trained and cornered Parker when he fought Dean Garmonsway on 5 July 2012.

=== Afa Tatupu ===
Martin trained Tatupu for his fight against Joseph Parker in 2013. Martin trained Tatupu full time, training twice a day leading into this fight.

=== Brian Minto ===
In 2014, Martin trained Brian Minto in his fight against Joseph Parker. Minto trained with Martin at Auckland's Boxing Alley Gym. Leading into the fight, Minto broke his nose. Minto lost the fight by stoppage.

=== Cornering Joseph Parker ===
In 2023, Parker was cornered by Martin in Parker's first fight in Australia against Faiga Opelu.

== Celebrity training ==
Martin was regular requested by boxers and celebrities to train them while in New Zealand. One example of this is Jimmy Spithill. Another was Shortland Street Actor Bree Peters.

== Death ==
On 21 August 2023, Martin died suddenly of a heart attack, at the age of 59.

== Awards ==
- Joe Thwaites Shield (2003)
