= Annie Preece =

American visual artist (born 1981)

Annie Preece ("Love Annie")
- Born: Anne Marie Preece; February 23, 1981 (age 45); Burlingame, California
- Known for: Painting, reality television
- Movement: Pop art, street art
- Website: anniepreece.com

Annie Preece (born February 23, 1981), also known as "Love Annie", is an American visual artist, public speaker and comedian who lives and works in Los Angeles, California.

== Early life ==
Preece was born in Burlingame, California to a family of artists. During her teen years she friended and was mentored by several graffiti artists, becoming one of the few recognized female street artists in San Francisco. By age 27 she (temporarily) put down the spray can and moved to a paintbrush on canvas.

Preece has struggled with heroin addiction for over 20 years. Her battle was partially documented on Season 1 of the reality series Addicted - Annie & Michael on the TLC network in 2010. She is now living in recovery.

== Career ==
Preece's career started with showings at downtown art walks and group shows, painted shoes for Project Canvas with other artists, and volunteering many hours telling her story of addiction, recovery and passion for art with at-risk youth.

In 2012 she again picked up the spray can and created a humorous piece on a Melrose and Fairfax wall, and again with a mural that drew complaints from the L.A. City Council for its depiction of sex organs.

Her first solo show was in 2013 at Space 1520 in Hollywood. She was asked to be the first female artist to paint a mural on the Roxy Theater in West Hollywood. Notable collaboration include contributing to painting a farewell to the Key Club on Sunset Strip, and work for the final Los Angeles X-Games at Staples Center in 2013. In 2014 Preece had a second solo show at Lab Art Gallery entitled “Love Annie”. Over 2,000 people attended opening night making it one of the largest art openings that year.

In 2015 she competed in the first street art reality show, the Oxygen Network's Street Art Throwdown.

Preece signs her works "Love Annie" or "xo, Annie". Preece is showing her work at LAB ART Los Angeles and LAB ART Dallas and is working on several projects with artist Justin Bua and his management team.
