= Christopher H. Martin =

American artist

Christopher H. Martin (born 1969) is an American artist working with paintings on acrylic and canvas mediums. A self-taught artist, he is known for his signature technique of painting in reverse, using acrylic paint on a clear sheet of acrylic. Martin modernizes the 14th century technique of "Verre Églomisé" to layer acrylic paint on the reverse side of his acrylic canvas in creating his original pieces. In 2006 Martin began working on his third medium, Metallic Prints. Martin has created twenty-two Metallic Print series, totaling two hundred and fifty-one photographs.

Born in Fort Lauderdale, Florida and raised in Orlando, Florida, Martin started his career in the financial retirement industry and quickly realized that his passion was art and creating art. Martin began painting in 1994 in Dallas, Texas where he worked and lived at his studio in Uptown. Over the years, as his career evolved, he has had five different studio/gallery locations in Dallas. Martin then partnered with another gallery owner in Los Angeles in opening The Martin Lozano Gallery. He opened Christopher Martin Gallery in Aspen, Colorado in November 2010. In 2016, Martin opened a third location in Santa Fe, New Mexico on the city's famed Canyon Road. Martin currently has his galleries in Dallas, Santa Fe and Aspen, along with ongoing exhibitions in galleries in Houston and San Francisco.

In 2010, D Magazine recognized Christopher Martin "for [his] power and grace in all settings social."

Christopher Martin currently resides and creates in Aspen, Colorado.

== Commissions and exhibits ==
In November 2012, Martin completed the commission, "Velocity", a 120-foot by five-foot painting located in the lounge of the Circuit of the Americas Formula One track in Austin, Texas."

In April of 2009, Equinox of Dallas, Texas commissioned Martin to create a collection of 30 circular acrylic on acrylic pieces for their sixty-by-twenty-foot entry wall. In March of 2010 The Ritz Carlton of Dove Mountain commissioned Martin to create an array of 24 acrylic discs for their grand entry way. The discs are installed above the entrance.

In October 2011, the Omni Hotel in downtown Dallas, Texas commissioned Martin to create two twelve-foot by eight-foot paintings. The pieces now hang on either side of the entrance to the Grand Ballroom on the third floor.

In May 2013 he exhibited in Laguna Art Museum's Palate to Palette, the 4th Annual Art Aspen, and Unique Dialogue.

Most recently, Martin exhibited in the Venice Biennale collateral exhibition, "Personal Structures – Time, Space and Existence". He also participated in Scope Basel in Switzerland in June 2013, and was featured in a group show in Paris that opened in November 2013 at Galleie Mondapart.

The McLoughlin Gallery: Organic Fusion - Christopher H. Martin.

== Projects ==
Martin also created a series of paintings by adhering 9-11 newspaper headlines to canvas, then painting the U.S. flag over them. Proceeds from the sale of the series were donated to the American Red Cross. Former President George Bush Sr. was given one of Chris' 9-11 flags as the recipient of the Joseph Prize for Human Rights in 2002.
