= LA Art Show =

Coordinates: 34.040164°N 118.269692°W

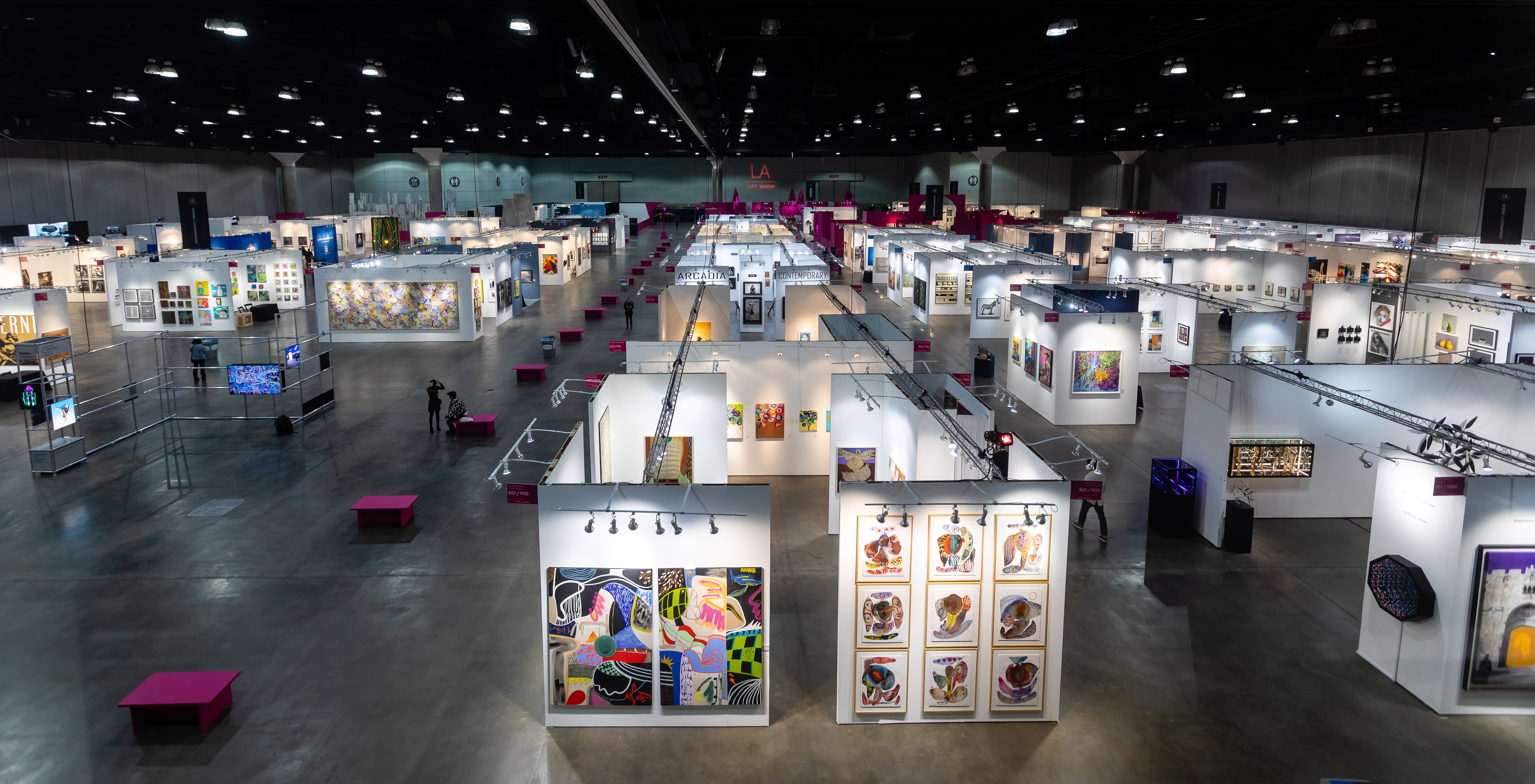
The 2022 LA Art Show

The LA Art Show (Los Angeles Art Show) is an international encyclopedic art exhibition which was originally conceived by the Fine Art Dealers Association (FADA). The show annually takes place in Los Angeles, typically in January/February, and is now a seminal part of Los Angeles Arts Month. It is the largest and most comprehensive contemporary art fair on the West Coast.

The LA Art Show began in 1995, at the Pasadena Convention Center, Pasadena, CA; then moved to the John Wooden Center on the campus of UCLA; then on to Santa Monica's Barker Hangar before making its final home at the Los Angeles Convention Center in 2009.

In 2012, the show was purchased by the Palm Beach Show Group and was managed by KR Martindale Show Management until 2019/2020.

In 2020, Kassandra Voyagis stepped up to assume management and leadership as Producer-Director of the show. Navigating the pandemic, the show was rescheduled the following year, and returned as an in-person show in July 2021. Los Angeles Mayor Eric Garcetti attended the opening and presented the show with a Certificate of Recognition from the City of Los Angeles for the many contributions LA Art Show has made over the years.

The show has since returned to its original schedule with the 2022 edition in January at the LA Convention Center.

== 2009 - 2022 ==
In 2009, the LA Art Show moved to the Los Angeles Convention Center, allowing it to expand both its exhibitor base and floor space --- now covering almost 150,000 square feet (14,000 m^{2}). The show attracts art galleries within the United States, and exhibitors from over 20 countries around the world.

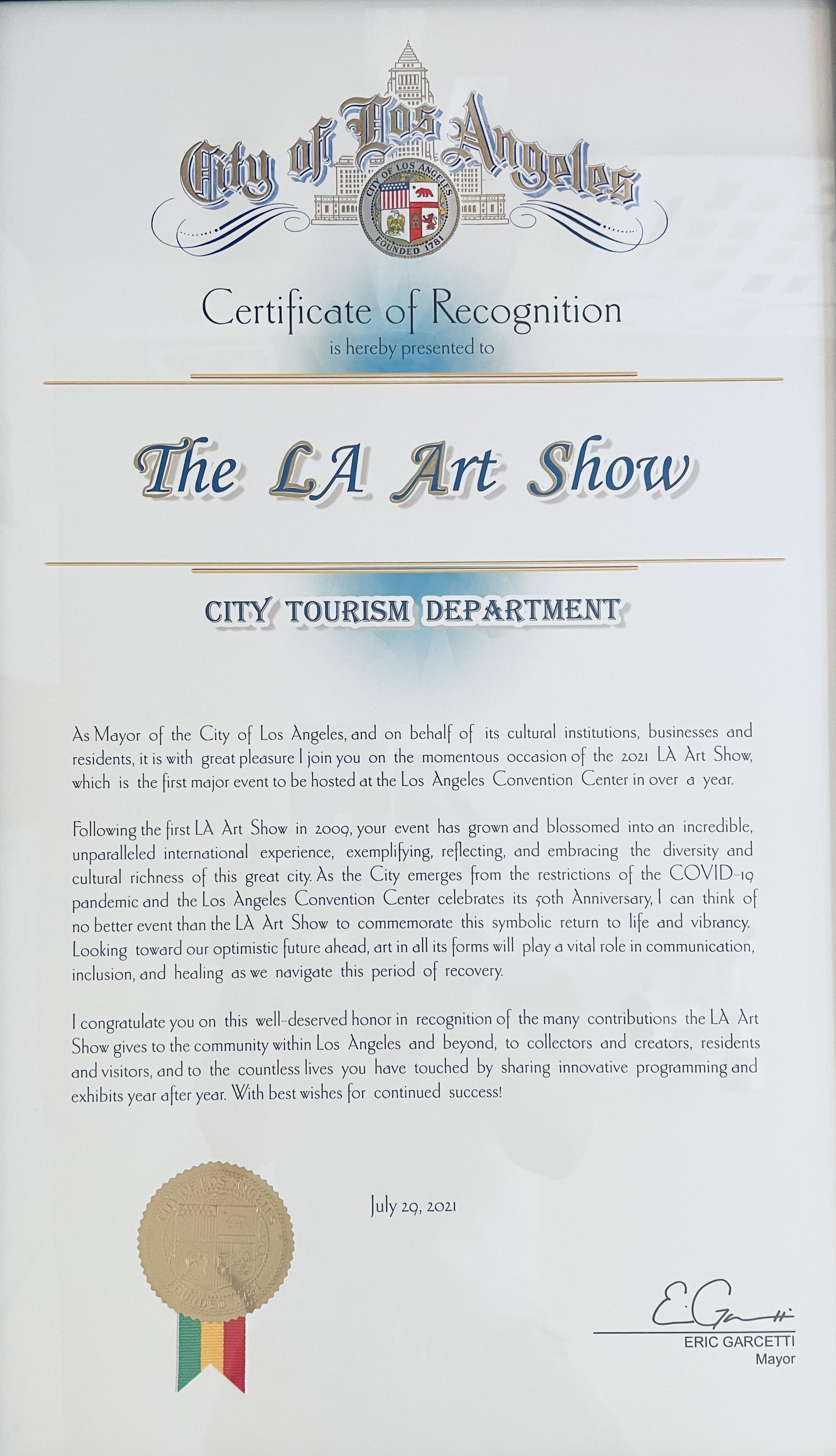
Certificate Of Recognition from the City of Los Angeles
