= Barack Obama "Joker" poster =

Digitally manipulated image of former United States President Barack Obama

US president Barack Obama depicted as the Joker, a comic book supervillain, based on the portrayal by Heath Ledger in The Dark Knight

The Barack Obama "Joker" poster is a manipulated image of Barack Obama, then president of the United States, used by some critics of the Obama administration. The image was created by Firas Alkhateeb in January 2009, and portrays Obama as DC comic book supervillain the Joker, based on the portrayal by Heath Ledger in The Dark Knight (2008). Alkhateeb has said the image was not intended to make a political statement. He uploaded the image to the photo-sharing website Flickr, from where it was downloaded by an unknown individual who added the caption "socialism". It was described in 2009 by The Guardian as the "American right's first successful use of street art".

== Origin ==
The first known use of Obama's image being "Jokerified" was published on Myspace by a user listed as Ross Brummet in August 2008. The image was of a smiling Barack Obama, his face painted over with Joker-style makeup, and the quote "The U.S. deserves a better class of war criminal, and I'm going to give it to them." A second instance, and the first to receive media coverage, occurred at a rally for vice presidential candidate Joe Biden at Florida State University on November 2, 2008. Two members of the FSU College Republicans created the poster from an Obama "Hope" poster they had purchased from the school's College Democrats club, and used it to demonstrate outside the Biden event. This design featured the caption "Why So Socialist?", a parody of The Dark Knight's "Why So Serious" tagline. The students dismissed criticism of the poster, explaining that it was simply a pop culture reference designed to "get the attention of a college audience".

The version of the image that was eventually popularized was created by Firas Alkhateeb, a 20-year-old student at the University of Illinois at Chicago. He digitally manipulated the Obama photograph from his October 2006 Time magazine cover, using Adobe Photoshop. His version did not contain the "socialism" label. Alkhateeb was influenced by artist Shepard Fairey, designer of the Obama "Hope" poster, and wanted to practice a "Jokerize" technique he learned in class. He digitally added the Joker face paint over the Obama image and uploaded it to Flickr on January 18, 2009. Alkhateeb is said to have had no ill-will towards Obama, but was simply bored.

== Reaction ==
=== Media coverage ===
The image went largely unnoticed until an unknown person began placing posters of the image, with the added label "socialism," throughout downtown Los Angeles. In April 2009, Bedlam magazine became the first media outlet to report on Obama "Joker" signs being spotted in Los Angeles. During the summer months, Obama "Joker" posters were distributed in Florida, Hawaii, and Minnesota. In August 2009, the posters became a viral phenomenon online. The poster quickly became the center of an international "media typhoon" widely covered by news outlets such as CNN, Fox News, and the Drudge Report.

Media coverage ranged from praise for the image's artistic value to critics labeling the poster racist. Philip Kennicott of The Washington Post described the poster as a "subtly coded, highly effective racial and political argument". Thomas Lifson, editor of The American Thinker, described it as "open mockery of Barack Obama, as disillusionment sets in with the man", and The First Post suggested the image marked "a turning of the tide of public opinion against a president who promised so much". Peter Bradshaw of The Guardian described the poster as "the single most chilling—and brilliant—piece of poisonous political propaganda I think I have ever seen."

=== Copyright and free speech controversy ===
The media coverage resulted in Flickr removing all copies of the image, citing a Digital Millennium Copyright Act (DMCA) takedown notice, and deleting forum threads discussing the image. This was met with much backlash from the Flickr userbase, and caused Flickr to change their DMCA takedown policy. The new policy provides for a page to remain if a takedown notice is filed against it, but for the image to be replaced with one that reads: "This image has been removed due to a claim of copyright infringement." A spokesperson for the Electronic Frontier Foundation, a digital rights advocacy group, defended Alkhateeb's image citing fair use protection. As a result of Flickr removing the Obama "Joker" image, some online communities viewed Alkhateeb as the most visible representative, in August 2009, of free speech on the Internet.

=== Protest symbol ===
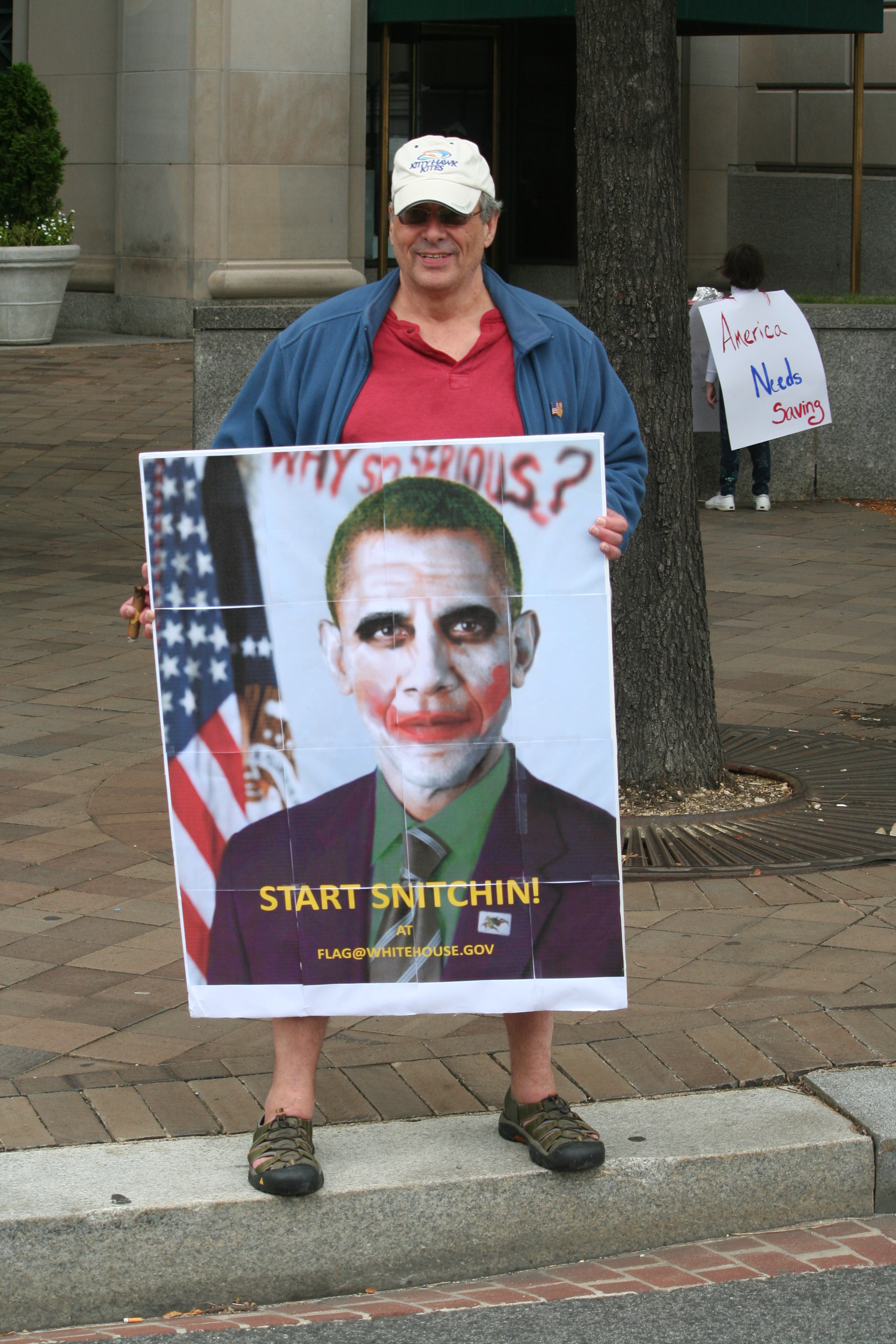
Washington taxpayer march in 2009

The image was adopted by some of Obama's critics and used for posters, T-shirts, bumper stickers, and other merchandise. The image is considered by some a symbol of the Tea Party protest movement. During the September 12, 2009, Taxpayer March on Washington, the largest demonstration against the Obama administration's policies to date, protesters denouncing deficit spending and the America's Affordable Health Choices Act of 2009, dubbed "Obamacare" by critics, carried Obama "Joker" signs captioned the doctor will see you now.

== Criticism ==
Some Democrats called the image racist, suggesting a similarity to blackface makeup that was used during minstrel show performances. Earl Ofari Hutchinson, president of the Los Angeles Urban Policy Roundtable, said, "Depicting the president as demonic and a socialist goes beyond political spoofery. It is mean-spirited and dangerous. We have issued a public challenge to the person or group that put up the poster to come forth and publicly tell why they have used this offensive depiction to ridicule President Obama."

Ray Tampa, president of the National Association for the Advancement of Colored People (NAACP) chapter in St. Petersburg, Florida, had a differing view: "I see it as the Joker, and being that I see it as the Joker I will have to say that it's fair game".

Alkhateeb responded to the usage of the image: "To accuse [Obama] of being a socialist is really ... immature. First of all, who said being a socialist is evil?" He also stated "socialism is an idea that's time has come and passed. It's basically like calling someone a loyalist to the British crown".

== See also ==
- Barack Obama "Hope" poster
- The New Yorker § 2008 Obama cover satire and controversy
- Red-baiting
