= Barack Obama "Hope" poster =

Image designed by Shepard Fairey

The most widely distributed version of Shepard Fairey's Obama poster, featuring the word "hope". Other versions used the words "change" and "progress".

The Barack Obama "Hope" poster is an image of U.S. presidential candidate Barack Obama, designed by American artist Shepard Fairey. The image was widely described as iconic and came to represent Obama's 2008 presidential campaign. It is a stylized stencil portrait of Obama in solid red, beige and (light and dark) blue, with the word "progress", "hope", or "change" below (and other words in some versions).

Fairey based the design on a photo taken by former Associated Press (AP) freelance photographer Mannie Garcia. He created the design in a day and printed it first as a street poster. It was then widely distributed—both as a digital image and other paraphernalia—during the 2008 election season, with approval from the Obama campaign. By July 2008, Sticker Robot had printed over 200,000 vinyl "Hope" stickers, 75% of which had been given away to support Obama's campaign. The image became one of the most widely recognized symbols of Obama's campaign, spawning many variations and imitations, including some commissioned by the Obama campaign.

In January 2009, after Obama had won the election, Fairey's mixed-media stenciled portrait version of the image was acquired by the Smithsonian Institution for its National Portrait Gallery. Later that month, the photograph that Fairey based the poster on was identified and the AP began negotiations for compensation. Fairey sued for a declaratory judgment that his poster was a fair use of the photograph. The parties settled out of court in January 2011. In February 2012, Fairey pleaded guilty to destroying and fabricating evidence showing that he had used the photograph; in September, he was sentenced to two years of probation, 300 hours of community service, and a fine of $25,000.

== Concept and design ==
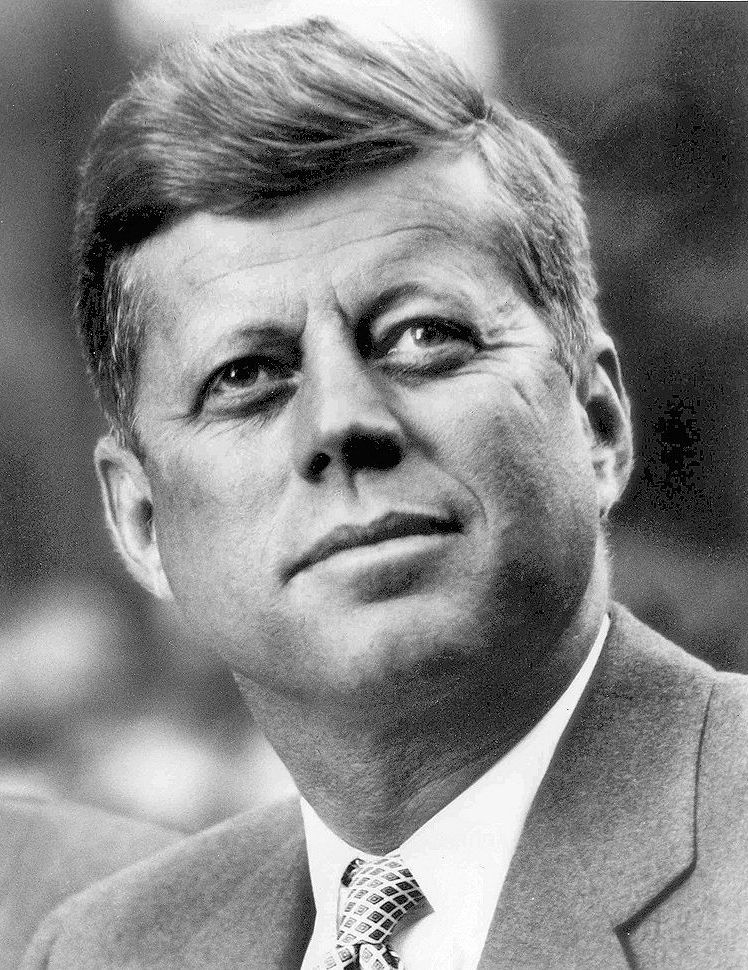
John F. Kennedy, White House photo portrait (1961)

In October 2007, Shepard Fairey, who had created political street art critical of the US government and George W. Bush, discussed the Obama presidential campaign with publicist Yosi Sergant. Sergant contacted the Obama campaign to seek permission for Fairey to design an Obama poster, which was granted a few weeks before Super Tuesday. Fairey decided to create a portrait of Obama based on his feeling that his "power and sincerity as a speaker would create a positive association with his likeness". Using Google Image Search, Fairey found a photograph of Obama taken by freelancer Mannie Garcia for the Associated Press, and created a poster design in a day. The original image had the word "progress" and featured Fairey's signature obey star—a symbol associated with his Andre the Giant Has a Posse street art campaign—embedded in the Obama campaign's sunrise logo. Due to the Obama campaign's concerns about the connotations of the word, Fairey changed the slogan printed under Obama's image from "progress" to "hope".

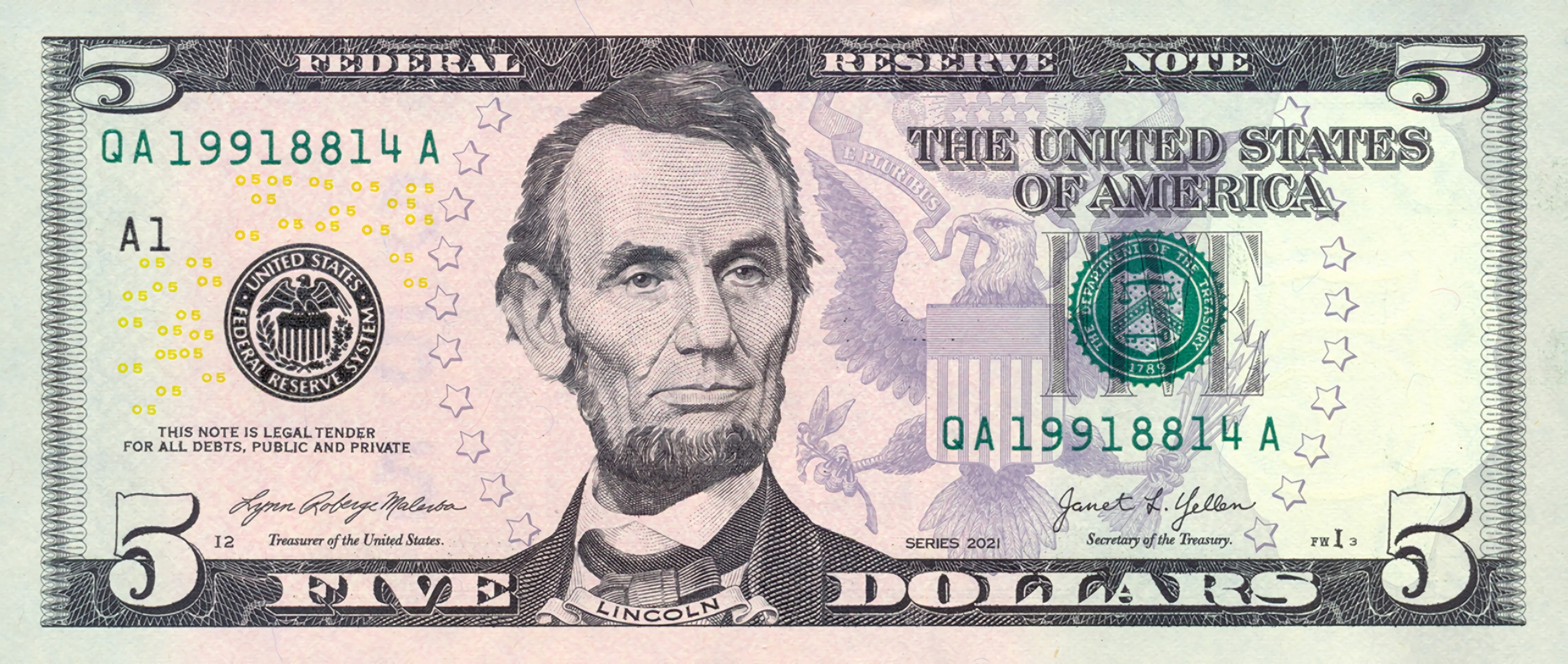
Series 2021 $5 bill

According to design writer Steven Heller, the poster was inspired by social realism. Heller saw it as part of a tradition of contemporary artists drawing inspiration from political candidates and producing "posters that break the mold not only in terms of color and style but also in message and tone". Fairey cited a photo of John F. Kennedy and the image of Abraham Lincoln on the US five-dollar bill as inspirations.

== Distribution during the 2008 campaign ==
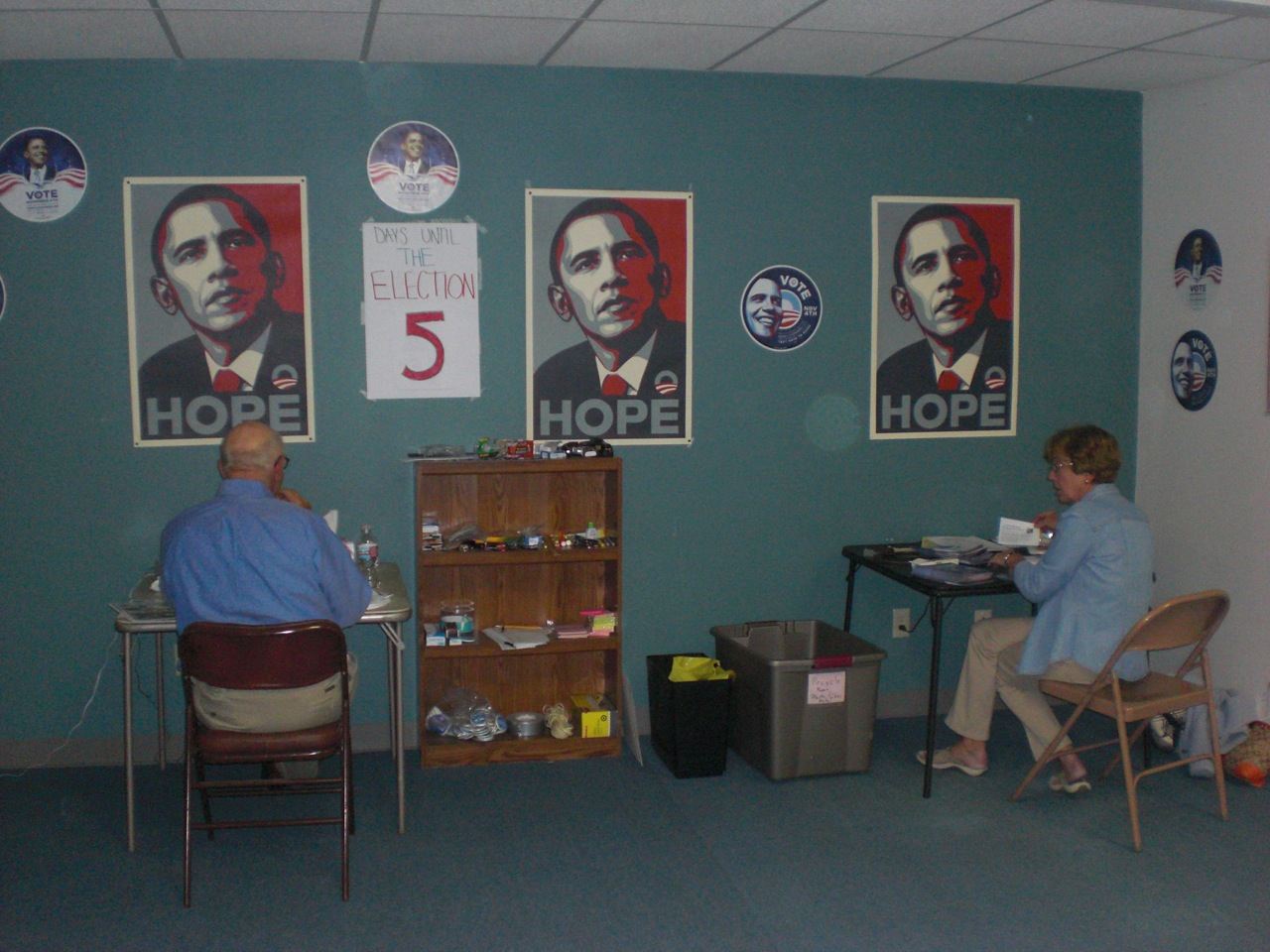
"Hope" posters on display at an Obama campaign office in 2008

Fairey began screen-printing posters soon after completing the design and showing it to Sergant. Initially, he sold three hundred fifty and put 350 more up in public. Beginning with that sale and continuing throughout the campaign, Fairey used proceeds from selling the image to produce more; after first printing, he made 4,000 more that were distributed at Obama rallies before Super Tuesday. He also put a printable digital version on his website. The image quickly went viral, spreading through social media and word of mouth.

After the initial 600 posters, the Obama campaign conveyed through Sergant that they wanted to promote the theme of hope, and most of the posters sold by Fairey subsequently had the word "hope" and later "change" instead of "progress"; the obey star was also absent from later versions.

Shepard Fairey, Obama Hope Gold (from the Artists for Obama portfolio) 2008, serigraph, edition of 300, 14" × 10¼" (36 × 26 cm)

By October 2008, Fairey and Sergant said they had printed 300,000 posters (with fewer than 2,000 sold and the rest given away or displayed). In addition, throughout the duration of the campaign, over 1,000,000 stickers were printed and disseminated by Stickerobot.com as well as clothing and other items with the image sold through Fairey's website. According to Fairey and Sergant, proceeds from sales of the image were used to produce more posters, stickers and other merchandise in support of the Obama campaign, rather than direct profit for Fairey.

In October 2008, Fairey created a small edition of serigraphs entitled Obama Hope Gold (from Artists for Obama). This portfolio was produced through a partnership between Gemini G.E.L. printing studio and the Democratic National Committee. The project supported the presidential campaign of Barack Obama. The Gold serigraphs were released just after Obama's inauguration, and are the third and final edition of Fairey's Hope prints of the president. An example of this work is in the permanent collection of the Museum of Modern Art, New York.

According to Guardian journalist Laura Barton, the image had "acquired the kind of instant recognition of Jim Fitzpatrick's Che Guevara poster".

In an interview with Esquire in 2015, Fairey said that Obama had not met his expectations as president, citing his use of drones and Domestic Spying.

== Parodies and imitations ==
As the campaign progressed, many parodies and imitations of Fairey's design appeared. For example, one anti-Obama version replaced the word "hope" with "hype", while parody posters featuring opponents Sarah Palin and John McCain had the word "nope". In January 2009, Paste launched a site allowing users to create their own versions of the poster. More than 10,000 images were uploaded to the site in its first two weeks.

Mad parodied the "hope" poster with an "Alfred E. Neuman for President!" poster. Alfred was on the poster, and the word "hope" was replaced with "hopeless". Anti-Gaddafi protesters in Chicago, in solidarity with the 2011 Libyan civil war, have co-opted the image. Dynamite Comics released a four-part crossover with Obama and Ash Williams of their Army of Darkness comics and the Evil Dead films. One of the issues covers had a picture of Ash Williams (played by Bruce Campbell in the films) in the style of the "Hope" poster with the bottom text reading "Hope?"

Fairey was also commissioned to create a number of works in the same style. He produced two other versions, based on different photographs, officially on behalf of the Obama campaign, and another to serve as the cover of the Person of the Year issue of Time. He also created a portrait of comedian Stephen Colbert in the same style, which appeared in an issue of Entertainment Weekly honoring Colbert's television show The Colbert Report.

Firas Alkhateeb, the student who designed the controversial Obama "Joker" image, cited Fairey as his greatest influence. Alkhateeb described the "Joker" image as a corrective to Fairey's glowing portrayal of Obama. Fairey said he did not agree with its political content, but that the "artwork is great in that it gets a point across really quickly".

The September 2009 issue of The Advocate, America's oldest-continuing LGBT publication, featured a cover image similar to Fairey's design. The blue and red coloring was replaced with pink and purple, but instead of "hope", the caption was "nope?". Jon Barrett, the magazine's editor-in-chief, said the cover expressed the frustration among some Democratic members of the LGBT community.

In 2025, The White House Instagram account posted a parody of the poster featuring the text “MS-13” with a portrait of Kilmar Abrego Garcia.

=== Honest Gil Fulbright ===
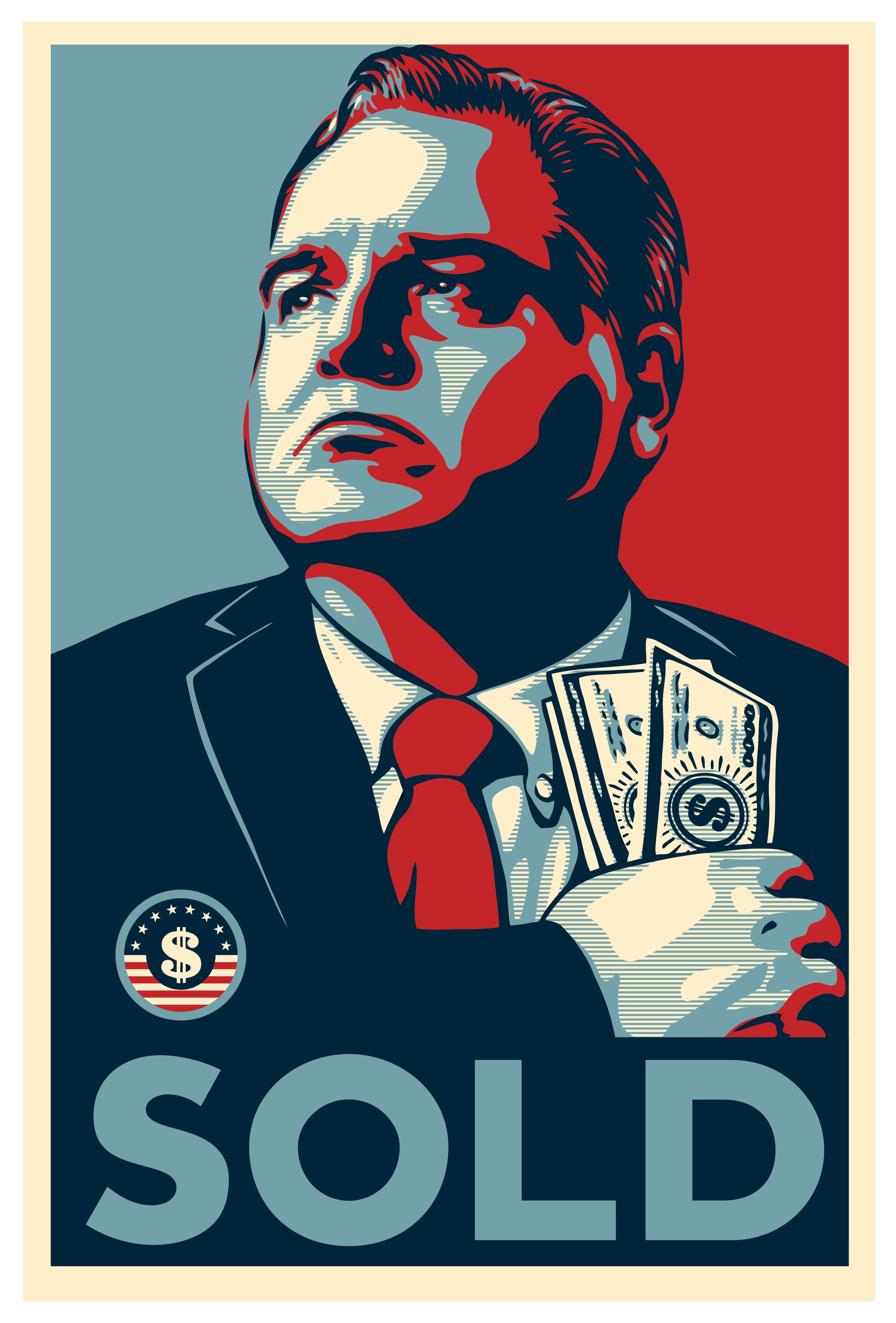
Honest Gil Fulbright SOLD poster

Shepard Fairey created an adaptation of the Obama HOPE poster for satirical Kentucky politician Honest Gil Fulbright. The poster features a portrait of Frank L. Ridley, the actor who portrays Fulbright, with the words "SOLD", which refers to Fulbright's "honest" political message: "I'm only in this thing for the money, but at least I'm honest about it."

=== Fairey's adaptation for the Occupy movement ===
Fairey's 2011 adaptation for the occupy movement

Sympathizing with the Occupy movement, in November 2011 Shepard Fairey introduced a variation of his "Hope" poster. In the new poster, he featured a Guy Fawkes mask, and the message "Mister President, we HOPE you're on our side", with the word "HOPE" in large font and the rest of the sentence in small font. The Obama campaign logo on the right was replaced by a similar logo with the inscription "We are the 99%".

=== Protests against the Australian government ===
In February 2015, online activism campaign Abbottsolutelynot launched a donation service to publish billboards in Sydney with Australian Prime Minister Tony Abbott's portrait captioned "HOPELESS". This was followed by posters of Liberal Party of Australia members, Treasurer Joe Hockey captioned "CLUELESS" and Attorney-General and Minister for the Arts George Brandis captioned ""HEARTLESS". The government had faced a spill motion earlier that month, and was later defeated in September 2015.

== Acquisition by Smithsonian ==
On January 7, 2009, the Smithsonian Institution's National Portrait Gallery announced it had acquired Fairey's hand-finished collage (stencil and acrylic on paper) version of the image (with the word "hope"), which the gallery said would go on display shortly before Obama's inauguration on January 20, 2009. The work was commissioned and later donated by art collectors Heather and Tony Podesta, the brother of Obama's transition co-chairman John Podesta. It is an unusual acquisition, in that the National Portrait Gallery normally collects official portraits as presidents are leaving office rather than before they take office.

== Origin and copyright ==
An AP photo by Mannie Garcia (upper left) was shown to be a near-perfect match, in contrast with a Reuters photograph (lower left) earlier purported to be the source.

The source photograph Fairey based the poster on was not publicly known until after Obama had won the election. After a mistaken attribution to Reuters photographer Jim Young for a similar-looking January 2007 photograph, in January 2009 photographer and blogger Tom Gralish discovered that the poster was based on an Associated Press (AP) photograph by freelance photographer Mannie Garcia. Garcia took the photograph at a 2006 media event with Kansas senator Sam Brownback, where the actor George Clooney was raising awareness of the War in Darfur after a trip to Sudan he had taken with his father.

In February 2009, the AP announced that it had determined "that the photograph used in the poster is an AP photo and that its use required permission" and announced it was in discussions with Fairey's attorney. Fairey was represented by Anthony Falzone, executive director of the Fair Use Project at Stanford University. Falzone was quoted in the press release: "We believe fair use protects Shepard's right to do what he did here." Fairey subsequently filed a federal lawsuit against the AP, seeking a declaratory judgment that his use of the AP photograph was protected by the fair use doctrine and so did not infringe their copyright.

In October 2009, Fairey admitted that he had based the poster on the AP photograph and had fabricated and destroyed evidence to hide the fact. Fairey's admission came after one of his employees told him that he had discovered relevant documents on an old hard drive. Realizing that these documents would reveal his cover-up, Fairey told the truth to his attorney.

Garcia contended that he retained copyright to the photo according to his AP contract. He said that he was "proud of the photograph and that Fairey did what he did artistically with it, and the effect it had", but that he did not "condone people taking things, just because they can, off the internet". Fairey countered that his conduct did not constitute "improper appropriation" because he had not taken any protected expression from Garcia's original photo. In addition, he claimed his behavior qualified as fair use. At trial AP would have to address both arguments.

A judge urged a settlement, stating that AP would win the case. The AP and Shepard Fairey settled out of court in January 2011. In a press release, the AP announced that it and Fairey had "agreed to work together going forward with the Hope image and share the rights to make the posters and merchandise bearing the Hope image and to collaborate on a series of images that Fairey will create based on AP photographs. The parties have agreed to additional financial terms that will remain confidential."

In a separate criminal action, federal prosecutors suggested that Fairey should face prison time for the destruction of evidence in the case, with the government sentencing request stating that "[a] sentence without any term of imprisonment sends a terrible message to those who might commit the same sort of criminal conduct. Encouraging parties to game the civil litigation system ... creates terrible incentives and subverts the truth-finding function of civil litigation." In September 2012, Fairey was sentenced to two years of probation, 300 hours of community service, and a fine of $25,000.

== Other works inspired by the "Hope" Poster ==
In August 2024, Shepard Fairey, the creator of the original Barack Obama "Hope" poster, created a similar poster of Kamala Harris with the caption "Forward", in reference to Harris's campaign slogan "We are not going back."

In October 2018 an online poster-creation tool called obamapostermaker.com was released by The Article 19 Group Inc. where users can import their own photo which can be edited along with a custom message to create an image in a similar style to the "Hope" poster. As of April 2025 it has been used almost 200,000 times by over 60,000 people.

== See also ==
- Barack Obama "Joker" poster
- The New Yorker § 2008 Obama cover satire and controversy
