= Tatyana Fazlalizadeh =

American artist, activist, and freelance illustrator

- Born: Oklahoma City, Oklahoma, U.S.
- Education: University of the Arts
- Known for: Illustrator, painting, public art
- Website: tlynnfaz.com

Tatyana Fazlalizadeh (born 1985) is an American artist, activist, and freelance illustrator. She is best known as the creator of the campaign and art exhibition Stop Telling Women to Smile.

== Biography ==
Fazlalizadeh was born in Oklahoma City, Oklahoma. Her mother was an artist and art teacher, but Tatyana did not begin creating her own art until she was in high school. She moved to Philadelphia to attend the University of the Arts, graduating in 2007 with a Bachelor of Fine Arts. She is of black and Iranian descent.

== Career ==
=== Style and work ===
Fazlalizadeh is primarily an oil painter. Her work featuring Barack Obama was included in the book Art For Obama: Designing Manifest Hope and the Campaign for Change, which was edited by artist Shepard Fairey. She is most well known for her Stop Telling Women to Smile campaign.

In addition to her work as an oil painter, Fazlalizadeh works as a street artist. Most of her public works are posters, like the ones found in the Stop Telling Women to Smile campaign. Much of Fazlalizadeh's public works are designed to be ephemeral because of the way they are applied to the surface with wheatpaste, weather and time cause the posters to fall apart. Given that her works are in the public domain and often have confrontational subject matter, they are often vandalized.

=== Stop Telling Women to Smile ===
In 2012 Fazlalizadeh gained notoriety when she began to use street art to speak out against the street harassment of women. Her poster campaign, Stop Telling Women to Smile (STWTS), was based upon interviews conducted with women about their experiences of public sexual harassment. Each poster features a portrait of a woman, along with a caption responding to her experience. Captions include statements such as "My outfit is not an invitation" and "No, you can't talk to me for a minute." The campaign offers women an opportunity to fight back against their harassers.

The original Stop Telling Me to Smile posters were displayed in Fazlalizadeh's neighborhood in Brooklyn, New York City. Fazlalizadeh subsequently ran a successful Kickstarter campaign to bring Stop Telling Women to Smile posters to other cities across the United States.

In 2015, Fazlalizadeh took the project to Mexico. In April 2015 Fazlalizadeh created "International Wheat Pasting Day" as another continuation of the Stop Telling Women to Smile campaign. As a part of this event, participants, in groups of three, went out on April 17, 2015 with images received from Fazlalizadeh to paste works all over the world in various languages. Participants were also able to upload their plans and accomplishments to the STWTS website. Through this project Fazlalizadeh aims to have her work and message reach a larger audience and to engage her supporters in her practice.

Published in 2020, Stop Telling Women to Smile: Stories of Street Harassment and How We're Taking Back Our Power, documents Fazlalizadeh's street art project. The book includes excerpts from the original interviews and images from STWTS, revealing Fazlalizadeh's process and providing a "contribution to the important conversation about endemic sexism."

=== Recent work ===
In 2016, Fazlalizadeh created a mural titled Sakia, Sakia, Sakia, Sakia, along a portion of McCarter Highway in Newark, New Jersey. The mural is in tribute to Sakia Gunn, a 15-year-old lesbian who was murdered in a hate crime in 2003. The mural was part of a broader mural named Portraits, part of the Newark Downtown District's Gateways to Newark Initiative.

In response to the 2016 United States presidential election, Fazlalizadeh wanted to make a work in her home and historically Republican Party state of Oklahoma. The text on the piece includes, "America is black. It is Native. It wears hijab. It is Spanish speaking tongue. It is migrant. It is a woman. Has been here. And it's not going anywhere." In this piece the location of the piece in Oklahoma is just as important as the overall concept to Fazlalizadeh, according to her, because of its political history. Fazlalizadeh's work appears in the Netflix TV series She's Gotta Have It.

In 2018 Fazlalizadeh was a participating artist in Round 48: "Beyond Social Practice" at Project Row Houses in Houston. Her installation "The Personal as Political" incorporated the stories of people who identify as Black, queer, and/or women to create political art.

In 2020, Fazlalizadeh created a mural series in New York City featuring portraits of Breonna Taylor, Atatiana Jefferson, Tony McDade, and Nina Pop as part of her work addressing racial and transphobic violence.
