= Yosi Sergant =

American publicist (born 1976)

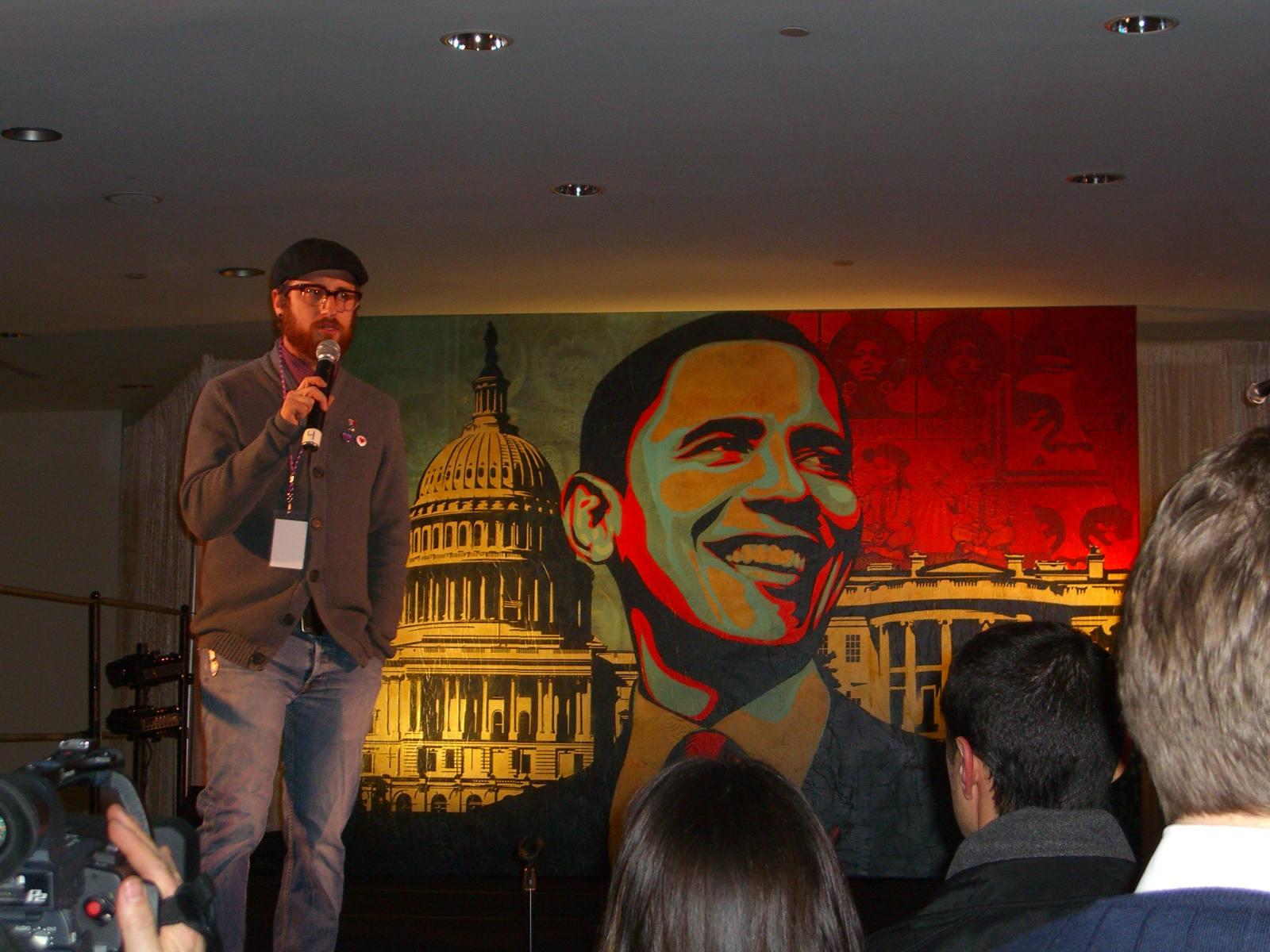
- Sergant speaking at the opening of Manifest Hope, Washington, DC art show
- Born: August 14, 1976 (age 50)
- Education: University of California, Los Angeles (BA)
- Occupation: Publicist
- Known for: Marketing for 2008 Obama presidential campaign, specifically "Hope" poster
- Website: https://www.taskforce.us/

Yosi Sergant (born 1976) is an American publicist and activist. He is known for his commissioning and management of the "Hope" poster created during the 2008 presidential election by Shepard Fairey and for creating the art exhibit and events Manifest Equality, Manifest Justice, and Manifest Hope.

== Early life ==
Sergant's family is from Israel but he grew up in Los Angeles. His father was a Kibbutz leader and his mother is a school teacher.

Sergant graduated a degree in world arts and culture from UCLA in 1997. Early in his career, he worked for former Israeli prime minister Yitzhak Rabin and filmmaker Larry Clark.

== Career ==
=== Obama Campaign and HOPE poster ===
Sergant worked as a media consultant for the Barack Obama 2008 presidential campaign under the Jennifer Gross’ Evolutionary Media Group since 2006. Sergant engaged artist Shepard Fairey, then most widely known for his Andre the Giant Has a Posse street art campaign, in a conversation about politics while at a party. The conversation encouraged Fairey to create the Barack Obama "Hope" poster which featured the likeness of then candidate Barack Obama.

Sergant co-produced the poster and the subsequent Hope Campaign which became not only the Obama campaign's official image, but a globally recognized piece of art. New Yorker art critic Peter Schjeldahl called the poster “the most efficacious American political illustration since ‘Uncle Sam Wants You.’” "First disseminated as a street poster," it has appeared on a variety of merchandise, and continues to be represented in movies, television series, video games and internet videos.

The unique style of the original poster has been parodied countless times since its release, featuring the likeness of high-profile celebrities and figures like the Pope, Homer Simpson and most recently Donald Trump; and in 2017, Fairy paid homage the Hope poster with his "We The People" campaign poster for Women's Rights in America and it became the image for the well publicized national marches that took place in January 2017, which Sergant participated as an event organizer for the Los Angeles demonstration.

=== Obama Administration ===
After the 2008 campaign, Sergant joined the White House's Office of Public Engagement. On May 11, 2009, Sergant was appointed Director of Communications for the National Endowment for the Arts.

On August 10, 2009, Sergant participated in a conference call (he helped organize) about United We Serve, a government program which encouraged community service in four areas chosen by the Corporation for National Service. The conference call included about 100 members of the media and arts community, and the invitation listed members of the media as hosts for the call. During the call, Sergant and the White House Deputy Director of Public Engagement Buffy Wicks asked the artists on the call to make art about health care reform, a topic being debated nationally at the time due to President Obama's proposed legislation later known as ObamaCare.

On August 25, 2009, Sergant became "the target of conservative ire," which "was not surprising. Few other government programs [NEA] have been as closely watched and viciously attacked by conservative Republicans in the past 30 years." An advocate for replacing the NEA with a committee,Patrick Courrielche, blogged about the call, calling it "a gross overreach of the National Endowment for the Arts." Talk show host Glenn Beck interviewed Courrielche, and played Sergant's recorded comments bringing the story to national attention. The initial report included excerpts from the call, alleging that the NEA was attempting to use its influence to have artists create work in support of the Obama Administration's domestic policy. On August 27, The Washington Times reported that Sergant stated that the NEA did not organize the call or invite attendees. Courrielche produced an invitation sent by Sergant, which contradicted the communications director's claim, and released the full audio and transcript of the call on September 21, 2009. One government organization called the conference call "inappropriate" and stated that "It's not what the NEA was created for, it's not supposed to be helping the president's agenda; that's not the point." NEA Chairman Landesman issued a statement stating that the call was not a means to promote any legislative agenda but rather to inform members of the arts community of an opportunity to become involved in volunteerism through the United We Serve program, but added, "Some of the language used by the former NEA Director of Communications was, unfortunately, not appropriate and did not reflect the position of the NEA. This employee has been relieved of his duties as director of communications." This was amended to "As regards Yosi Sergant, he has not left the National Endowment for the Arts. He remains with the agency, although not as director of communications." and was reassigned the title of New Media and Special Projects Advisor. The White House stated, "We regret any comments on the call that may have been misunderstood or troubled other participants," and issued new guidelines to help staffers avoid any appearance of impropriety.

The Washington Post reported that conservative television host Glenn Beck used the incident as fodder for his "ongoing outrage campaign against the left." "Another one of Glenn Beck's targets has been demoted," Variety reported, referring to his targeting ............ Reacting to the full transcript, arts journalist Ben Davis, of ArtNet, argued that the full text exonerated Sergant, and called the attack "politically motivated and built on mostly fabricated information". Sergant later stated "They trapped me." His "ideas hoped to bring the NEA into the social media age, using things like the music festival Coachella (with 300,000 arts-minded attendees), Flickr's image-curating abilities, and artist-lead volunteerism efforts to engage young people in the arts. “That's not political,” he says. “Someone else made it political.”"

=== Producing art exhibits and events ===
Since leaving his job with the National Endowment, Sergant has produced many art exhibits and events. He opened Task Force, a creative agency that services clientele focused on social change, in 2010 in Los Angeles. Clients for public campaigns include the United Nations Foundation, the White House, The Nature Conservancy, the MacArthur Foundation, Rock The Vote, the County of Los Angeles, and Amnesty International.

After launching the Hope Poster and campaign with artist Shepard Fairey in 2008, Sergant encouraged more artists to create powerful images featuring then candidate Barack Obama. Among the artists was painter Ron English who created another now iconic poster entitled Abraham Obama. He also developed a bicycle spoke card featuring the art of Margaret Coble that was distributed in Portland, Oregon during the primaries that year. The concept grew and soon artists around the United States were creating art to help encourage people to vote for Obama. The movement led to Sergant's idea to create a pop-up art gallery in Denver, Colorado during the Democratic National Convention. The event was titled Manifest Hope and it featured not only art from popular street artists, but also a concert (in collaboration) that featured Cold War Kids, Death Cab for Cutie and Zooey Deschanel.

In 2010, his Los Angeles-based multi-day event, gallery and concert series,Manifest Equality, inside an abandoned grocery store on Vine Street in Hollywood, California, featured renowned artists, musicians, speakers, celebrities and activists with a focus on civil rights. Over 200 artist participated including Gary Baseman, Robbie Conal and Fairey. The RE:FORM SCHOOL exhibit event examining public school reform was hosted in October 2010 in SoHo, Manhattan.

In 2015, Sergant created and produced Manifest Justice, again a ten-day event featuring hundreds of artists this time focusing on the message of racial equality and criminal justice, health, and immigration reform.
