= Frank L. Ridley =

American film and television actor (1958–2025)

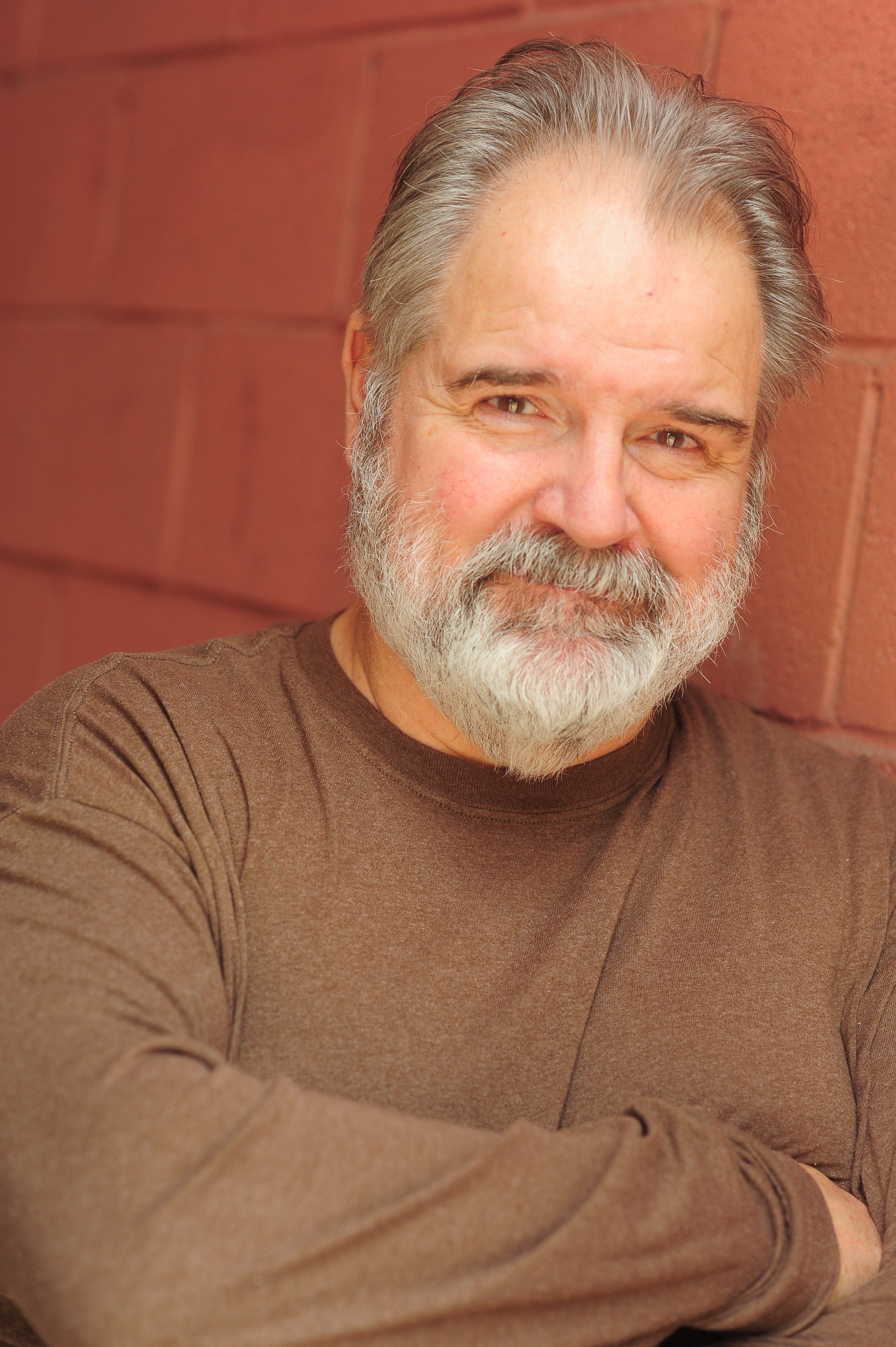
- Ridley in 2018
- Born: Frank Lawrence Ridley; August 18, 1958; Michigan, U.S.
- Died: June 3, 2025 (aged 66)
- Occupation: Actor
- Years active: 1998–2025
- Website: frankridley.com

Frank Lawrence Ridley (August 18, 1958 – June 3, 2025) was an American film and television actor. Born into a musical family in Michigan, he originally trained as an opera singer with Richard Conrad. After attending Boston Conservatory of Music, he started his career as a regular member of Sarah Caldwell's Opera Company of Boston.

== Life and career ==
His television career started when he was cast as Terry Mulligan in the Showtime network series Brotherhood. His other television work included roles on House of Cards, Orange Is the New Black, Alpha House, Olive Kitteridge, The Night Of, The Leftovers, and 30 Rock.

Ridley also featured in a variety of films including Inside Llewyn Davis, Birdman, and The Judge.

Ridley died on June 3, 2025, at the age of 66.

=== Honest Gil Fulbright ===
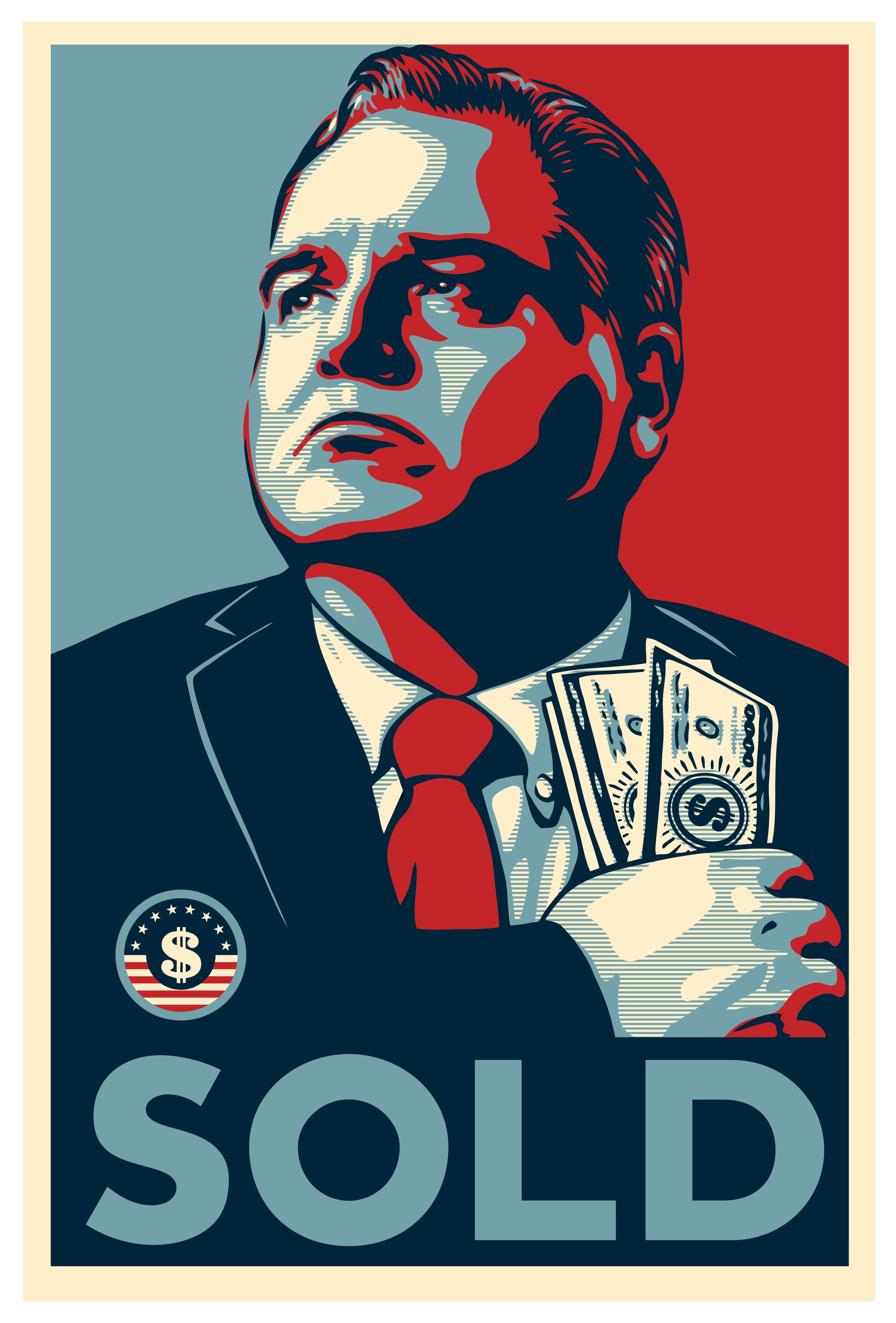
Honest Gil Fulbright SOLD Poster

Honest Gil Fulbright is a satirical political candidate portrayed by Frank Ridley. Fulbright originally "ran" for the U.S. Senate in 2014 as an "honest politician for Kentucky" on behalf of RepresentUs. His campaign message was "I'm only in this thing for the money, but at least I'm honest about it."

Ridley portrayed Fulbright on CNN, The Today Show, Fox & Friends, Al Jazeera, The Washington Post, and The Huffington Post.

Fulbright's campaign got a powerful boost when noted artist Shepard Fairey reimagined his iconic Barack Obama "Hope" poster as a Gil Fulbright "SOLD" poster to help raise funds for the finance-reform-minded satirical campaign.

== Filmography ==
=== Films ===
Year	Title	Role	Notes
1998	Next Stop Wonderland	Whale Watch Captain (voice)	
1998	Bobby Loves Mangos	Dwight Stevenson	Short film
1999	Temps	Himself	
2003	Little Erin Merryweather	Joe Havey	
2005	Long Distance	Sheriff	
2007	Underdog	Police Sergeant	
2007	The Great Debaters	Security Guard	
2009	The Box	Detective Starrs	
2014	The Call to the Post	Ray	Short film
2010	Edge of Darkness	Automatic Weapons Cop	
2011	Jimmy Boy	Barney	Short film
2013	Inside Llewyn Davis	Union Hall Man 1	
2014	Birdman	Mr. Roth	
2014	The Judge	Jury Foreman	
2017	Professor Marston and the Wonder Women	Office Manager	
2017	The Post	New York Times Staffer	
2019	Jungleland	Burly Father	
2021	Don't Look Up	Flight Director Anderson	
2022	Out of the Blue (2022_film)	Frank	
2022	Boston Strangler	Ida's Super	
2022	Mr. Harrigan's Phone	Reverend Mooney	
2023	Finestkind	Salty	
TBA	Martyr of Gowanus	Laszlo Gaspari	filming

=== Television ===
Year	Title	Role	Notes
2006	Waterfront	Maître d'	Unproduced TV series
2007	Law & Order: Criminal Intent	Coach Bloom	Episode: "Offense"
2007	I'm Paige Wilson	Oscar Tucson	TV movie
2006–2008	Brotherhood	Terry Mulligan	16 episodes
2009	Empire State	Steve Marks	TV movie
2009	30 Rock	Traffic Cop	
2009	Mercy	Leo Kalinowski	
2010	Boardwalk Empire	Conductor	
2011	Law & Order: Special Victims Unit	Dispatcher	
2014	Unforgettable	Burly Man	
2012	Nurse Jackie	Patient on Gurney	
2013	Clear History	Detective	TV movie
2014	Orange Is the New Black	Bob Shore	
2014	The Leftovers	Neighbor Paul	
2014	Olive Kitteridge	Mr. Thibodeau	TV miniseries; 2 episodes
2014	Alpha House	Agribusiness Guy #2	
2015	House of Cards	Harlan Traub	
2016	The Night Of	Jerry	TV miniseries; 2 episodes
2016	Bull	Judge Albert Darling	
2017	Orange Is the New Black	Frank	
2017	GLOW	Marlo	
2017–2018	The Marvelous Mrs. Maisel	Sal	2 episodes
2018	Castle Rock	Lieutenant Chesterton	2 episode
2018	Bizaardvark	Santa Claus	Episode: "Holiday Video Sketchtacular"
2020	Bull	Detective Jacobson	
2020	Law & Order: Special Victims Unit	Dr. Brian Gold	
2021	At That Age	ICU Doctor	
2022	WeCrashed	Skeptical Landlord	
2022	FBI: Most Wanted	Matthew Pitts	
2023	The Gilded Age	Mr. Whitmore	
2023	The Blacklist	Heinrich Wittelsbach	

=== Video games ===
Year	Title	Role
1999	Pharaoh	Pharaoh
2018	Red Dead Redemption 2	Jim "Boy" Calloway

== Awards and nominations ==
Year	Award	Category	Motive	Result
2015	Washington D.C. Area Film Critics Association Award	Best Ensemble	Birdman or (The Unexpected Virtue of Ignorance)	Won
2015	San Diego Film Critics Society Award	Best Performance by an Ensemble	Birdman or (The Unexpected Virtue of Ignorance)	Won

== Sources ==
- https://www.rockstargames.com/reddeadredemption2/credits
- https://www.giantbomb.com/pharaoh/3030-17680/credits/
