= Kwaku Alston =

American photographer

- Born: Philadelphia, U.S.
- Occupation: Photographer
- Known for: Photographing Barack and Michelle Obama
- Notable work: Art for Obama (2009)
- Website: www.kwakualston.com

Kwaku Alston is an American photographer and director. His editorial work has been published in The New York Times Magazine, Harper's Bazaar, Vanity Fair, Billboard, The New Yorker, Rolling Stone, and Time.

== Life and Work ==
Born in Philadelphia, Alson has photographed Key Art and Publicity stills and motion for movie and TV posters for major Hollywood studios including NBCUniversal, Paramount, Netflix, Amazon Prime Video, and commercial work for Chase, Apple, NBA, Coca-Cola, Target and Verizon. He has also photographed President Barack Obama and First Lady Michelle Obama on several occasions, including for Essence and the 2009 art book Art for Obama. Kwaku was also featured in Apple's 2020 Keynote as one of the modern creative visionaries for the M1 chip launch.

After graduating from the Rochester Institute of Technology, Kwaku launched his career in New York City, quickly shooting for major magazines and advertising agencies in his early twenties. Today, he is based between New York and Los Angeles.

Beyond commercial work, Kwaku has partnered with a range of charities and nonprofit organizations, including the DesignACure Breast Cancer Awareness Campaign, Black AIDS Institute, Smiley Faces Foundation, and Project Angel Food. His photography of Betty White was the base for the 2025 USPS Commemorative Betty White Postage Stamp.

Kwaku delivered the 2025 commencement address to the RIT College of Art and Design where he received RIT's Outstanding Alumnus Award, the highest honor RIT can bestow upon a graduate.

== Exhibitions ==
- 2025: Hauser & Wirth "Destiny is a Rose"
- 2025: Bonhams x Project Angel Food "Angel Art"
- 2024: Leica Gallery LA "Egungun: The Spirit Catchers of Benin"
- 2021: Leica Gallery LA "Somewhere in Between"

== Publications ==
- Black Masculinities, Hatje Cantz, 2023.
- Art for Obama: Designing Manifest Hope and the Campaign for Change, Abrams Image, 2009

== Awards ==
- 2026: American Photography 42 Chosen Winner
- 2025: RIT Outstanding Alumni Award
- 2025: American Photography 41 Chosen Winner
- 2024: Communication Arts 65th Photo Annual Award of Excellence
- 2024: American Photography 40 Selected Winner
- 2021: Photographer of The Year - Project Angel Food and STORIES Photo 21 Honoree
- 2012: RIT Distinguished Alumni Award, College of Imaging Arts and Sciences
- 2018: American Photography 34 Selected Winner
- 2003: American Photography 19 Selected Winner
