= Mannie Garcia =

American freelance photojournalist

Mannie Garcia is an American freelance photojournalist currently based in Washington, D.C. His photos have been in many publications including TIME, The Washington Post and USA Today.

== Career ==
Garcia's photos of the Ramstein airshow disaster in West Germany won a World Press Photo Award in 1989. During the disaster, he narrowly escaped death when a flying chunk of one of the jet's wings nearly hit him in the head. One of his cameras was smashed by shrapnel, preventing it from hitting him instead. After shooting photos of the crashing jets and fleeing spectators, Garcia helped the wounded. Sixty-seven spectators and three pilots died in the disaster, and 346 spectators sustained serious injuries in the resulting explosion and fire.

In the early 1990s, Garcia shot photos of the Somali Civil War. In the mid-1990s he photographed the Bosnian War for The New York Times.

Garcia's photograph of President George W. Bush surveying the damage from Hurricane Katrina in August 2005 from the high remove of Air Force One became a symbol of his administration's slow and detached reaction to the human suffering and wreckage below.

In April 2006, Garcia took the photograph of Barack Obama that was later used uncredited by artist Shepard Fairey as the basis of Fairey's Barack Obama HOPE poster.

=== First Amendment arrest case ===
In 2011, Garcia was arrested by a police officer in Wheaton, Maryland. According to Garcia, after he began taking pictures of a police incident across the street, one of the officers grabbed him by the neck, struck him, slammed his head onto a police car, and removed the memory chip from his camera. Garcia was charged with disorderly conduct and the police report claimed that he "threw himself to the ground, attempting to injure himself." He was acquitted of the charge several months later. His White House press credentials were not renewed because of the outstanding charge, but were renewed after the acquittal. On December 7, 2012, Garcia reinstated a lawsuit against Montgomery County, Maryland, its chief of police and several officers of the Montgomery County Police Department seeking among other things, compensatory and punitive damages. On March 4, 2013, the Justice Department filed a statement of interest, asserting that citizens have a First Amendment right to peacefully photograph law enforcement officers in the exercise of their duties and urging the court not to dismiss the case, as sought by Montgomery County and other defendants. On March 3, 2017, Montgomery County agreed to settle the lawsuit by paying Garcia $45,000. Later in 2017, the court awarded over $200,000 in legal fees to Garcia's lawyers. Following the outcome, the Montgomery County Police Department changed its policy regarding press documenting police in the line of duty.
