= Art for Obama =

2009 book edited by Shepard Fairey and Jennifer Gross

Art For Obama: Designing Manifest Hope and the Campaign for Change
- Author: Shepard Fairey; Tatyana Fazlalizadeh; Ron English; David Choe; Kwaku Alston
- Language: English
- Genre: Art book
- Publication date: 2009
- Publication place: United States
- Media type: Print
- Pages: 184

Art For Obama: Designing Manifest Hope and the Campaign for Change is a 2009 art book dedicated to the United States presidency of Barack Obama. It was edited by artist Shepard Fairey.
