= Political statement =

Commentary on an issue of political, identity or social significance

The term political statement is used to refer to a communication which makes commentary on an issue of political, identity or social significance. There is no limit on the form a political statement may take - they may be written, verbal, constituted by actions, or communicated through objects, clothing, design, traditions, language or style.

A political statement can vary from a mass demonstration to the wearing of a badge with a political slogan.

Often, political statements are intended to be provocative, as a form of protest. For example, the Eurovision Song Contest 2023 was described as a "political statement" comprising a "four-hour anti-war protest, with extra neon." At the 2021 Met Gala, Democratic U.S. Representative Alexandria Ocasio-Cortez of New York attended wearing a controversial gown which targeted the attendees of the Met; worn off-the-shoulder, her gown was sewn with the phrase "tax the rich" in bold red satin lettering. This political statement faced controversy as an arguably hypocritical act to condemn wealth inequality while attending an event with a $35,000 ticket. In an interview, designer Aurora James explained how she thought it smart to be able to deliver the message directly to those who need to hear it. The Met Gala has been the stage for various other political statements in recent years.

Less explicit examples of political statements are evident where individuals conduct or express themselves in ways which challenge political, identity or social norms. By way of example, the rejection of social or legal pressure to wear a hijab in ceratain societies may be a political statement. By contrast, Pauline Hanson made a political statement by wearing a burqa in the Senate chamber of Australian Parliament to underscore a call she intended to make to ban the religious garment on national security grounds. Clothing and fashion has also been used to make political statements by the LGBTQ community, while hairstyles and gardens have also been described as having been used to make political statements.
