= Shepard Fairey =

American street artist and activist (born 1970)

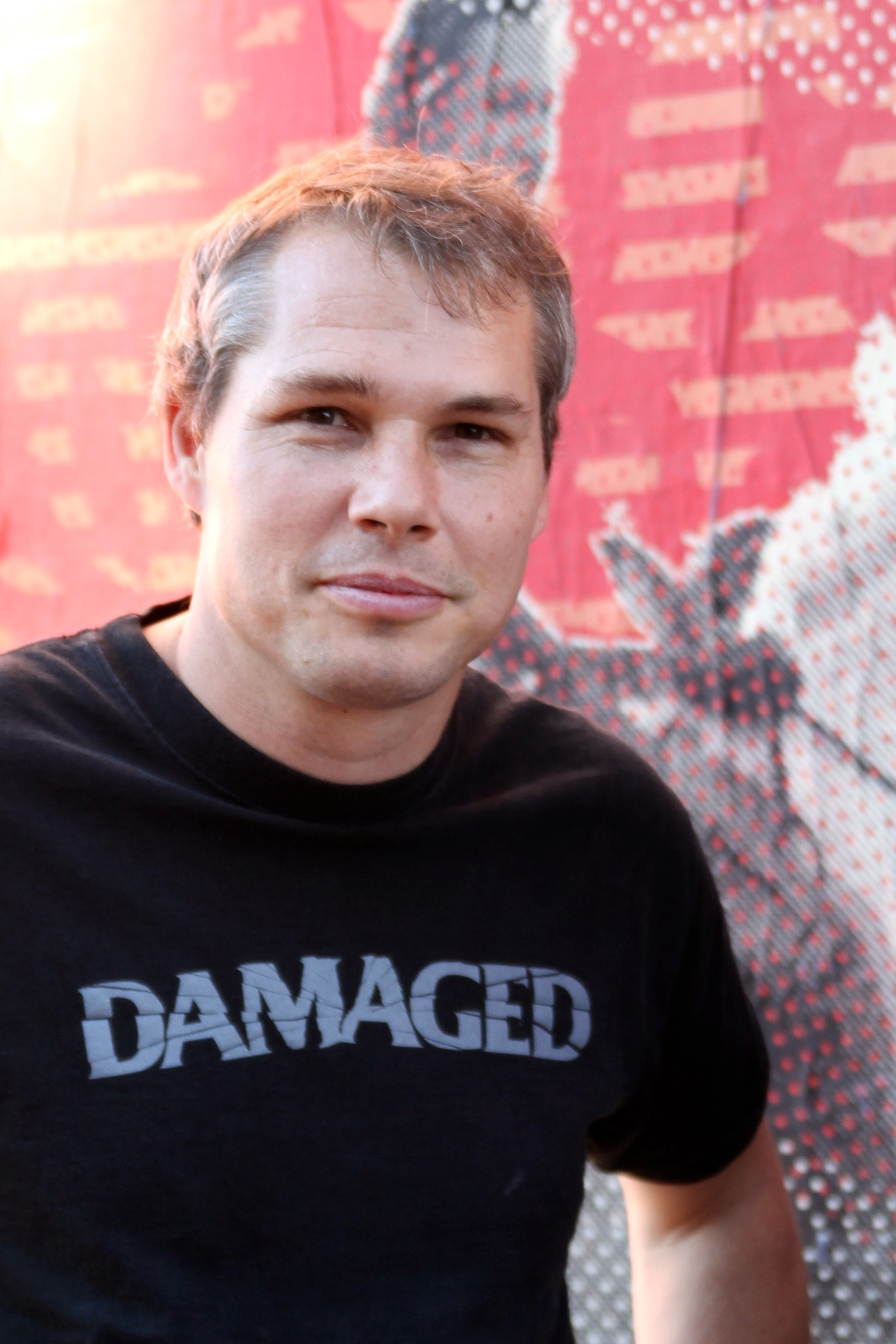
- Fairey at the installation of THE BLACK HILLS ARE NOT FOR SALE in Los Angeles on November 26, 2011
- Born: Frank Shepard Fairey; February 15, 1970 (age 56); Charleston, South Carolina, U.S.
- Education: Rhode Island School of Design (BFA)
- Known for: Public art, Stenciling
- Notable work: Andre the Giant Has a Posse; Hope; Rock the Vote; OBEY Clothing
- Spouse: Amanda Fairey
- Children: 2
- Awards: Brit Insurance Design Awards Design of the Year; AS220 Free Culture Award

Frank Shepard Fairey (born February 15, 1970) is an American contemporary artist, activist and founder of OBEY Clothing who emerged from the skateboarding scene. In 1989, he designed the "Andre the Giant Has a Posse" (...OBEY...) sticker campaign while attending the Rhode Island School of Design (RISD).

Fairey designed the Barack Obama "Hope" poster for the 2008 U.S. presidential election. The Institute of Contemporary Art, Boston, has described him as one of the best known and most influential street artists. His work is included in the collections at The Smithsonian; the Los Angeles County Museum of Art; the Museum of Modern Art in New York City; the Museum of Contemporary Art San Diego; the National Portrait Gallery in Washington, D.C.; the Virginia Museum of Fine Arts in Richmond; and the Victoria and Albert Museum in London.

His style has been described as a "bold iconic style that is based on styling and idealizing images."

== Early life ==
Shepard Fairey was born and raised in Charleston, South Carolina. His father, Strait Fairey, is a doctor, and his mother, Charlotte, a realtor. He attended Porter-Gaud School in Charleston and transferred to high school at Idyllwild Arts Academy in Idyllwild, California, from which he graduated in 1988.

Fairey became involved with art in 1984, when he started to place his drawings on skateboards and T-shirts. He moved to Rhode Island in 1988 to attend the Rhode Island School of Design (RISD). In 1992, he earned a Bachelor of Fine Arts degree in Illustration from RISD.

== Career ==
=== "OBEY Giant" sticker ===
Fairey first created the "Andre the Giant Has a Posse" image in 1989, while attending the Rhode Island School of Design (RISD). In 2008 Fairey commented that: "The Andre the Giant sticker was just a spontaneous, happy accident. I was teaching a friend how to make stencils in the summer of 1989, and I looked for a picture to use in the newspaper, and there just happened to be an ad for wrestling with André the Giant and I told him that he should make a stencil of it. He said 'Nah, I’m not making a stencil of that, that’s stupid!' but I thought it was funny so I made the stencil and I made a few stickers and the group of guys I was hanging out with always called each other The Posse, so it said Andre the Giant Has a Posse, and it was sort of appropriated from hip-hop slang – Public Enemy, N.W.A and Ice-T were all using the word."

In 1996, Fairey altered the image of André the Giant and changed the text to read OBEY, which Fairey has described as being a "transition ...into something that had more of an Orwellian connotation". It is this new image with the text "OBEY" which has become a worldwide phenomenon.

The "Obey Giant" image was also put up on the streets in posters, stencils and stickers via a campaign from an international network of collaborators as well as by people who had no connection to Fairey but were interested in putting the image on the streets. The Obey Giant image was for Fairey something that would inspire curiosity and cause people to question their relationship with their surroundings and according to the Obey Giant website, "The sticker has no meaning but exists only to cause people to react, to contemplate and search for meaning in the sticker". The website also says, by contrast, that those who are familiar with the sticker find humor and enjoyment from it and that those who try to analyze its meaning only burden themselves and may condemn the art as an act of vandalism from an evil, underground cult.

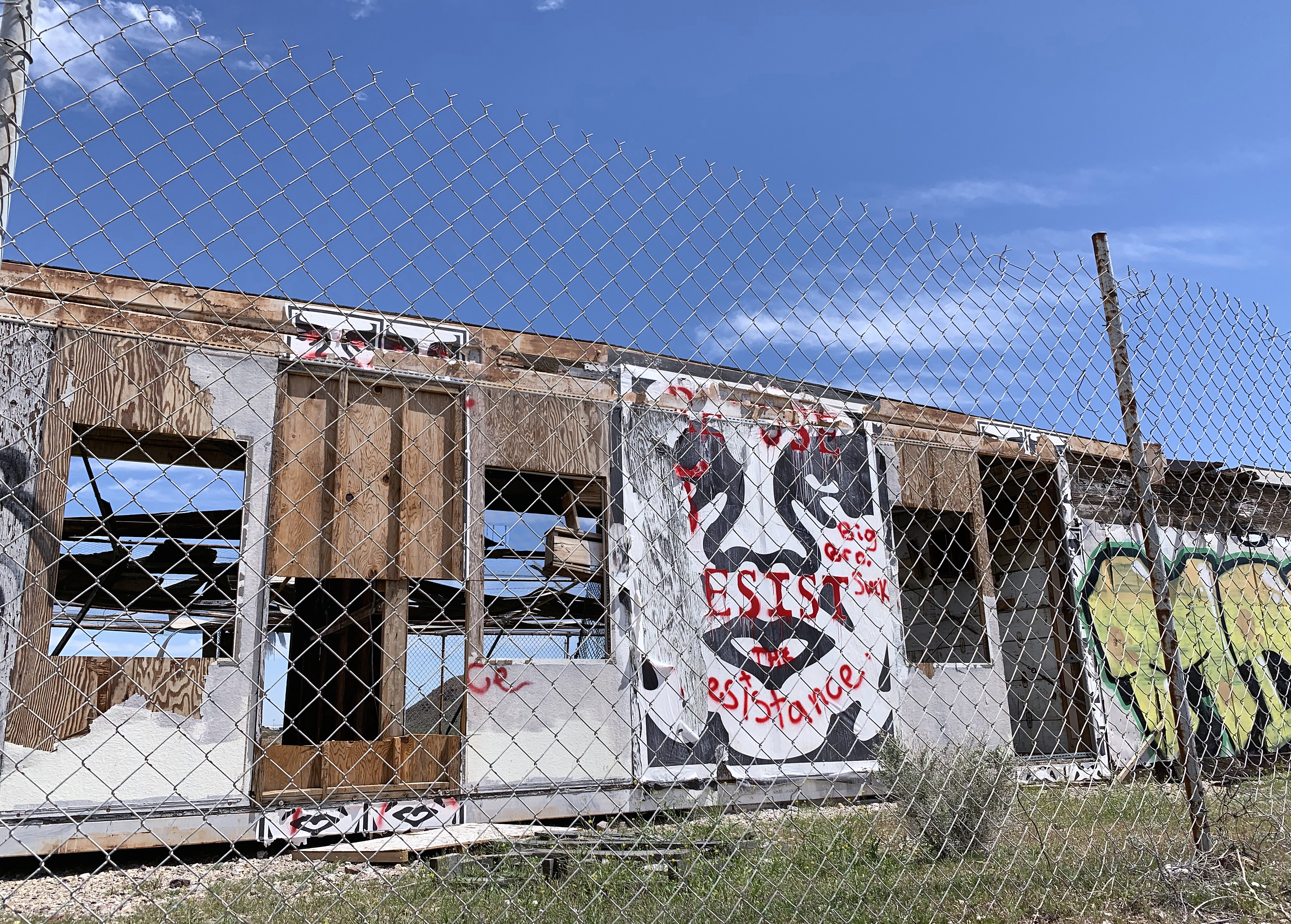
An OBEY Giant poster in the Mojave Desert in Barstow California. 2024

Originally intending the sticker campaign to gain fame among his classmates and college peers, Fairey says:

At first I was only thinking about the response from my clique of art school and skateboard friends. The fact that a larger segment of the public would not only notice, but investigate, the unexplained appearance of the stickers was something I had not contemplated. When I started to see reactions and consider the sociological forces at work surrounding the use of public space and the insertion of a very eye-catching but ambiguous image, I began to think there was the potential to create a phenomenon.

In a manifesto he wrote between 1990 and 1991, and since posted on his website, he links his work with Heidegger's concept of phenomenology. His "Obey" Campaign is from the John Carpenter movie They Live which starred pro wrestler Roddy Piper, taking a number of its slogans, including the "Obey" slogan, as well as the "This is Your God" slogan. Fairey has spun off the OBEY clothing line from the original sticker campaign. He also uses the slogan "The Medium is the Message" borrowed from Marshall McLuhan. Shepard Fairey has stated in an interview that part of his work is inspired by other street artists.

"OBEY Giant" image

OBEY Giant image stenciled on a building wall in Athens, Greece. 2009

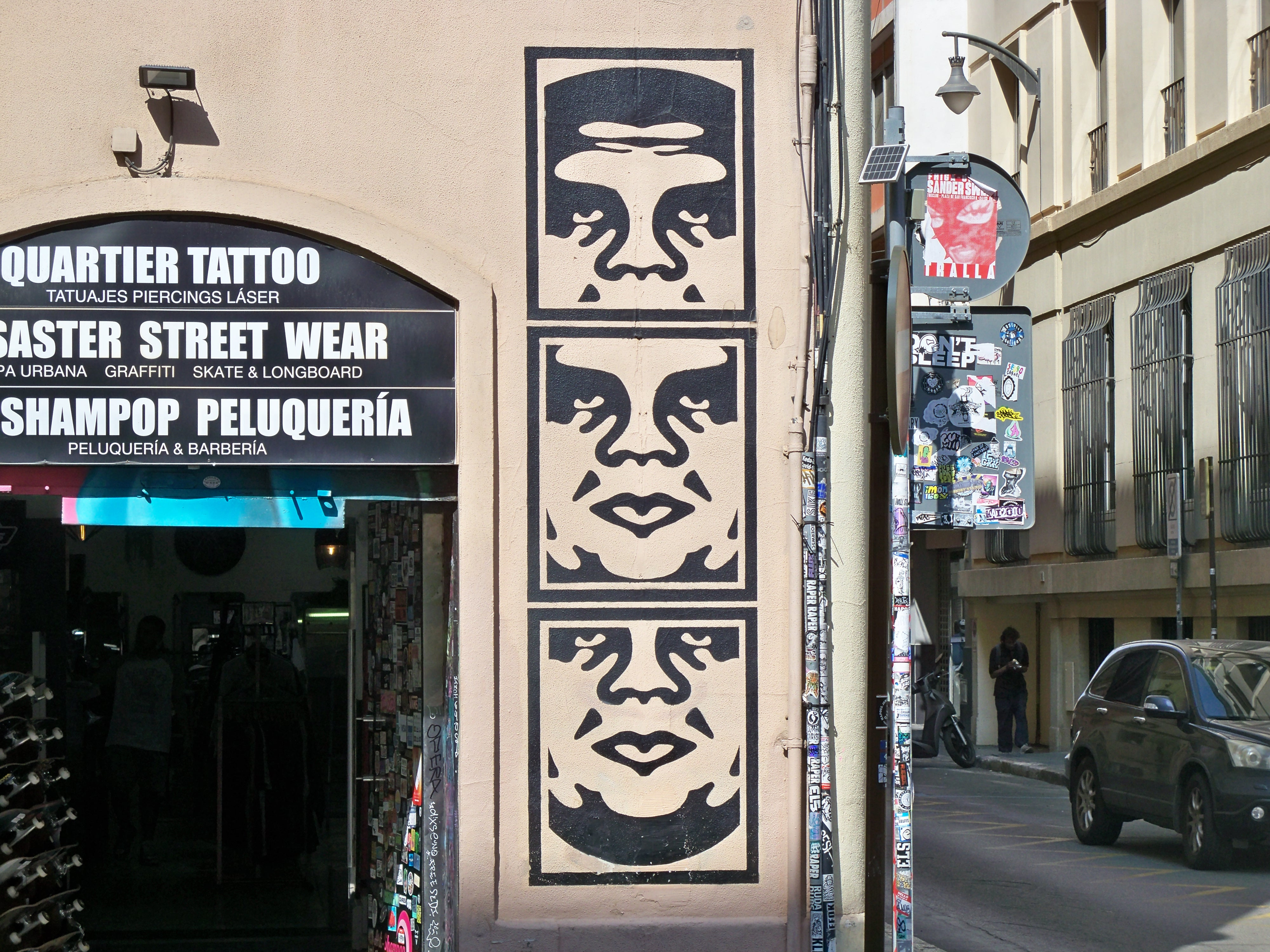
OBEY giant stencil in Málaga, Spain.

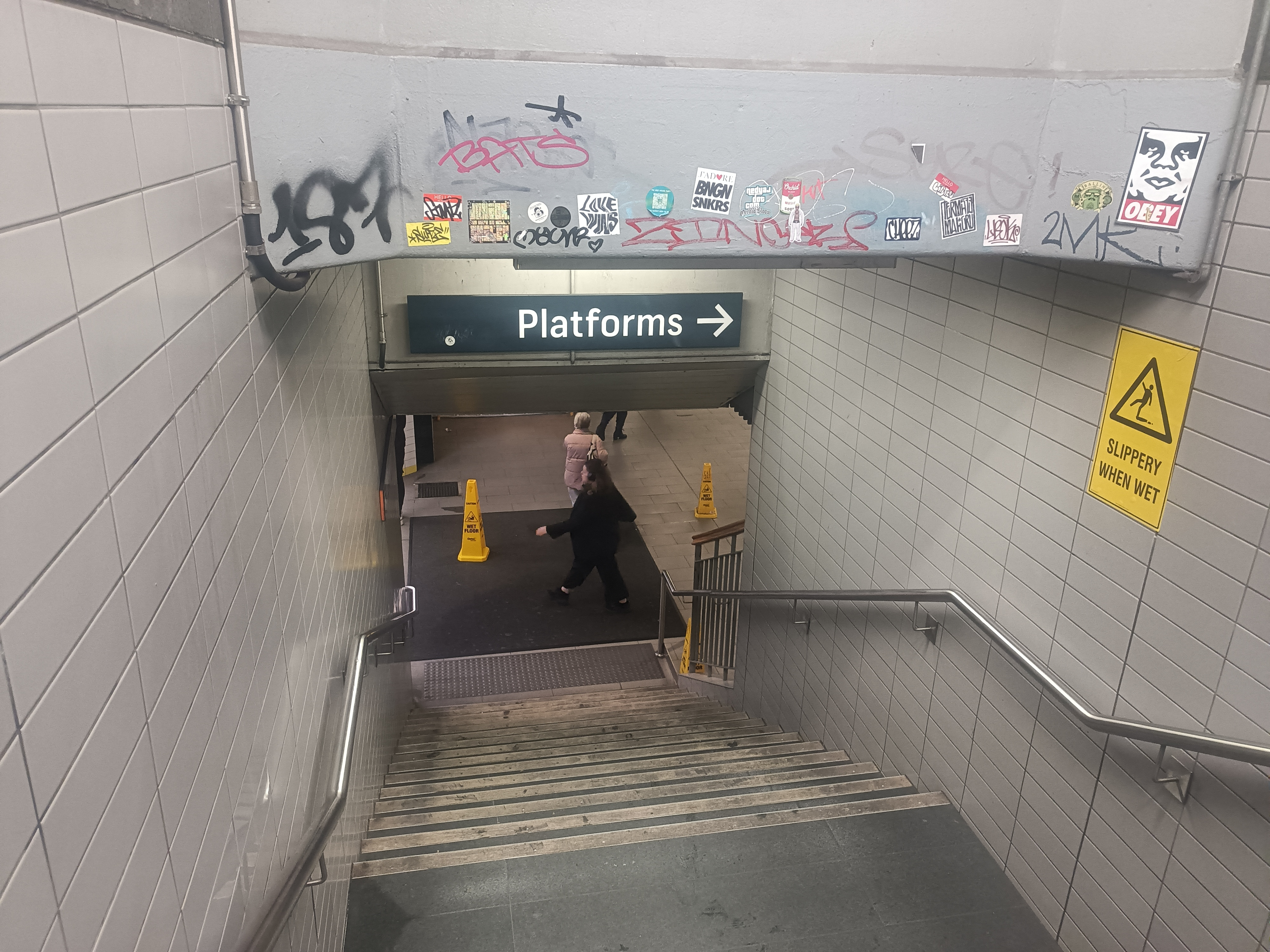
OBEY giant Sticker at an entrance to Town Hall Station, Sydney 2025.

=== Post-graduation ===
After graduation, he founded a small printing business in Providence, Rhode Island, called Alternate Graphics, specializing in T-shirt and sticker silkscreens, which afforded Fairey the ability to continue pursuing his own artwork. While residing in Providence in 1994, Fairey met American filmmaker Helen Stickler, who had also attended RISD and graduated with a film degree. The following spring, Stickler completed a short documentary film about Shepard and his work, titled "Andre the Giant Has a Posse". The film premiered in the 1995 New York Underground Film Festival and went on to play at the 1997 Sundance Film Festival. It has been seen in more than 70 festivals and museums internationally.

"From the late ’90s until about 2001," writes Ken Leighton in The San Diego Reader, Fairey lived in East Village, San Diego, where, according to a friend quoted in the article, he co-founded a "guerrilla marketing company called Black Market Design." According to John Goff, a former member of the San Diego-based "tribal post-punk" industrial-noise performance art band Crash Worship, Fairey began appropriating the Russian Constructivist style utilized in Soviet-era propaganda during his time in San Diego. "'I think he became an art icon when he started focusing on Communist imagery,' Goff says. 'He was still in San Diego then. I first met him when he was working above Hooter’s in the Gaslamp.'"

Mozilla's former logo, as designed by Shepard Fairey in 1998

Fairey was a founding partner, along with Dave Kinsey and Phillip DeWolff, of the design studio BLK/MRKT Inc. from 1997 to 2003, which specialized in guerrilla marketing, and "the development of high-impact marketing campaigns". Clients included Pepsi, Hasbro and Netscape for whom Fairey designed the red dinosaur version of mozilla.org's logo and mascot.

In 2003, he founded the Studio Number One design agency with his wife, Amanda Fairey. The agency produced the cover work for The Black Eyed Peas' album Monkey Business and the poster for the film Walk the Line. Fairey has also designed the covers for The Smashing Pumpkins' album Zeitgeist, Flogging Molly's CD/DVD Whiskey on a Sunday, Led Zeppelin's compilation Mothership and movie Celebration Day, and Anthrax's The Greater Of Two Evils. Along with Banksy, Dmote, and others, Fairey created work at a warehouse exhibition in Alexandria, Sydney, for Semi-Permanent in 2003. Approximately 1,500 people attended.

In 2004, Fairey joined artists Robbie Conal and Mear One to create a series of "anti-war, anti-Bush" posters for a street art campaign called "Be the Revolution" for the art collective "Post Gen". "Be the Revolution" kicked off with a night of performances featuring Z-Trip, Ozomatli, and David J at the Avalon in Hollywood. Fairey also co-founded Swindle Magazine along with Roger Gastman.

In 2005, he collaborated for a second time with Z-Trip on a limited edition 12-inch featuring Chuck D titled "Shock and Awe". In 2005 Fairey also collaborated with DJ Shadow on a box set, with T-shirts, stickers, prints, and a mix CD by Shadow. In 2005 he showed abroad, for instance in Paris at the Magda Danysz Gallery, and was a resident artist at the Honolulu Museum of Art Spalding House (formerly known as The Contemporary Museum, Honolulu). Also in 2005, Fairey contributed the artwork for the posters, cover art, and graphics for Walk The Line, the Johnny Cash biopic. In 2006, Fairey contributed eight vinyl etchings to a limited-edition series of 12" singles by post-punk band Mission of Burma. He has also done work for the musical group Interpol.

In 2006, Fairey joined NYC based Ad agency Project 2050 as founding Creative Director and was featured on the cover of Advertising Age magazine. While at Project 2050, Shepard developed creative work for Virgin Mega Store and Boost Mobile. The book Supply and Demand: The Art of Shepard Fairey was released in 2006. In 2008, Philosophy of Obey (Obey Giant): The Formative Years (1989–2008), edited by Sarah Jaye Williams, was published by Nerve Books UK, and praised by Fairey.

In June 2007, Fairey opened his one-man show titled "E Pluribus Venom" at the Jonathan LeVine Gallery. The show made the arts section front page in the New York Times.

Fairey donated original cover art to the 2008 album Body of War: Songs That Inspired an Iraq War Veteran, produced for Iraq War documentary Body of War. Proceeds from the album benefit non-profit organization Iraq Veterans Against the War.

In 2008, Fairey teamed up again with Z-Trip to do a series of shows in support of then-presidential candidate Barack Obama titled Party For Change. Fairey also designed posters for the British goth band Bauhaus.

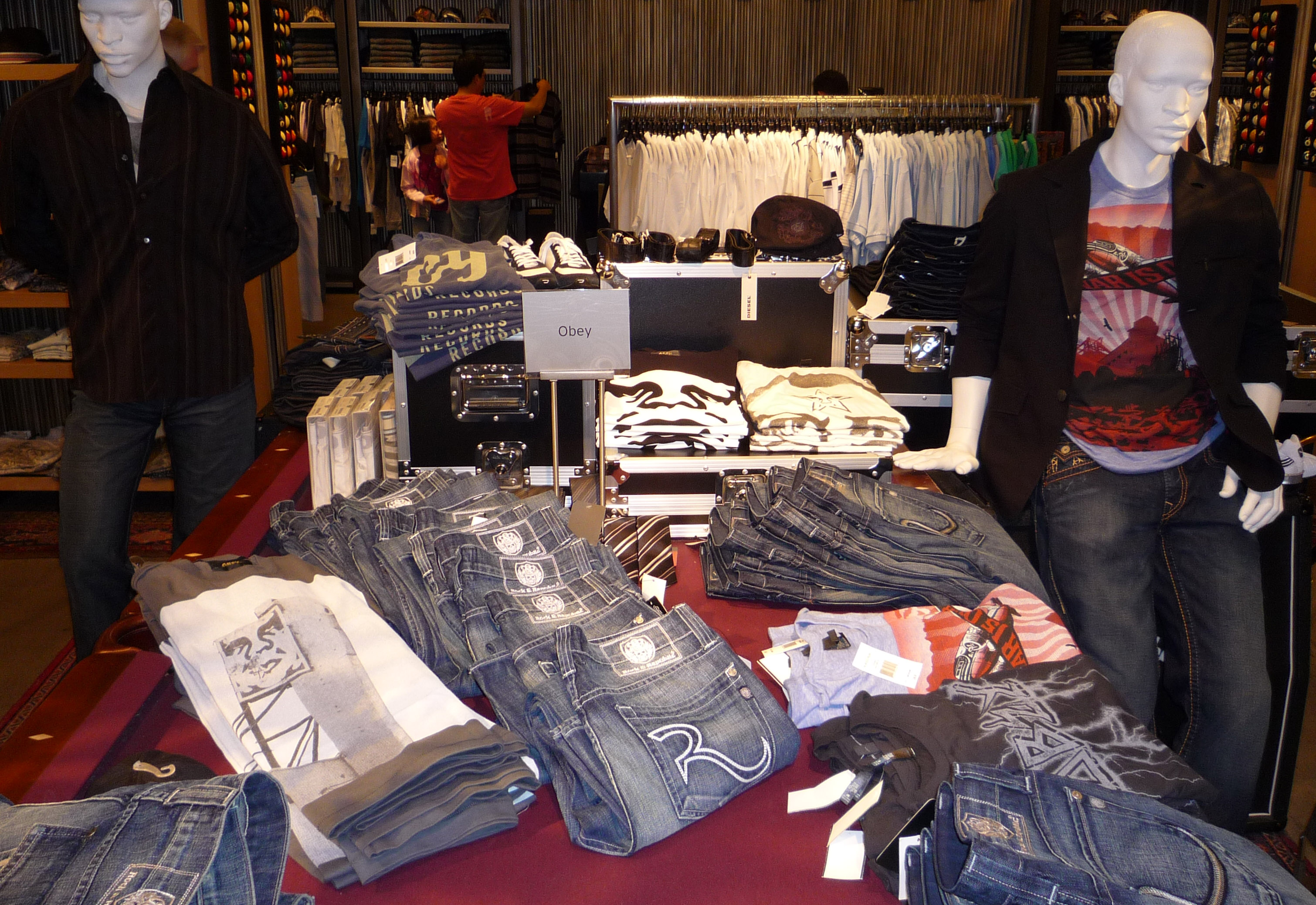
OBEY Giant clothing being sold at Nordstrom department store. San Francisco, California. 2008

In September 2008, Shepard opened his solo show titled "Duality of Humanity" at White Walls & Shooting Gallery in San Francisco. His third solo show with the gallery featured one hundred and fifty works, including the largest collection of his canvas pieces in one show.

Fairey was arrested on February 7, 2009, on his way to the premiere of his show at the Institute of Contemporary Art in Boston, Massachusetts, on two outstanding warrants related to graffiti. He was charged with damage to property for having postered two Boston area locations with graffiti, a Boston Police Department spokesman said. His arrest was announced to partygoers by longtime friend Z-Trip, who had been performing at the ICA premiere at Fairey's request.

On April 27, 2009, Fairey put three signed copies of his Obama inauguration posters up on eBay, with the proceeds of the auction going to the One Love For Chi foundation, founded by the family of Deftones bassist Chi Cheng following a car accident in November 2008 that nearly claimed Cheng's life.

Fairey's first art museum exhibition, titled Supply & Demand (as was his earlier book), was held in Boston at the Institute of Contemporary Art during the summer of 2009. The exhibition featured more than 250 works in a wide variety of media: screen prints, stencils, stickers, rubylith illustrations, collages, and works on wood, metal, and canvas. As a complement to the ICA exhibition, Fairey created public art works around Boston. The artist explains his driving motivation: "The real message behind most of my work is 'question everything'."

In 2011, Time Magazine commissioned Fairey to design its cover to honor "The Protester" as Person of the Year in the wake of the Arab Spring, Occupy Wall Street, and other social movements around the world. This was Fairey's second Person of the Year cover for Time, his first being of Barack Obama in 2008.

In January 2015, Shepard Fairey made a cameo appearance on Portlandia. In July 2015, Fairey was arrested and detained at Los Angeles International Airport, after passing through customs, on a warrant for allegedly vandalizing 14 buildings in Detroit. He subsequently turned himself in to Detroit Police.

On September 17, 2015, the Jacob Lewis Gallery presented Shepard Fairey's exhibition "On Our Hands", his first solo opening in New York City in five years. The paintings reflect on contemporary issues facing the global community: political corruption, environmental apathy, and abuse of power. The exhibition coincides with Fairey's new monograph Covert to Overt, published by Rizzoli.

Life Is Beautiful Fremont East District, Las Vegas Mural Project 2016.

=== Barack Obama "Hope" poster ===
Fairey created a series of posters supporting Barack Obama's 2008 candidacy for President of the United States, including the iconic "HOPE" portrait. The New Yorker art critic Peter Schjeldahl called the poster "the most efficacious American political illustration since 'Uncle Sam Wants You'". Fairey also created an exclusive design for Rock the Vote. Because the Hope poster had been "perpetuated illegally" and independently by the street artist, the Obama campaign declined to have any direct affiliation with it. Although the campaign officially disavowed any involvement in the creation or popularization of the poster, Fairey has commented in interviews that he was in communication with campaign officials during the period immediately following the poster's release. Fairey has stated that the original version featured the word "PROGRESS" instead of the word "HOPE", and that within weeks of its release, the campaign requested that he issue (and legally disseminate) a new version, keeping the powerful image of Obama's face but captioning it with the word "HOPE". The campaign openly embraced the revised poster along with two additional Fairey posters that featured the words "CHANGE" and "VOTE".

Fairey distributed 300,000 stickers and 500,000 posters during the campaign, funding his grassroots electioneering through poster and fine art sales. "I just put all that money back into making more stuff, so I didn't keep any of the Obama money", explained Fairey in December 2009.

In February 2008, Fairey received a letter of thanks from Obama for his contribution to the campaign. The letter stated:

I would like to thank you for using your talent in support of my campaign. The political messages involved in your work have encouraged Americans to believe they can change the status quo. Your images have a profound effect on people, whether seen in a gallery or on a stop sign. I am privileged to be a part of your artwork and proud to have your support. I wish you continued success and creativity.– Barack Obama, February 22, 2008

On November 5, 2008, Chicago posted banners throughout the downtown business district featuring Fairey's Obama "HOPE" portrait.

Fairey created a similar but new image of Barack Obama for Time magazine, which was used as the cover art for the 2008 Person of the Year issue. The original iconic "HOPE" portrait was featured on the cover of Esquire Magazine's February 2009 issue, this time with a caption reading, "WHAT NOW?" Fairey's influence throughout the presidential election was a factor in the artist himself having been named a Person of the Year for 2008 by GQ.

Shepard Fairey, Obama Hope Gold (from the Artists for Obama portfolio) 2008, serigraph, edition of 300, 14" × 10¼" (36 × 26 cm)

In October 2008, Fairey created a small edition of serigraphs titled Obama Hope Gold (from Artists for Obama). This portfolio was produced through a partnership between Gemini G.E.L. printing studio and the Democratic National Committee. The project supported the presidential campaign of Barack Obama. The Gold serigraphs are the third and final edition of Fairey’s Hope prints of the president. The edition was released shortly after the Inauguration. An example of this work is in the permanent collection of the Museum of Modern Art, New York.

In January 2009, the "HOPE" portrait was acquired by the U.S. National Portrait Gallery and made part of its permanent collection. It was unveiled and put on display on January 17, 2009.

Also in January 2009, photographer and blogger Tom Gralish discovered that the poster was based on an Associated Press photograph by freelance photographer Mannie Garcia. Fairey subsequently filed suit in the U. S. District Court for the Southern District of New York against the Associated Press, seeking a declaratory judgment that his use of the AP photograph was protected by the fair use doctrine. Fairey subsequently admitted that he had based the poster on the AP photograph and had fabricated and destroyed evidence to hide the fact. Judge Alvin K. Hellerstein urged a settlement, stating that AP would win the case. The AP and Fairey settled out of court in January 2011. In 2012, Fairey pleaded guilty to one count of criminal contempt of court for his destruction of evidence and submission of false images to the court, and was sentenced by U.S. magistrate judge Frank Maas of the Southern District of New York to two years' probation and a $25,000 fine.

In 2009, Fairey's Obama portrait was featured in the book Art For Obama: Designing Manifest Hope and the Campaign for Change, which Fairey also edited.

In his December 8, 2010, appearance on The Colbert Report, Stephen Colbert asked Fairey how he felt about having done the "HOPE" portrait of Obama and how "that hope was working out for him now?" to which Fairey replied: "You know, I'm proud of it as a piece of grassroots activism, but I'll just leave it at that".

In an interview with Esquire in 2015, Fairey said that Obama had not lived up to his expectations, "not even close". He continued, "Obama has had a really tough time, but there have been a lot of things that he's compromised on that I never would have expected. I mean, drones and domestic spying are the last things I would have thought [he'd support]."

Fairey created a mutt version of the red, white, and blue poster, donating it to help support pet adoptions, from an image of a rescued shaggy dog taken by photographer Clay Myers. Four hundred limited edition prints were offered by Adopt-A-Pet.com, a nonprofit organization that helps shelters, humane societies, and rescue groups advertise their homeless pets to potential adopters. The poster, which was also offered as a free download, was featured on the cover of the spring 2009 edition of Dog’s Life magazine.

=== The Mandela mural ===
In 2014, Fairey painted a towering mural, 9 stories high, paying tribute to Nelson Mandela and the 25th anniversary of the Purple Rain Protest. It is a public artwork on Juta Street in Braamfontein, Johannesburg, overlooking the Nelson Mandela Bridge.

=== Honest Gil Fulbright ===
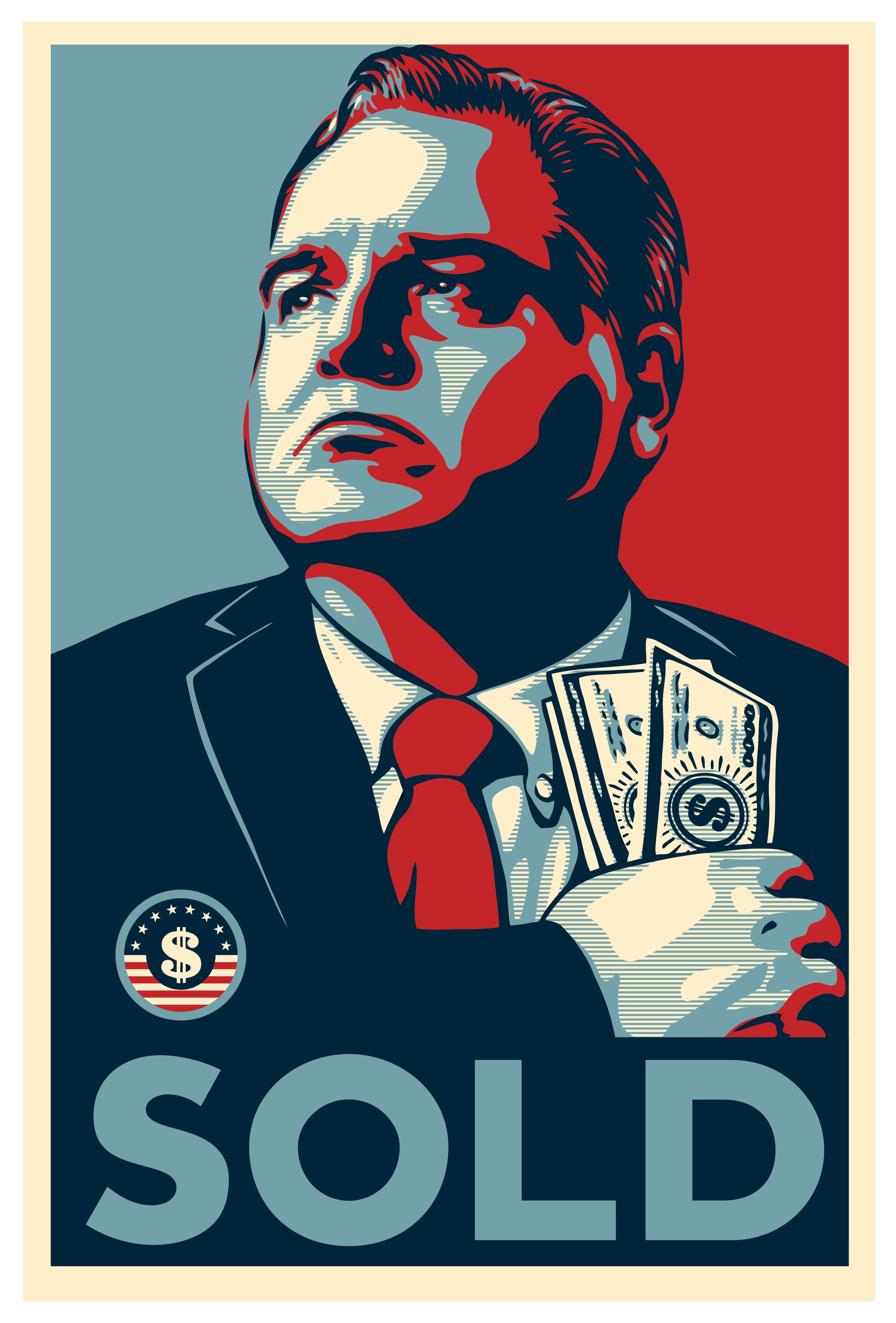
Honest Gil Fulbright SOLD Poster

Fairey created an adaptation of the Obama HOPE poster for satirical Kentucky politician Honest Gil Fulbright. Frank L. Ridley, the actor who portrays Fulbright, is featured on the poster, along with the word "SOLD", which refers to Fulbright's "honest" political message: "I'm only in this thing for the money, but at least I'm honest about it."

=== Marianne ===
As a tribute to the victims of the November 2015 Paris attacks, Fairey created a poster representing Marianne, the French national icon, surrounded by the national motto Liberté, égalité, fraternité. In June 2016, this design was painted as a mural on 186 rue Nationale, Paris. Fairey made a gift of the poster to Emmanuel Macron, who hung it in his office upon assuming the presidency of France.
In the night of the 13 December (Note: The day, 13/12, is known as an anti-police day to French activists, as it is a code for A.C.A.B.) 2020, an anonymous group tagged over the mural in an act of protest against the state. The motto was crossed out with white paint and replaced by the tag Marianne pleure (Marianne cries), and red tears were added to the face of Marianne. Fairey reacted to the act by declaring his support for all who protest against injustice and that he understood the goals of the action.

=== We the People series ===
This series was made during the 2016 presidential campaign as a protest of Donald Trump's declarations and policies. This work aims to promote gender equality and fights discrimination against minorities. This work stands out to many as it provokes people to respect their common humanity. The title of the work comes from a line in the U.S. Constitution, and it features portraits of Native Americans, African Americans, Muslims, and Latinas, aiming to defend their dignity.

=== Make Art Not War ===
This work is a mural for Urban Nation in Berlin, Germany. The street art was created in 2014 by Fairey. The work became a motto for street artists and demonstrated Fairey's political support for anti-war movements and peace. The work was made like traditional street art with spray paint and features many of Fairey's motifs and symbols from other works. This repetition includes the black and red cartoon-like style with repetition of symbols such as roses.

=== Kamala Harris "Forward" poster ===
Fairey created a poster supporting Kamala Harris' 2024 candidacy for President of the United States. Writing on Instagram, he said, "We have a very real opportunity to move forward," citing a desire for "a healthy planet, for corporate accountability, toward equality and away from racism, sexism, xenophobia, and homophobia, for equitable access to opportunity, for full access to the medical care we want or need, for fair and just immigration policies." Like his previous work on the Barack Obama HOPE poster, he was not paid to create this work.

== Major public murals, commissions ==
- Peace Elephant (2011), West Hollywood Library, Los Angeles, California
- Purple Project (2014), Johannesburg, South Africa
- Liberté, Égalité, Fraternité (2016), Paris, France
- Welcome Home (2017), Costa Mesa, California
- Defend Dignity (2019), Los Angeles, California
- We Shape The Future Rose Shackle (2019), London
- Voting Rights Are Human Rights (2020), Milwaukee, WI
- These Sunsets Are To Die For (2022), Munich, Germany
- Peace Guard (2017/2023), Lisbon, Portugal
- A Mosaic of Peace and Harmony (2023), Singapore

== Activism and humanitarianism ==
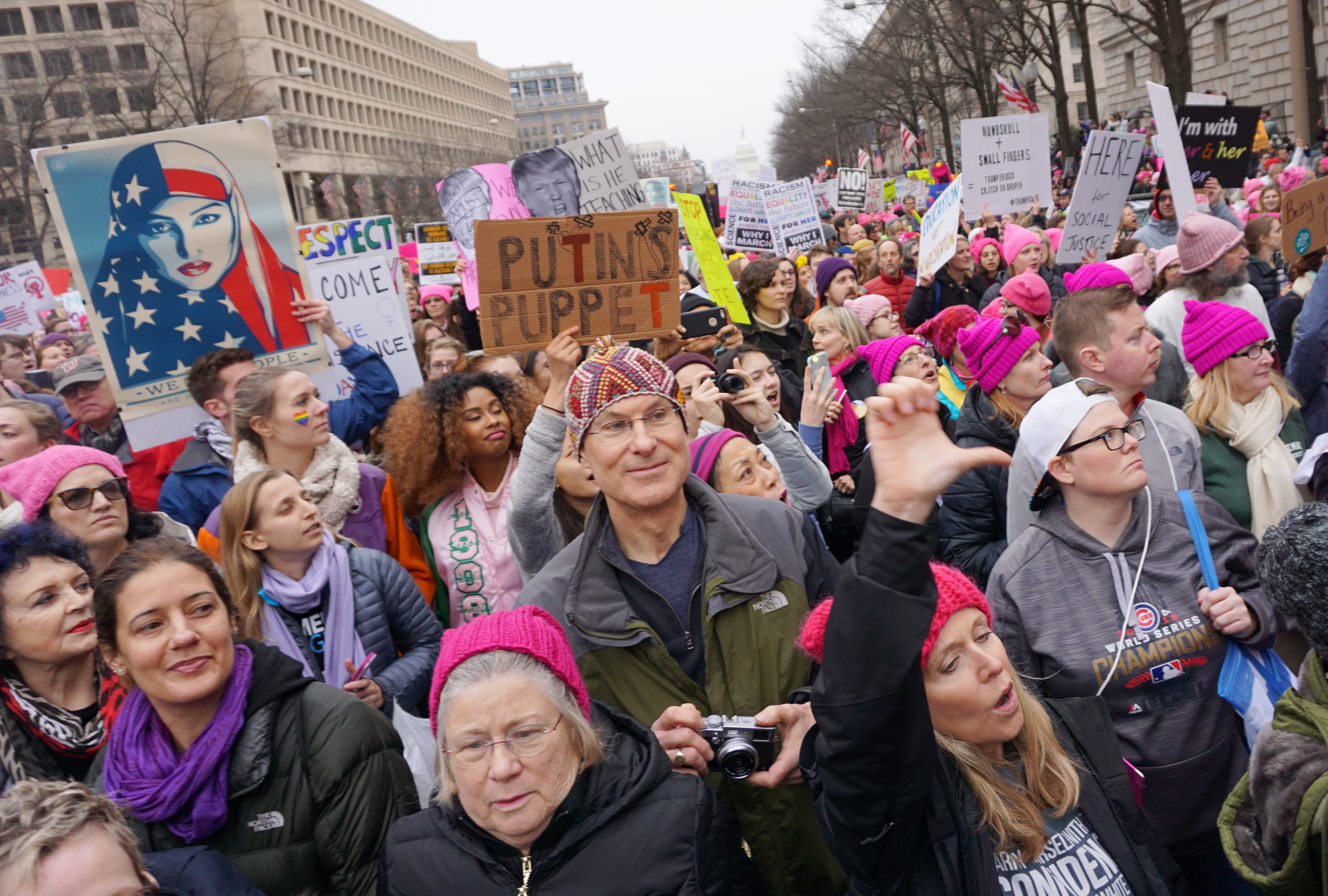
A 2016 poster by Fairey, shown during the 2017 Women's March, depicts a Muslim-American woman

In the early 2000s, Fairey began donating to organizations such as Chiapas Relief Fund, the ACLU, Feeding America, and the Art of Elysium. Following the Obama campaign, Fairey donated proceeds from these poster sales to the ACLU and Feeding America. In September 2010, Fairey created a poster for the ACLU with actress Olivia Wilde as the Statue of Liberty holding a megaphone and a clipboard, the ACLU's weapons of choice.

The Obey Awareness Program, operated by Obey Clothing, was founded in 2007 as an extension of Fairey's humanitarian efforts. This program allows Fairey to support causes he believes in by selling specially designed merchandise and donating 100% of the profits raised to handpicked organizations and their causes. Past non-profit organizations benefiting from this program include Hope for Darfur, 11th Hour Action, Feed America, earthquake relief in Haiti, Dark Wave / Rising Sun for Japan relief, and Adopt-a-Pet.com. Environmentally related non-profit organizations such as the Surfrider Foundation, Urban Roots, the Alaskan Wildlife Refuge and more also received donations. The latest Obey Awareness T-shirts benefitted the Go Campaign, an organization that improves the lives of orphans and vulnerable children around the world by partnering with local heroes to deliver local solutions.

Fairey sits on the advisory board of Reaching to Embrace the Arts, a nonprofit organization that provides art supplies to disadvantaged schools and students. In 2007, Fairey was commissioned to create a logo for "Music Is Revolution Foundation" and became a board member of the Music Is Revolution Foundation, a nonprofit organization that supports music education for students in public schools.

As a type 1 diabetic, Fairey often contributes to non-profit organizations assisting in medical research. He is one of the earliest supporters of Give to Cure, a non-profit organization devoted to accelerating the process of finding cures for human diseases. Fairey created the first Give To Cure sticker series with 20 distinct designs. In addition, he created three special edition prints to commemorate the inaugural Give To Cure campaign. In January 2012, Fairey created an exclusive print called "The Cure" for the Juvenile Diabetes Research Foundation (JDRF), the leading global organization funding type 1 diabetes research. All proceeds from the sale went to the JDRF. In June 2013, a feature documentary called The Human Trial about the quest to cure type 1 diabetes caught the attention of Fairey, who then created the movie poster to raise funds for the film.

Every year since 2009, Fairey has contributed his art to raise funds for the RUSH Philanthropic Arts Foundation. In August 2011, Fairey donated the Buddhist inspired piece Mandala Ornament (valued at $12,000) to help raise funds for the Foundation through the ART FOR LIFE online auction, the primary annual fundraising effort that helps support thousands of underserved New York children. Proceeds from the annual gala and auction benefitted the Foundation's signature arts education and gallery programs, which directly serve 2,300 students each year.

In June 2009, Fairey created a poster in support of the plight of Aung San Suu Kyi to bring awareness to the human rights cause in Burma. The proceeds from this print benefitted the Human Rights Action Center and the U.S. Campaign for Burma.

In 2009, Fairey teamed up with artist and activist Ernesto Yerena, activist Marco Amador, and musician Zack de la Rocha of Rage Against the Machine to create, distribute, and sell posters countering dehumanizing and anti-immigrant rhetoric for the We Are Human Campaign. A majority of the proceeds went to the National Day Labor Organizing Network (NDLON) and Puente, a grassroots community group that fights for human dignity.

Fairey has also created artwork to benefit the David Lynch Foundation for Consciousness-Based Education and World Peace (DLF). In April 2009, Fairey created a poster for the David Lynch Foundation's "Change Begins Within" benefit concert. In April 2011, Fairey donated unique collector's items to the foundation's "Download for Good" campaign. In April 2015, Fairey created a commemorative poster for the 10-year anniversary of the music of David Lynch, with all proceeds from poster sales going to the foundation.

In November 2009, Fairey partnered with LGBT grassroots organization FAIR to auction "Defend Equality Love Unites" posters to raise awareness and funds for the fight for gay and lesbian marriage equality.

Fairey is a supporter of artist movements such as The Art of Elysium, an organization aiming to affect social change by making art available to striving artists and young people battling serious illnesses. In August 2010, Fairey donated one original Burmese Monk fine art piece as well as an opportunity for a live portrait sitting for Art of Elysium. In September 2014, Fairey curated The Art of Elysium's GENESIS showcase of emerging L.A. artists, creatives, tastemakers, and social leaders.

In May 2010, Fairey partnered with Feeding America and The Advertising Council to create an outdoor public service advertisement to raise awareness about domestic hunger.

In 2011, Fairey was named honorary chair of the Young Literati, a philanthropic group of the Library Foundation of Los Angeles. Fairey has created artwork and curated several Young Literati Annual Toast events benefitting the Library Foundation. Fairey's wife Amanda has held the position of chair of the Library Foundation since 2013.

In December 2011, Fairey contributed to the Robert Rauschenberg Foundation's inaugural "Artist as Activist" print project to benefit the Coalition for the Homeless. Fairey created an original print called "The Future is Unwritten" to commemorate Rauschenburg's dedication to important social issues and the mission of the Coalition for the Homeless. The print was sold on Artnet to raise more than $150,000 to support the Coalition's life-saving programs.

In July 2013, Fairey did a public arts project for the nonprofit L.A. Fund for Education. Fairey's design titled "Create Your Future" was one of three installments in the #ArtsMatter campaign, which was a collaborative effort with P.S. ARTS and featured the art displayed on billboards and buses across the city of Los Angeles to send the message that arts matter in schools. Again in 2015, Fairey contributed to P.S. Arts, and collaborated with Marc Phillips Decorative Rugs to create a one-of-kind rug for a benefit auction for P.S. Arts.

In March 2014, Fairey created a portrait of Ai Weiwei with "Friends of Ai Weiwei", a group of Ai Weiwei's supporters who were trying to promote awareness of the artist's legal status in China, where authorities had confiscated his passport. Proceeds from the posters went toward Friends of Ai Weiwei's efforts to help the artist and to promote free speech. The following year Ai Weiwei was granted a visa, reversing a decision not to grant him the travel document.

Fairey has also created works to support school safety, and posters with his art were seen at the March for Our Lives rally in Washington, D.C., on March 24, 2018.

Street art is characterized by a nonpermissive art method of production, which reveals the rebellious nature and activism that challenges the viewer's perspective regarding the surrounding environment. Street art has features that distinguish it from other art forms such as graffiti and public art. The defiant nature of the art form itself reveals the defiant structure of Fairey's art and the political challenge it has on others.

On October 3, 2026, Fairey performed a DJ set at the Power to the People Festival at Merriweather Post Pavilion in Columbia, MD. The festival, which is being put on by Tom Morello, will also feature performances by Morello, Bruce Springsteen, Foo Fighters and many others. The festival is being held in response to President Donald Trump.

== Legal issues ==
Fairey has been criticized for failing to obtain permission and to provide attribution for works he used. Fairey has also threatened to sue other artists for doing the same. Austin, Texas based graphic designer Baxter Orr created his own take on Fairey's work in a piece called Protect, with the iconic Obey Giant face covered by a SARS respiratory mask. Orr marketed the prints as his own work. On April 23, 2008, Orr received a cease-and-desist order from Fairey's attorneys, telling him to stop selling Protect because it violated Fairey's trademark. Fairey threatened to sue, calling Orr a "parasite".

In 2015 Fairey was charged with destruction of property for tagging 18 posters at unsanctioned sites. The case was later dismissed.

=== Barack Obama HOPE poster lawsuit ===
Fairey's HOPE poster was based on one of several photos of then-Senator Barack Obama taken by photographer Mannie Garcia on assignment for the Associated Press at a press conference in April 2006. The AP determined that it owned the photo's copyright and demanded compensation for the work. Fairey said his use of the photograph fell within the legal definition of fair use. Fairey claims he used pieces of the photo as raw material to create a "heroic and inspirational" political portrait, the aesthetic of which was fundamentally different from the original photo. Lawyers for both sides tried to reach an amicable agreement.

In February 2009, Fairey filed a federal lawsuit against the Associated Press, seeking a declaratory judgment that his use of the AP photograph was protected by the fair use doctrine and did not infringe their copyright. Originally, Fairey had claimed that photo he had used as the basis of the poster was of Obama seated next to George Clooney, and that he had cropped the actor out of the shot and made other changes. However, in October 2009, Fairey admitted he had actually used a close-up shot of Obama, also taken by Garcia, as the AP had long alleged, and that he had tried to deceive the Court by destroying evidence that proved this. The solo photo appears much more similar to the final HOPE poster than the photo of Obama and Clooney. Following that admission, Fairey's lawyers announced they no longer represented him. Laurence Pulgram, an intellectual property lawyer, stated that the revelation put Fairey's case in trouble.

In May 2010, a judge urged Fairey to settle. The parties settled in January 2011. On February 24, 2012, Fairey pleaded guilty to criminal contempt of court for "destroying documents and manufacturing evidence." On September 7, 2012, Fairey was sentenced to 300 hours of community service, ordered to pay a $25,000 federal fine, and was placed on probation for two years.

The AP argued that Fairey knew of the true identity of the reference work even before filing his initial complaint. Fairey contends that he did not know the identity of the photographer when he created the poster and that he was initially unaware that the close-up photo of Obama was a separate image, mistakenly thinking it was merely a cropped version of the photo with Clooney. He claims that this misrepresentation was an honest mistake, which he only learned of in the middle of the litigation. However he also acknowledged that his attempted cover up was "an egregious error in judgement", and that he was wrong to not have immediately notified his counsel.

Garcia, the photographer, believes that he personally owns the copyright for the photo, and has said, "If you put all the legal stuff away, I’m so proud of the photograph and that Fairey did what he did artistically with it, and the effect it's had".

== Writing ==
In 2024, Shepard Fairey wrote the afterword to Iggy and The Stooges: The Authorized Biography by authorized Alice Cooper biographer Jeffrey Morgan.

== Critical response ==
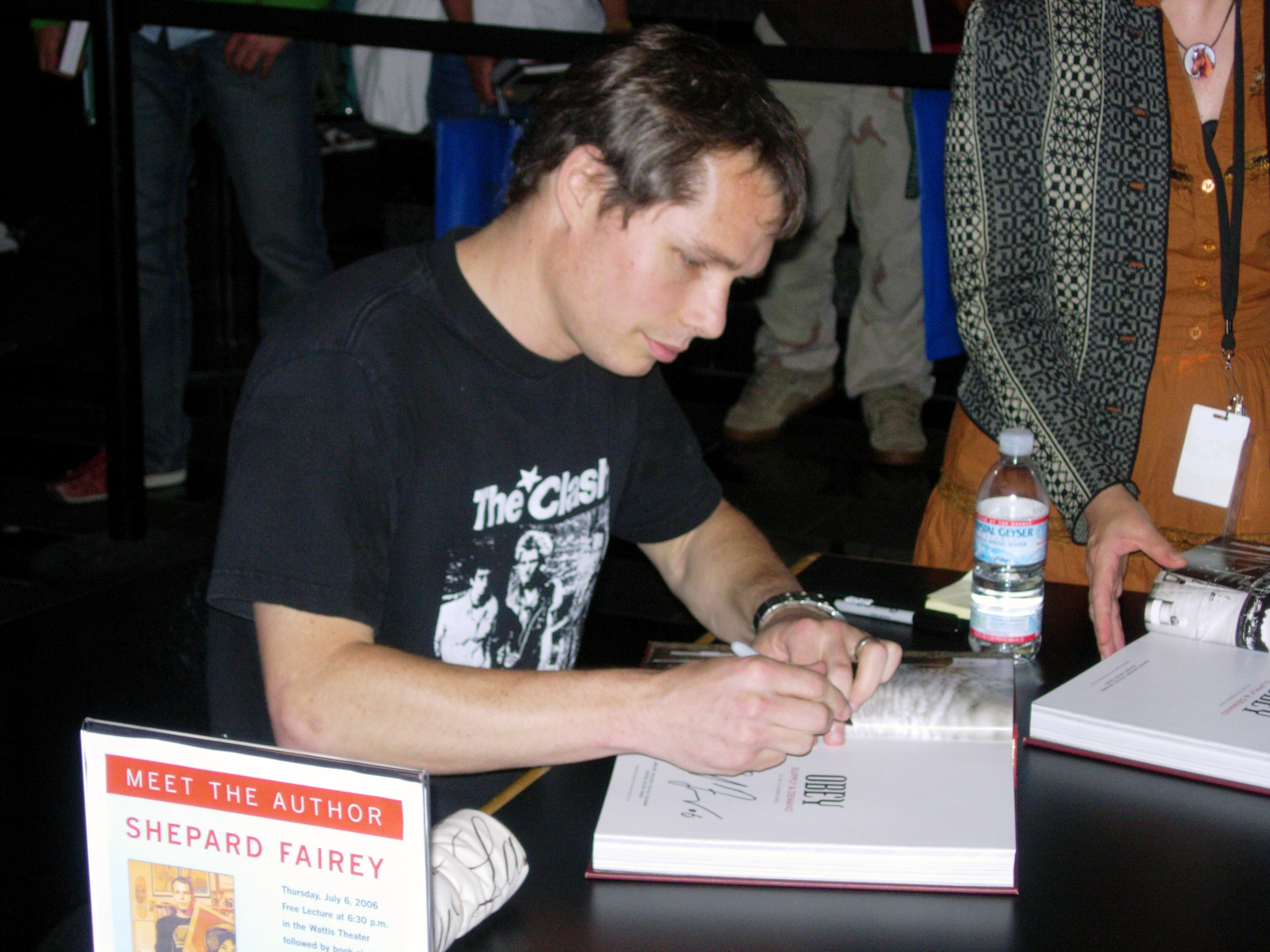
Shepard Fairey at a book signing for Supply & Demand: The Art of Shepard Fairey

Liam O'Donoghue interviewed Fairey for Mother Jones and questioned the artist about criticism related to his use of images from social movements, specifically images created by black artists. O'Donoghue later posted an article, titled "Shepard Fairey’s Image Problem", on several independent media sites. O' Donoghue explored Fairey's use of copyright-protected images while defending his own copyright-protected works from being used by other artists and corporations. Fairey cited his collaboration with Public Enemy, his funding of the Zapatista Army of National Liberation, and his six-figure charitable contributions for Darfur assistance as responses to charges of exploitation:

"I challenge anybody to fuck with that, know what I mean", Fairey stated. "It's not like I'm just jumping on some cool rebel cause for the sake of exploiting it for profit. People like to talk shit, but it's usually to justify their own apathy. I don't want to demean anyone's struggles through casual appropriation of something powerful; that's not my intention."

Erick Lyle has accused Fairey of cynically turning graffiti culture into a self-promoting advertising campaign. On the other hand, San Diego Union-Tribune art critic Robert L. Pincus says Fairey's work "is political art with a strong sense of visual style and emotional authenticity. Even in times when political art has ebbed, Fairey's has just the right balance of seriousness, irony and wit to fit the mood of the moment". The Walrus contributor Nick Mount wrote "Following the example set by gallery art, some street art is more about the concept than the art. 'Fuck Bush' isn’t an aesthetic; it’s an ethic. Shepard Fairey’s Obey Giant stickers and Akay’s Akayism posters are clever children of Duchamp, ironic conceptual art." But Stephen Heller of The New York Times suggested that Fairey's political art has similarities to political art from the past, for instance to political art created by Andy Warhol.

In a New York Times review of "E Pluribus Venom" at Jonathan LeVine Gallery, art critic Benjamin Genocchio described Fairey's art as "generic" despite the range of mediums and styles used by the artist. Genocchio went on to say that it was tempting to see Fairey's art as just another luxury commodity.

Andrew Michael Ford, the director of Ad Hoc Art, said that Fairey's practice does not "match up" in the minds of people who view his work. Ford suggests that some people will view Fairey's work as "very commercial". In his comments, he suggested that Fairey is "ripe" for criticism because he profits from politically and socially charged works. Ford stated that, despite his criticism, he is a fan of Fairey's work.

Artists Mark Vallen, Lincoln Cushing, Josh MacPhee, and Favianna Rodriguez have documented that Fairey has appropriated work by Koloman Moser, Ralph Chaplin, Pirkle Jones, Rupert Garcia, Rene Mederos, Félix Beltrán, and Gary Grimshaw, among others. In his critique, "Obey Plagiarist Shepard Fairey", Vallen dissects various works by Fairey, demonstrating them to be plagiarized from the work of other artists. Jamie O'Shea criticizes Vallen's approach for a "nearly ubiquitous lack of understanding of the artist’s use of appropriated imagery in his work and the longstanding historical precedent for this mode of creative expression," in addition to being masked in a thin "veneer of obvious envy in most cases".

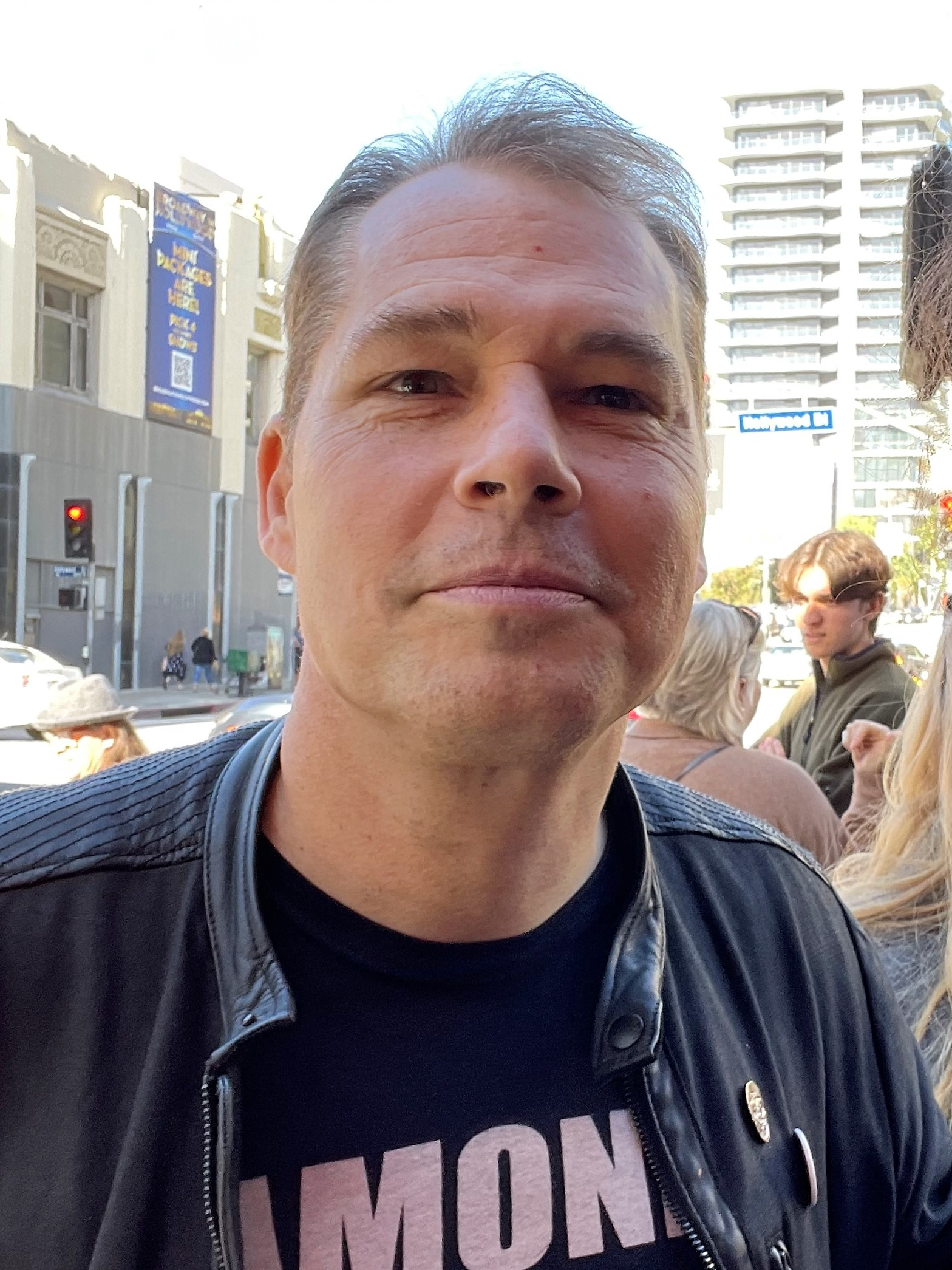
Fairey in 2023

Art critic Brian Sherwin lashed out at O’Shea's criticism of Mark Vallen by saying that O’Shea's SUPERTOUCH article was nothing more than "damage control". Sherwin questioned O’Shea's defense of Fairey, noting that Fairey is a SUPERTOUCH author and business associate of O’Shea. Sherwin suggests that O’Shea has a "vested" interest in making sure that Fairey is viewed positively by the public since he has curated art exhibits involving Fairey and has written extensively about the artist. Sherwin wrote that O’Shea once served as editor in chief for Juxtapoz and has worked as a creative director hired by corporate art collections as a corporate liaison for acquisitions. Sherwin concluded that the public will "question the artist who says to question everything," regardless of O’Shea's Mark Vallen "damage control" on SUPERTOUCH. Sherwin implied that O'Shea's critique of Vallen was selective because key negative facts about Fairey's history were left out in the article. The dispute between Sherwin and O’Shea was cited by Dan Wasserman on The Boston Globe’s "Out of Line".

Bloggers have criticized Fairey for accepting commissions from corporations such as Saks Fifth Avenue, for which his design agency produced illustrations inspired by Constructivism and Alexander Rodchenko. Fairey defends his corporate commissions by saying that clients such as Saks Fifth Avenue help him to keep his studio operational and his assistants employed. Fairey has acknowledged the irony of being a street artist exploring themes of free speech while at the same time being an artist hired by corporations for consumer campaigns. He says simply that designers and artists have to make money to survive:

"I consider myself a populist artist," Fairey says. "I want to reach people through as many different platforms as possible. Street art is a bureaucracy-free way of reaching people, but T-shirts, stickers, commercial jobs, the Internet – there are so many different ways that I use to put my work in front of people."

In August 2011, Fairey received a black eye and a bruised rib after being attacked outside of the Kodboderne 18 nightclub in Copenhagen, Denmark. Fairey claims the two assailants called him "Obama illuminati" and ordered him to "go back to America". He believes the attack was the result of a misunderstanding over his artwork, which commemorated the demolition of the legendary Ungdomshuset (youth house) at Jagtvej 69. His mural showed a peace dove in flight surrounded by a circle of Tønder lace above the word "Peace"; it was vandalized within 24 hours of its unveiling with graffiti slogans "no peace" and "go home, Yankee hipster".

The media reported that the artwork was commissioned by the Copenhagen Municipality, but the original mural was organized by Fairey's Copenhagen gallery, V1. It was not a government-sponsored work.

== Exhibitions ==
=== Selected solo exhibitions ===
- 2000: Obey Giant, Anno Domini Gallery, San Jose, CA
- 2002: Overnight Delivery, BLK/MRKT Gallery, Culver City, CA
- 2002: Shepard Fairey, Kinsey/DesForges Gallery, Culver City, CA
- 2003: This is Your God, sixspace Gallery, Los Angeles, CA
- 2004: Obey, V1 Gallery, Copenhagen
- 2004: Supply and Demand, Merry Karnowsky Gallery – LA, Los Angeles, CA
- 2005: Manufacturing Dissent, Merry Karnowsky Gallery – LA, Los Angeles, CA
- 2005: Shepard Fairey, Honolulu Museum of Art, Honolulu, HI
- 2006: Obey, Magda Danysz Gallery, Paris, France
- 2006: Rise Above, Merry Karnowsky Gallery - LA, Los Angeles, CA
- 2007: E Pluribus Venom, Jonathan LeVine Gallery, New York, NY
- 2007: Ninteeneightyfouria, Stolenspace Gallery, London
- 2007: Imperfect Union, Merry Karnowsky Gallery – LA, Los Angeles, CA
- 2009: Supply & Demand, ICA – Institute of Contemporary Art Boston, Boston, MA
- 2009: Shepard Fairey, National Portrait Gallery, Canberra, ACT
- 2009: Supply & Demand, The Andy Warhol Museum, Pittsburgh, PA
- 2010: Supply and Demand, CAC – Cincinnati Contemporary Arts Center, Cincinnati, OH
- 2010: May Day, Deitch Projects – 76 Grand Street, New York, NY
- 2011: Revolutions – The Album Cover Art Of Shepard Fairey, Robert Berman Gallery, Santa Monica, CA
- 2012: Sound & Vision, Stolenspace Gallery, London
- 2015: On Our Hands, Jacob Lewis Gallery, New York, NY
- 2015: Sid Superman is Dead : Shepard Fairey et Denis Morris, Magda Danysz Gallery, Paris, France
- 2015: Your Eyes Here, CAC Centro de Arte Contemporáneo de Málaga, Málaga
- 2016: Victory is Peace – Shepard Fairey x NoNÅME, Positive-Propaganda Artspace, Munich, Germany
- 2017: Shepard Fairey: Work Against The Clampdown, Art Museum of West Virginia University, Morgantown, WV
- 2018: Shepard Fairey: Salad Days, 1989–1999, Cranbrook Art Museum, Bloomfield, Hills, MI
- 2019: Retrospective Shepard Fairey, (600 works for Grenoble Street Art Fest), Grenoble, France
- 2021: Future Mosaic, Opera Gallery, Dubai
- 2022: New Clear Power, Amuseum of Contemporary Art, Munich
- 2023: Backward Forward, Dallas Contemporary, Texas
- 2023: Shepard Fairey: ICONS, Subliminal Projects, Los Angeles, CA
- 2024: Photo Synthesis, Fotografiska Stockholm, Sweden
- 2024: Photo Synthesis, Fotografiska Tallinn, Estonia
- 2025: Photo Synthesis, Fotografiska Berlin, Germany
- 2025: Fractured, Harman Projects, San Francisco, CA
- 2026: OBEY: Power to the peaceful. Palazzo del Banco di Napoli, Napoli, Italy.

=== Selected group exhibitions ===
- 1999: Sticker Shock: Artists, ICA – Institute of Contemporary Art – University of Pennsylvania, Philadelphia, PA
- 2003: Beautiful Losers, CAC – Cincinnati Contemporary Arts Center, Cincinnati, OH
- 2004: Backjumps – The Live Issue #1, Kunstraum Kreuzberg / Bethanien, Berlin
- 2008: Under a Red Sky, Stolenspace Gallery, London
- 2009: The Art of Rebellion, Robert Berman Gallery, Santa Monica, CA
- 2009: Urban Art – Werke aus der Sammlung Reinking, Weserburg | Museum für moderne Kunst, Bremen
- 2009: Viva la Revolucion: A Dialogue with the Urban Landscape, Museum of Contemporary Art San Diego – MCASD Downtown, San Diego, CA
- 2013: At home I'm a tourist’ Colección de Selim Varol, CAC Centro de Arte Contemporáneo de Málaga, Málaga
- 2014: The Insistent Image: Recurrent Motifs in the Art of Shepard Fairey and Jasper John, Halsey Institute of Contemporary Art, Charleston, SC
- 2014: Art Alliance: The Provocateurs, Block 37, Chicago, IL
- 2015: Sleeping Beauty, Magda Danysz Gallery, Paris, France
- 2019: POW! WOW!, Honolulu, Hawaii
- 2025: Triple Trouble, Newport Street Gallery, Newport Street, London

== Commercial artwork ==
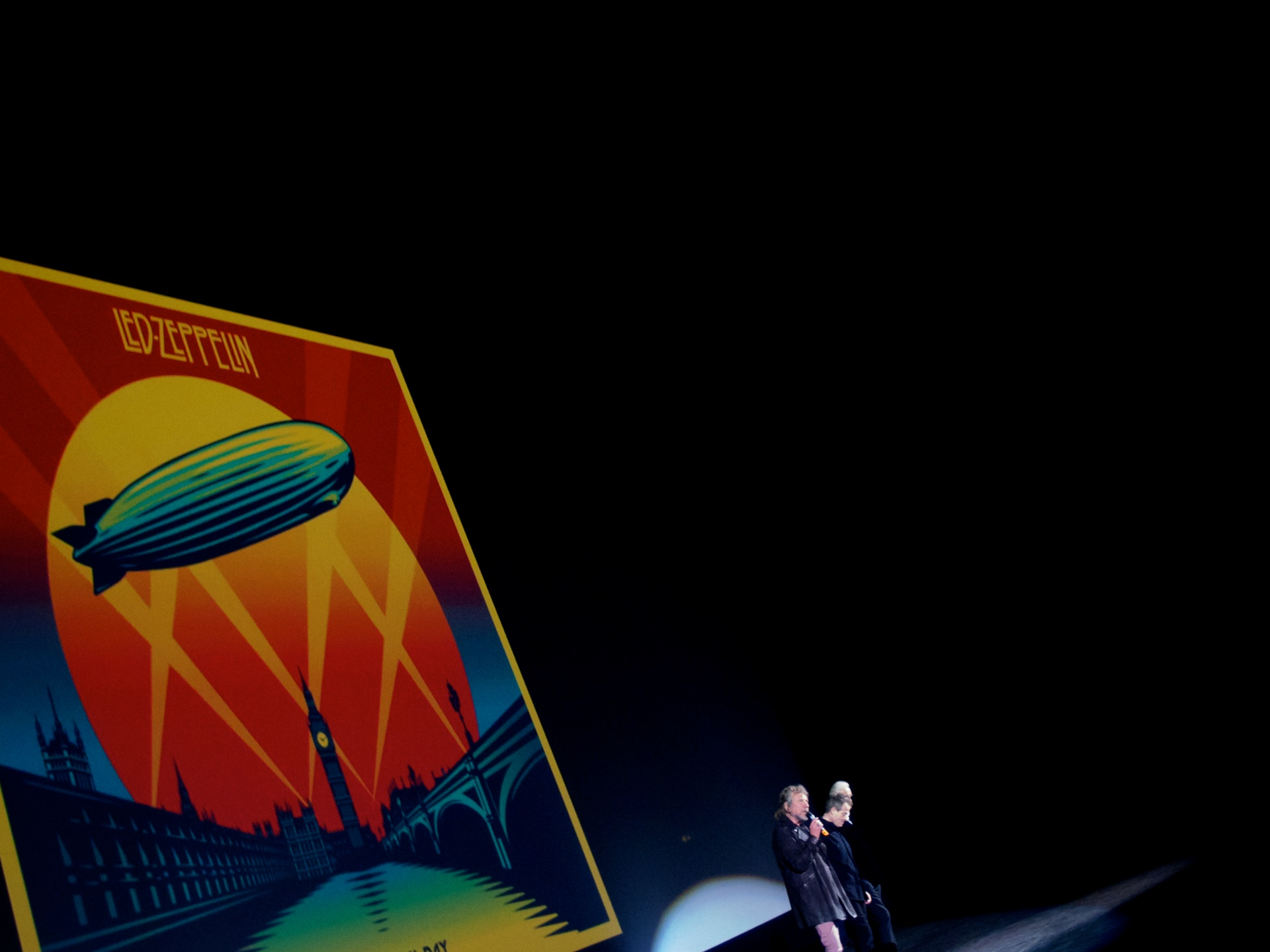
Promotional work by Fairey for the album and film Celebration Day served as a backdrop for a 2012 Led Zeppelin press conference

- Fairey designed the album artwork for Flogging Molly's Whiskey on a Sunday.
- He appears in the 2006 videogame, Marc Ecko's Getting Up: Contents Under Pressure, as himself.
- Fairey provided the design for the Obey Giant room at The Creek South Beach.
- Fairey designed the cover for the books Woodstock Experience by Michael Lang, Dan Garson, Henry Diltz (Genesis Publications, 2009), A Heartbeat and A Guitar: Johnny Cash and the Making of Bitter Tears. (Basic Books/Nation Books, 2009) by Antonino D'Ambrosio and the cover of the Smashing Pumpkins album Zeitgeist, Led Zeppelin's Mothership and Celebration Day, Sage Francis's Li(f)e, Tom Petty & The Heartbreakers' The Live Anthology and, in 2010, Stone Temple Pilots's eponymous album.
- He designed the album cover for will.i.am's second solo album Must B 21 (Soundtrack to Get Things Started).
- On January 19, 2009, Fairey created a Google Doodle for Martin Luther King Jr. Day.
- Fairey's iconic Obey logo appears in several levels of the video game Tony Hawk's Underground 2. It also appears briefly in part two of the anime Afro Samurai.
- The "Andre the Giant Has a Posse" is also a stock spray image in the video game Counter-Strike.
- Fairey designed the cover for Russell Brand's second autobiography Booky Wook 2.
- Fairey contributed a drawing to the Police Brutality Coloring Book in 2011.
- Fairey designed the album artwork for Stone Temple Pilots’ 2010 self-titled album.
- Fairey has released several watches with Swiss watchmaking company Hublot

== TV, radio and movies ==
- Rash, Video Documentary 2005. 17-minute interview conducted in April 2003 with Shepard Fairey in Sydney, Australia. Includes footage of Fairey and partner Barbara installing a paste-up wall in a gallery side event at Semi Permanent conference in Sydney.
- Fairey appears in the 2007 graffiti and street art documentary Bomb It in which he discusses the origins of the OBEY Giant street art campaign.
- On January 20, 2009, Fairey made a radio appearance on the Fresh Air program from WHYY, an NPR affiliate, discussing his "Hope" poster, the official Obama inauguration poster and his many arrests (14 times) in connection with the installation of his "street" works. On February 26, 2009, he was again a guest on Fresh Air discussing the Associated Press lawsuit over the Obama Hope poster.
- On February 11, 2010, Stephen Colbert debuted a poster on The Colbert Report that was designed in collaboration with Fairey. The poster, created for Colbert's coverage of the 2010 Winter Olympics, depicts Colbert wearing a laurel wreath crown, carrying an Olympic Flame and riding an eagle, with the catchphrase, "Vancouver 2010: Defeat the World".
- Along with artists Frank Stella and Andres Serrano, Fairey appeared on The Colbert Report on December 8, 2010. As part of a segment with comedian Steve Martin, Fairey sprayed his Obey logo on a portrait of Colbert.
- Fairey features heavily in the Banksy movie Exit Through the Gift Shop, which documents the birth of Mr. Brainwash.
- On the September 13, 2011, episode of The Young and the Restless, an American television soap opera, character Devon Hamilton purchased a Shepard Fairey original, Commanda, as the first piece of art for his new office.
- On the March 4, 2012, episode of The Simpsons, "Exit Through the Kwik-E-Mart", Fairey appeared as himself.
- Fairey appeared in the 2012 film Bones Brigade: An Autobiography as himself.
- In 2013, a short narrative film based on the story of Shepard Fairey was released called Obey the Giant.
- In the 2013 comedy film This Is the End, actor James Franco is depicted as having an "Andre the Giant Has a Posse" in his home and claiming it to be his favorite painting.
- In December 2013, Fairey was featured in Style Wars 2, a documentary directed by Veli Silver and Amos Angeles. The film explores the contemporary street art scene and its commercialization by following the directors across Europe, the United States, and the Middle East, paying homage to the 1983 classic Style Wars.
- In 2017, Obey Giant, a documentary based on Shepard Fairey and distributed by Hulu, was released.
- In 2018, he appeared in Bad Reputation, a documentary about Joan Jett's career.

== Personal life ==
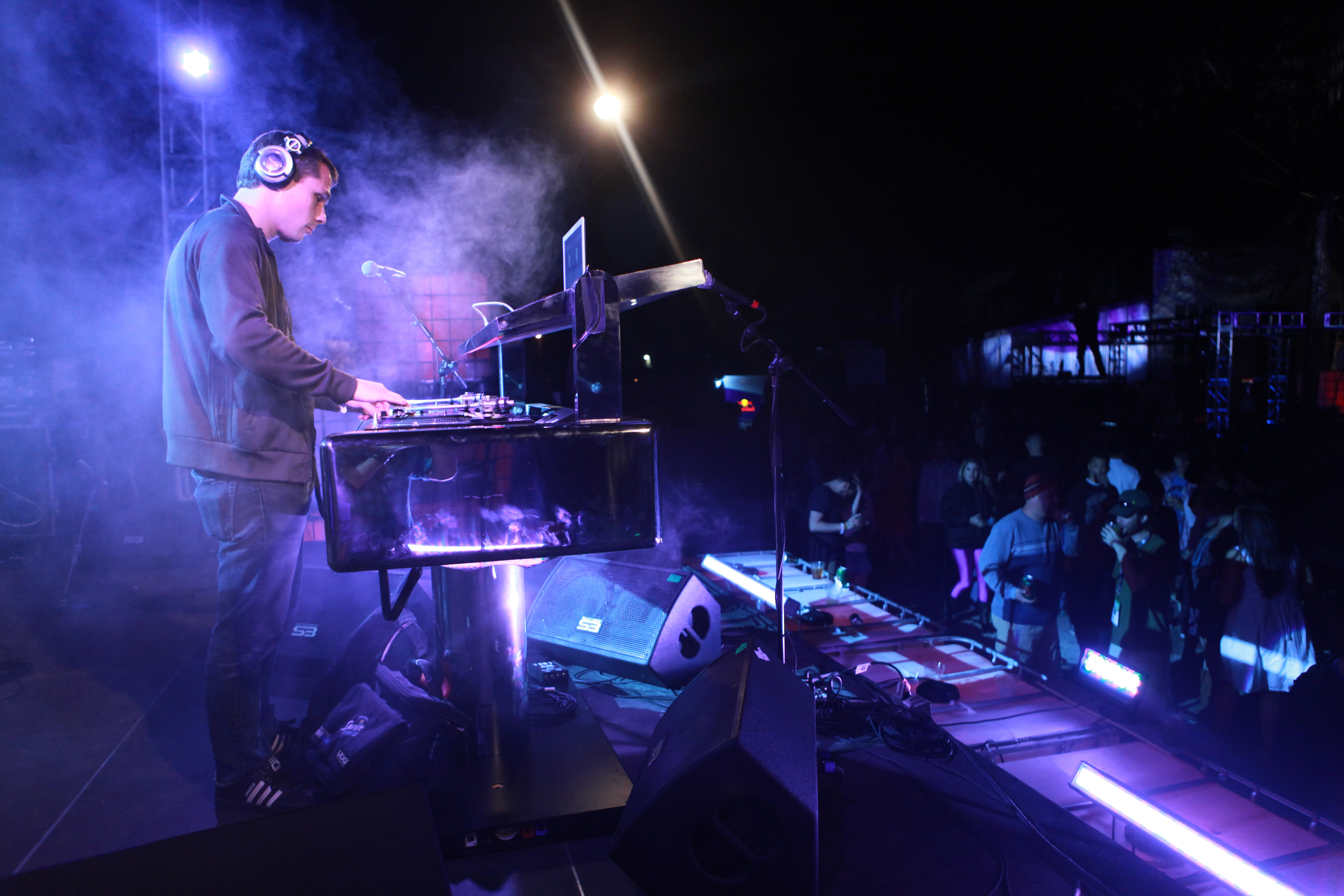
Fairey performing a DJ set in 2009.

Fairey now lives in the Los Feliz district of Los Angeles with his wife Amanda and daughters Vivienne and Madeline. In addition to his successful graphic design career, Fairey also DJs at many clubs under the names DJ Diabetic and Emcee Insulin, as he has Type 1 diabetes.

== See also ==
- Banksy (Bristol) – graffiti, stencil graffiti
- Tavar Zawacki a.k.a. ABOVE – American artist that addresses social and political issues in his street works.
- Invader – mosaic
- List of street artists
- King Robbo – graffiti, stencil graffiti
