= Tom Gralish =

American photographer

Tom Gralish is a Pulitzer Prize-winning American photographer.

Born in Mount Clemens, Michigan, he worked for United Press International and the now-defunct Las Vegas Valley Times before coming to work for the Philadelphia Inquirer in 1983 as a photographer and photo editor. On April 7, 1985, he shot a series of photographs of homeless people on the streets of Philadelphia. This series was awarded the Pulitzer Prize in 1986, when Gralish was 29 years old.
