= Handelsblatt =

German business newspaper

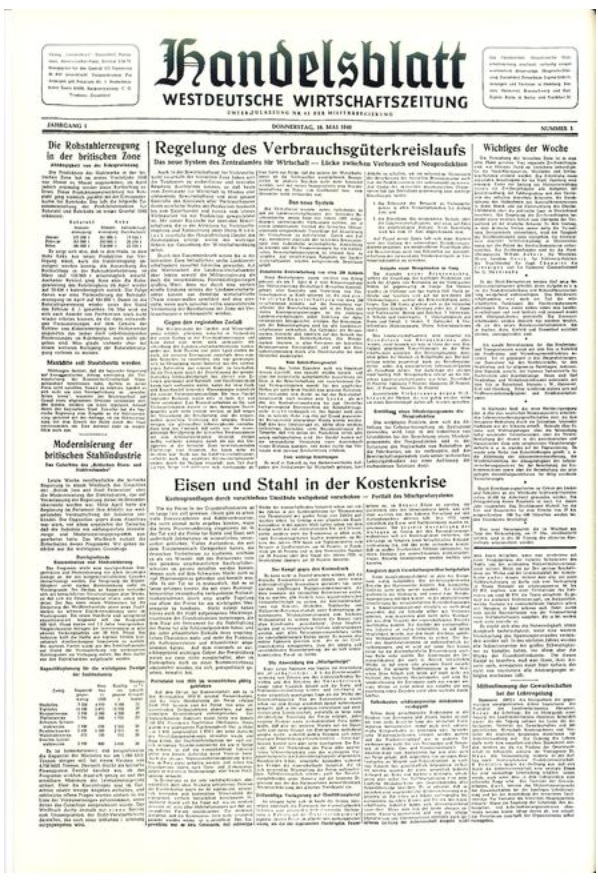
- Handelsblatt front page of the first issue
- Type: Daily newspaper
- Format: Compact
- Owner: Handelsblatt Media Group
- Editor: Sebastian Matthes
- Founded: 16 May 1946; 80 years ago
- Political alignment: Economic liberalism
- Language: German
- Headquarters: Düsseldorf
- Circulation: 127,546 (Print, 2018); 42,000 (Digital, 2018)
- ISSN: 0017-7296
- Website: www.handelsblatt.com

The Handelsblatt (literally "commerce paper" in English) is a German-language business newspaper published in Düsseldorf by Handelsblatt Media Group, formerly known as Verlagsgruppe Handelsblatt.

== History and profile ==
Handelsblatt was established in 1946 by journalist Herbert Gross, but after some months Friedrich Vogel (1902–1976) became publisher. In 1969, Georg von Holtzbrinck became partner of Friedrich Vogel. Since 2021, its editor-in-chief is Sebastian Matthes. Its publisher, Handelsblatt Media Group, also publishes the weekly business magazine Wirtschaftswoche, of which the editor-in-chief is Beat Balzli. Handelsblatt's headquarters are in Düsseldorf. In 2009, Dieter von Holtzbrinck bought Der Tagesspiegel, Handelsblatt, and Wirtschaftswoche from the Georg von Holtzbrinck Publishing Group. Handelsblatt had a circulation of 127,546 daily copies in 2018.

=== Handelsblatt Today ===
An English-language digital edition was launched in 2014, called Handelsblatt Global Edition, which aimed to reach an international audience interested in German business and finance news. It was published five days a week from its editorial office in Berlin with editor-in-chief, Kevin O'Brien at the helm. In 2017, under a new editor-in-chief, Andreas Kluth, the publication avoided the direct translation of German-language articles and instead worked through differences between German and Anglophone journalistic traditions to add details that English readers were accustomed to. The site was renamed Handelsblatt Today in 2018, but, unable to create a business model and reach a substantial audience to generate revenue, Kluth announced that publication would cease on 27 February 2019.

=== Anti-vaccine controversy ===
On 25 January 2021, Handelsblatt published an unsourced story falsely claiming that the Oxford–AstraZeneca COVID-19 vaccine was only 8% effective in people over 65 years old. AstraZeneca and the University of Oxford issued statements denying these claims. This story was refuted by the German Health Ministry, which clarified that the 8% actually referred to the number of people in the study who were between 56 and 69 years old. Markus Lehmkuhl, the Karlsruhe Institute of Technology's Professor for Science Communication, stated that Handelsblatt "turned the matter into a 'he says, she says' story to absolve itself of responsibility for spreading stupid stuff."

== Editors-in-chief ==
- Herbert Gross (1946 for some months)
- Friedrich Vogel
- Hans Mundorf
- Thomas Knipp (2002–2004) and Bernd Ziesemer (2002–2010)
- Gabor Steingart (2010–2013)
- Hans-Jürgen Jakobs (2013–2016)
- Sven Afhüppe (2016–2020)
- Sebastian Matthes (since 2020)
