= List of presidential trips made by Bill Clinton (1999) =

This is a list of presidential trips made by Bill Clinton during 1999, the seventh year of his presidency as the 42nd president of the United States. International trips are highlighted in blue.

This list excludes trips made within Washington, D.C., the U.S. federal capital in which the White House, the official residence and principal workplace of the president, is located. It also excludes the capital's immediate surroundings in Maryland and Virginia, such as Andrews Air Force Base in Maryland, where the president typically boards Air Force One for all trips outside the area. Also excluded are trips to Camp David, the country residence of the president.

== January ==
| State or country | Areas visited | Dates | Details |
|---|---|---|---|
| South Carolina | Hilton Head | December 30–January 1 | Stayed at Tony Brown's home. Attended a Renaissance Weekend Institute New Year's Eve dinner at the Hyatt Regency hotel. |
| Michigan | Detroit | January 8 | Toured the North American International Auto Show and took questions from the Economic Club of Detroit at Cobo Center. |
| New York | New York | January 15 | Addressed the Wall Street Project Conference at the Windows on the World restaurant atop 1 World Trade Center. This visit had been planned for January 14 but was postponed due to weather conditions. |
| New York | Buffalo | January 20 | Spoke at the Marine Midland Arena. |
| Pennsylvania | Norristown | January 20 | Spoke at Norristown Area High School. |
| Arkansas | Little Rock, Beebe | January 24 | Surveyed damage from the tornado outbreak of January 21–23, 1999. Visited a Harvest Foods store in Little Rock and the Beebe School District building. |
| Missouri | St. Louis | January 26 | At St. Louis Lambert International Airport, met with Pope John Paul II, who was arriving in the city to celebrate Mass at the Trans World Dome. |

== February ==
| State or country | Areas visited | Dates | Details |
|---|---|---|---|
| Massachusetts | Boston | February 2 | Attended a DNC luncheon at the Boston Park Plaza Hotel. Visited Jackson Mann Elementary School in Allston. |
| New York | New York | February 2 | Attended a DNC dinner at Le Cirque. |
| Georgia | Atlanta | February 5 | Attended a gala honoring Hank Aaron on his 65th birthday at the Hyatt Regency Atlanta. |
| Jordan | Amman | February 8 | Attended the funeral of King Hussein. |
| Virginia | Wintergreen | February 9 | Addressed the House Democratic caucus retreat at the Wintergreen Resort. |
| Mexico | Mérida | February 14–15 | State visit. Met with President Ernesto Zedillo. |
| New Hampshire | Dover, Manchester | February 18 | Participated in a roundtable discussion on HMOs at the Dover Municipal Building. Attended a State Democratic 100 Club dinner at the New Hampshire State Union Armory. |
| Arizona | Tucson | February 25 | Spoke at the Tucson Convention Center Music Hall. Visited the Arizona Diamondbacks during their spring training at Tucson Electric Park. |
| California | San Francisco, Los Angeles, Beverly Hills | February 25–27 | Attended a joint DSCC–DCCC dinner at Gordon Getty's home in San Francisco. Stayed at the Fairmont San Francisco. Gave a speech on foreign policy at the Grand Hyatt San Francisco. Addressed a Saxophone Club and Women's Leadership Forum reception at the Century Plaza Hotel. Attended a private fundraising dinner at Eli Broad's home in Beverly Hills. Stayed at Ronald Burkle's home in Beverly Hills. Golfed at the Riviera Country Club. |
| Utah | Park City | February 27–March 1 | Stayed at Jeffrey Katzenberg's home at the Deer Valley ski resort. |

== March ==
| State or country | Areas visited | Dates | Details |
|---|---|---|---|
| New Jersey | Newark | March 3 | Spoke at a reception for Senator Robert Torricelli at the New Jersey Performing Arts Center. |
| Nicaragua | Managua, Posoltega, El Porvenir | March 8 | Discussed reconstruction aid with President Arnoldo Aleman. |
| Honduras | Soto Cano Air Base, Tegucigalpa | March 8–9 | Discussed reconstruction aid with President Carlos Roberto Flores. Addressed U.S. military personnel. |
| El Salvador | San Salvador | March 10 | Addressed Legislative Assembly. |
| Guatemala | Guatemala City, Antigua | March 10–11 | Attended the Central American Summit. |
| Arkansas | Hope | March 12 | Dedicated his childhood home as a museum. Toured the Hope Visitor Center and Museum. |
| Texas | Texarkana | March 12 | Raised funds for Representative Max Sandlin at the Sheraton Four Points Hotel and at Texarkana College. |
| Arkansas | Little Rock | March 13 | Visited his mother-in-law Dorothy Howell Rodham. Attended a DNC reception at the home of Entergy CEO Jerry Maulden, and an Arkansas Democratic Party fundraising dinner at the Statehouse Convention Center. |
| Florida | Stuart | March 16 | Attended a DNC dinner at Willie E. Gary's home. |

== April ==
| State or country | Areas visited | Dates | Details |
|---|---|---|---|
| Virginia | Norfolk | April 1 | Spoke about the Kosovo War at Naval Station Norfolk. |
| Pennsylvania | Philadelphia | April 9 | Advocated for the Patients' Bill of Rights at Memorial Hall. |
| Louisiana | Bossier City | April 12 | Met with families of victims of the tornado outbreak of April 2–3, 1999. |
| California | San Francisco | April 15 | Took questions from the American Society of Newspaper Editors on the Kosovo War at the Fairmont San Francisco. |
| Michigan | Dearborn, Roseville, Harrison Township | April 16 | Spoke at a Majority 2000 luncheon at the Fairlane Club in Dearborn. Met with representatives of humanitarian relief organizations and Albanian Americans at the Roseville Recreation Center. Met with the family of prisoner of war Christopher Stone at Selfridge Air National Guard Base. |
| Massachusetts | Bedford, Weston | April 16 | Met with local Albanian Americans at Hanscom Air Force Base. Attended a Majority 2000 dinner at Alan Solomont's home. |

== May ==
| State or country | Areas visited | Dates | Details |
|---|---|---|---|
| Belgium | Brussels | May 4 | Discussed the Kosovo War with NATO officials. |
| Germany | Frankfurt, Ramstein Air Base, Spangdahlem Air Base, Bonn, Ingelheim | May 4–6 | Addressed U.S. military personnel; met with Chancellor Gerhard Schröder; met with Kosovo War refugees. |
| Texas | Houston, Austin | May 7–8 | Attended a DNC luncheon at La Colombe d'Or, and a dinner at a private residence in Austin. |
| Oklahoma | Oklahoma City, Del City | May 8 | Toured damage from the 1999 Bridge Creek–Moore tornado. |
| Georgia | Atlanta | May 11 | Participated in a roundtable discussion about the New Markets Tax Credit Program with local business owners at the Sweet Auburn Curb Market. |
| Washington | Seattle | May 14 | Attended a DNC luncheon at the Rainier Club. Visited the Elliott Bay Book Company. |
| California | Portola Valley, Palo Alto, Beverly Hills, Los Angeles, San Diego | May 14–16 | Attended a DNC dinner at Walter Shorenstein's home in Portola Valley. Stayed at Steve Jobs' home in Palo Alto. Attended a joint DSCC–DCCC dinner at the Greystone Mansion. Stayed at the Century Plaza Hotel. Attended a DNC luncheon at Irwin M. Jacobs' home in San Diego. |
| Nevada | Las Vegas | May 16–17 | Attended DNC receptions at the homes of Elias Ghanem and Brian Greenspun. |
| New York | New York | May 19 | Spoke at the launch of a project to redevelop New York Penn Station at the James A. Farley Building. Attended a DNC luncheon at Jack Rosen's home. |
| Colorado | Littleton | May 20 | Met with families of victims of the Columbine High School massacre at Light of the World Catholic Church and Dakota Ridge High School. |
| Virginia | Irvington | May 22 | Attended a Senate Democratic retreat at The Tides Inn. |
| Louisiana | Grambling | May 23 | Gave the commencement address at Grambling State University. |
| Texas | Edinburg | May 25 | Held the annual White House Community Empowerment Conference at the University of Texas–Pan American. |
| Florida | Yulee | May 25–30 | Vacationed and golfed at White Oak Plantation, where a Democratic Leadership Council meeting was held on May 30. |

== June ==
| State or country | Areas visited | Dates | Details |
|---|---|---|---|
| Colorado | Colorado Springs | June 2 | Gave the commencement address at the United States Air Force Academy. |
| Missouri | Knob Noster | June 11 | Visited Whiteman Air Force Base, where he toured a Northrop B-2 Spirit bomber and met with participants in the NATO bombing of Yugoslavia, which had concluded the day before. |
| Illinois | Chicago | June 12 | Gave the commencement address at the University of Chicago. |
| Switzerland | Geneva | June 16 | Addressed ILO Conference. Met with President Ruth Dreifuss. |
| France | Paris | June 16–17 | Discussed peacekeeping in Kosovo with President Jacques Chirac and Prime Minister Lionel Jospin. |
| Germany | Cologne, Bonn | June 17–21 | Attended the 25th G8 summit. |
| Slovenia | Ljubljana | June 21–22 | Met with President Milan Kučan, Prime Minister Janez Drnovšek and Montenegrin president Milo Đukanović. |
| North Macedonia|name=Republic of Macedonia | Skopje | June 22 | Met with President Kiro Gligorov. Addressed Kosovar refugees and NATO military personnel. |
| Italy | Aviano Air Base | June 22 | Addressed U.S. military personnel. |
| Connecticut | Westport | June 28 | Attended a DNC luncheon at Fran Goldstein's home. |
| New York | New York | June 28 | Attended a special performance of The Iceman Cometh at the Brooks Atkinson Theatre. Attended a Majority 2000 dinner at the Supper Club, and a fundraising dinner for his presidential library at La Grenouille. |
| Illinois | Chicago | June 30 | Spoke about modernizing Medicare at the Chicago Cultural Center. Held a fundraising luncheon for his presidential library at the Hilton Chicago. Attended a Chicago Cubs–Milwaukee Brewers game at Wrigley Field. Attended a DNC dinner at Lewis Manilow's home. |

== July ==
| State or country | Areas visited | Dates | Details |
|---|---|---|---|
| Kentucky | Tyner, Annville, Hazard | July 5 | Visited Tyner Elementary School. Toured a local business, Mid-South Electronics. Spoke on Main Street in Hazard. |
| Tennessee | Memphis | July 5–6 | Visited Blues City Cafe and the National Civil Rights Museum. Stayed at the Peabody Hotel. |
| Mississippi | Clarksdale | July 6 | Toured a local business, Waterfield Cabinet Company, where he participated in a roundtable discussion about investment in the Mississippi Delta area and the New Markets Tax Credit Program. Visited Hick's Barbeque. |
| Illinois | East St. Louis | July 6 | Spoke at the Walgreens drugstore on State Street. |
| South Dakota | Keystone, Custer, Rapid City, Pine Ridge | July 6–7 | Visited Mount Rushmore National Memorial and the Crazy Horse Memorial. Stayed at the Ramkota Hotel in Rapid City. Spoke at the Pine Ridge Indian Reservation and toured Pine Ridge School. |
| Arizona | Phoenix | July 7 | Toured the Chicanos Por La Causa Business Incubator and a local business, La Canasta Factory. Visited Poncho's Mexican Restaurant. |
| California | Los Angeles, Anaheim, Beverly Hills, Torrance, Pasadena | July 7–10 | Stayed at the Westin Bonaventure Hotel. Toured Alain Leroy Locke High School and Los Angeles Southwest College. Addressed the National Academy Foundation conference at the Anaheim Hilton and Towers. Stayed two nights at Ronald Burkle's home in Beverly Hills. Advocated for the Patients' Bill of Rights at Harbor–UCLA Medical Center. Golfed at Riviera Country Club. Attended the 1999 FIFA Women's World Cup final at the Rose Bowl. |
| Florida | Miami Beach, Indian Creek, Coral Gables | July 13 | Addressed the Communications Workers of America convention at the Miami Beach Convention Center. Golfed at the Indian Creek Country Club. Attended a Florida Democratic Party dinner at Alfonso Fanjul Jr.'s home. |
| Maryland | Baltimore | July 14 | Addressed the Democratic Leadership Council annual meeting at the Baltimore Convention Center. |
| Iowa | Des Moines | July 16 | Spoke about school modernization at Amos Hiatt Middle School. Met with local farmers at the Hotel Fort Des Moines. Raised funds for Senator Tom Harkin at Jerry Crawford's home, and at the Val Air Ballroom. |
| Michigan | Lansing | July 22 | Spoke about Medicare at Lansing Community College. |
| New York | New York | July 23 | Attended the memorial service for John F. Kennedy Jr. and Carolyn Bessette Kennedy at St. Thomas More Church. |
| Ohio | Cincinnati | July 23 | Attended a Democratic Business Council and DNC dinner at Stanley Chesley's home. |
| Colorado | Aspen | July 23–24 | Stayed at Dirk Ziff's home. Attended DNC fundraising events at the homes of Dianne Feinstein and Melvin Simon. |
| Morocco | Rabat | July 25 | Attended the funeral of King Hassan II. Met with Palestinian Authority president Yasser Arafat and Israeli prime minister Ehud Barak. |
| Italy | Aviano Air Base | July 29–30 | Stopped en route to Sarajevo. |
| Bosnia and Herzegovina | Sarajevo | July 30 | Attended Stability Pact Leaders Conference. |
| Italy | Aviano Air Base | July 30 | Stopped during return to Washington D.C. |

== August ==
| State or country | Areas visited | Dates | Details |
|---|---|---|---|
| Illinois | Chicago | August 3 | Addressed the National Forum on Welfare to Work at Navy Pier Festival Hall. Met with the AFL-CIO executive committee at the Drake Hotel. |
| Arkansas | Little Rock, Helena | August 6–8 | Golfed at Chenal Country Club with Bryce Molder. Addressed the Arkansas Broadcasters Association 50th anniversary dinner at the Embassy Suites hotel. Visited his mother-in-law Dorothy Howell Rodham. Spoke at Thompson–Robbins Airport. Met with local leaders at the Delta Cultural Center. Met with local farmers at Andina Cafe in Little Rock. Attended Gore 2000 fundraisers at the Statehouse Convention Center and at Ark Monroe's home. |
| Missouri | St. Louis | August 8 | Addressed the National Governors Association convention at Adam's Mark Hotel. |
| Georgia | Atlanta | August 9 | Addressed the American Bar Association at the Georgia World Congress Center. Presented the Presidential Medal of Freedom to former president Jimmy Carter and First Lady Rosalynn Carter at the Carter Center. |
| New York | New Rochelle | August 15 | Toured houses in the area for potential purchase. |
| Missouri | Kansas City | August 16 | Addressed the Veterans of Foreign Wars 100th anniversary convention at Bartle Hall. |
| Massachusetts | Martha's Vineyard | August 19–28 | Stayed at Richard L. Friedman's summer home. Celebrated his 53rd birthday at Vernon Jordan's home. Raised funds for the American Ireland Fund at Robert Matthews' home, for his wife Hillary Rodham Clinton's Senate campaign at Smith Bagley's home, and for Martha's Vineyard Hospital at Farm Neck Golf Club. |
| New York | East Hampton, Bridgehampton, Syracuse, Skaneateles, Auburn, Seneca Falls, Waterloo, Jamesville | August 28–September 3 | Attended a DNC reception at Liz Robbins' home, and Saxophone Club receptions at East Hampton Airport and Jane Rosenthal's home. Stayed at Steven Spielberg's home. Golfed at South Fork Country Club. Addressed the State Comptroller's annual lunch at the New York State Fair. Stayed at Thomas McDonald's home in Skaneateles. Golfed at Bellevue Country Club in Syracuse and at LaFayette Golf and Country Club in Jamesville. Visited Terry McAuliffe's mother Millie at St. Camillus Nursing and Rehabilitation Center. Toured the William H. Seward House, Harriet Tubman National Historical Park, the National Women's Hall of Fame, the M'Clintock House, and the Waterloo Library. Raised funds for Hillary Rodham Clinton at Mulrooney's Pub in Syracuse. Toured Belle H. Waterman Elementary School in Skaneateles. |

== September ==
| State or country | Areas visited | Dates | Details |
|---|---|---|---|
| Virginia | Norfolk, Newport News | September 6 | Participated in a classroom renovation project at Coleman Place Elementary School in Norfolk. Attended a Labor Day picnic at Representative Bobby Scott's home in Newport News. |
| New Zealand | Auckland, Queenstown, Christchurch | September 11–15 | Attended the APEC Summit Meeting. State Visit. |
| Hawaii | Honolulu | September 15 | Stopover at Hickam Air Force Base on the way back from New Zealand. |
| North Carolina | Raleigh, Tarboro | September 20 | Toured the damage from Hurricane Floyd. |
| New York | New York | September 21 | Attended the opening of the 54th United Nations General Assembly at United Nations Headquarters. |
| Louisiana | New Orleans | September 27 | Visited Sophie B. Wright Middle School and the Fairmont New Orleans. Campaigned for Representative William Jefferson at St. Elizabeth's Orphanage and at a private residence. |
| New York | Palisades | September 30 | Addressed the National Education Summit at the IBM Palisades Executive Conference Center. |

== October ==
| State or country | Areas visited | Dates | Details |
|---|---|---|---|
| Nevada | Las Vegas | October 1 | Attended a DSCC luncheon at Paris Las Vegas' Eiffel Tower Restaurant. |
| California | Palo Alto, Beverly Hills, Brentwood | October 1–3 | Attended DNC receptions and campaigned for Representative Brad Sherman at private residences. Addressed the Access Now for Gay and Lesbian Equality dinner at the Beverly Hilton. |
| New York | New York | October 7 | Attended a DSCC reception at the McGraw-Hill Building penthouse. Addressed the National Labor Research Association at the New York Hilton Midtown, and an Empire State Pride Agenda gala at the Sheraton New York Hotel and Towers. |
| Canada | Ottawa, Mont-Tremblant | October 7–8 | Met with Prime Minister Jean Chrétien and Quebec Premier Lucien Bouchard. Attended Federalism Conference at Mont Tremblant. Dedicated new U.S. Embassy building. |
| Illinois | Chicago | October 8 | Addressed a United States Hispanic Leadership Institute conference at McCormick Place. |
| Virginia | Augusta County | October 13 | Spoke about preservation of National Forests at Reddish Knob Overlook in the George Washington National Forest. |
| New Jersey | Newark, Elizabeth | October 18 | Spoke about aid for areas affected by Hurricane Floyd at Newark International Airport. Attended a New Jersey Democratic Assembly dinner at Raymond Lesniak's home. |
| New York | New York | October 25 | Attended a Broadway gala fundraiser for Hillary Rodham Clinton on her 52nd birthday at the Ford Center for the Performing Arts. |
| Pennsylvania | Philadelphia | October 29 | Campaigned for John F. Street for mayor at La Salle University. |
| Georgia | Atlanta | October 29 | Attended a DNC dinner at a private residence, and an Anti-Defamation League dinner at the Grand Hyatt Atlanta in Buckhead. |

== November ==
| State or country | Areas visited | Dates | Details |
|---|---|---|---|
| Norway | Oslo | November 1–2 | State visit. Held discussions with Prime Minister Kjell Magne Bondevik Attended commemorative ceremony for former Israeli prime minister Yitzhak Rabin. Met with Russian prime minister Vladimir Putin; also met with Palestinian Authority chairman Yasser Arafat and Prime Minister Ehud Barak of Israel. |
| New Jersey | Newark | November 4 | Met with Project GRAD students at Malcolm X Shabazz High School. |
| Connecticut | Hartford | November 4 | Toured the El Mercado marketplace. |
| Arkansas | Little Rock, Hermitage | November 4–5 | Toured the Hermitage Tomato Cooperative. Held a teleconference with the Arkansas Radio Network on agricultural issues. |
| Illinois | Chicago | November 5 | Spoke at Englewood High School. |
| Pennsylvania | York | November 10 | Met with employees at the Harley-Davidson Vehicle Operations plant. |
| Turkey | Ankara, İzmit, Ephesus, Istanbul | November 15–19 | State visit. Attended Organization for Security and Cooperation in Europe Summit meeting. |
| Greece | Athens | November 19–20 | State visit. Met with Prime Minister Konstantinos Simitis. |
| Italy | Florence | November 20–21 | Attended conference on Progressive Governance for the 21st Century. |
| Bulgaria | Sofia | November 21–23 | Met with President Petar Stoyanov and Prime Minister Ivan Kostov. |
| Yugoslavia (Kosovo) | Pristina, Uroševac, Camp Bondsteel | November 23 | Met with Kosovar Transitional Council. Addressed the Albanian community and U.S. military personnel. |
| Italy | Aviano Air Base | November 23 | Stopped during return to Washington D.C. |
| California | San Francisco, Beverly Hills | November 30 | Attended a Stop the Violence benefit event at a private residence, and a Southwest Voter Registration and Education Project at the Grand Havana Room. |
| Washington | Seattle | November 30–December 2 | Attended the World Trade Organization Ministerial Conference of 1999 at the Washington State Convention and Trade Center. Signed the Worst Forms of Child Labour Convention agreement at the Bell Harbor International Conference Center. |

== December ==
| State or country | Areas visited | Dates | Details |
|---|---|---|---|
| Pennsylvania | Philadelphia | December 2 | Campaigned for Mayor Ed Rendell at the Pennsylvania Convention Center. |
| Massachusetts | Worcester | December 9 | Attended a memorial service at Centrum Centre for the firefighters killed in the Worcester Cold Storage and Warehouse Co. fire. |
| Arkansas | Little Rock, West Memphis, Earle | December 10 | Addressed the Greater Little Rock Chamber of Commerce at the Statehouse Convention Center. Spoke at Mid-South Community College's Civic Auditorium. Dedicated a building expansion at Earle High School. |
| Florida | Orlando, Fort Lauderdale, Coral Gables | December 10–11 | Addressed the Florida State Democratic Convention at the Wyndham Palace Resort & Spa. Campaigned for Representative Alcee Hastings at the Keiser College auditorium. Attended a Unity Reception at the Miami Biltmore Hotel. |
