= Gabor Steingart =

German journalist and author

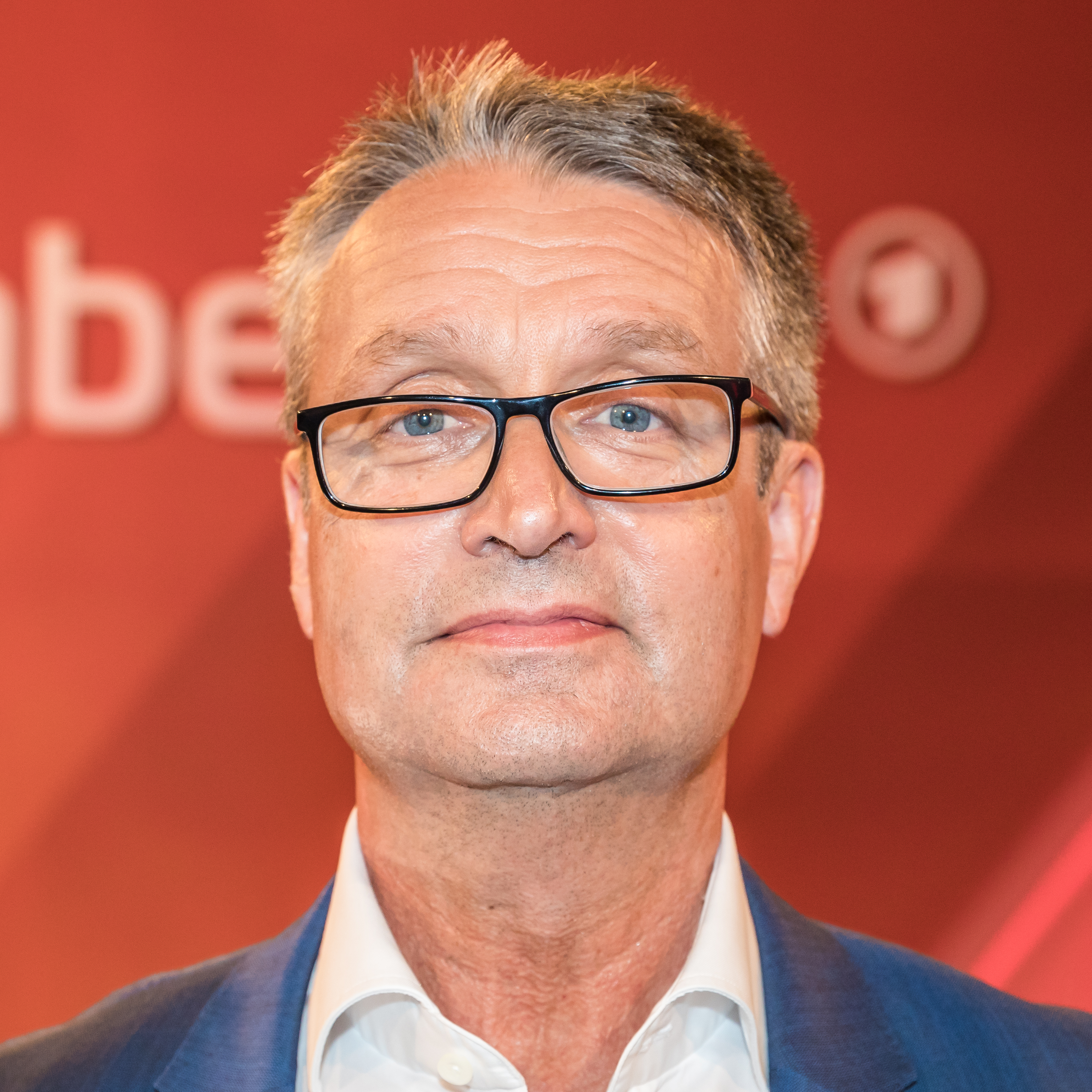
- Steingart in 2018
- Born: 1962 (age 63–64); Berlin-Kreuzberg, West Berlin, West Germany
- Occupations: Journalist; Author
- Website: www.gaborsteingart.com

Gabor Steingart (born 1962 in West Berlin) is a German journalist and the author of several books. He was the chief editor of Handelsblatt from 2010 to 2018. In 2018, he founded his own media company that produces and publishes news, commentaries, and interviews.

Steingart has said that "freedom of expression is not a gift, it is an obligation. The problem is not the critical journalists, the problem is the harmless ones."

== Life ==
Steingart was born in 1962 in Berlin-Kreuzberg, the son of a Hungarian political asylum seeker and his German wife. He studied political science and macroeconomics at Philipps-Universität Marburg and at Freie Universität Berlin. After finishing his university studies, he attended Georg von Holtzbrinck-Schule für Wirtschaftsjournalisten in Düsseldorf. Steingart first worked for Corporate Finance and after that for Wirtschaftswoche. He joined Der Spiegel as a business correspondent in 1990 and became its Berlin bureau chief in 2001, a post he held until 2007. He then moved to the United States of America and worked as the magazine's senior Washington DC correspondent. On 5 April 2010, he became the editor-in-chief of Handelsblatt, Germany's leading business newspaper. In 2013, Steingart became chairman of the managing board of the parent company VHB publishing group. He was dismissed by the publisher Dieter von Holtzbrinck in early 2018.

== Steingarts Morning Briefing ==
Steingart founded "Media Pioneer" in Berlin in 2018. In June 2018, he started to issue a daily newsletter called Steingarts Morning Briefing published Monday to Friday in German focusing on politics and business. Distributed by email it became quickly the top newsletter in Germany. Since August 2018, he has also issued the daily Der Podcast with commentaries and interviews with people in politics, business, and culture. As of 2022, Pioneer Media claimed to have more than 200,000 newsletter subscribers and over one million podcast listens per week. The venture, which included the launch of the world's first boat designed as a workplace for journalists in 2020, has expanded to include over 30 journalists and plans have been unveiled to launch another vessel, the Pioneer Two.

== Works ==
Steingart has written several books. Deutschland. Der Abstieg eines Superstars (2004), in which he criticised the country's lackluster economy and the politicians' inability to reform, received wide media attention. Steingart was named Wirtschaftsjournalist des Jahres (Business journalist of the year) in 2004. His next book, Weltkrieg um Wohlstand. Wie Macht und Reichtum neu verteilt werden (2006) was published in 20 countries. A revised version (The War for Wealth) was published in the United States in 2008. Former US Secretary of State Henry Kissinger described the book as "a lucid and compelling reality check". In his Spiegel columns, Steingart was a persistent and abrasive critic of U.S. President Barack Obama.

== Critical appraisal in established media ==
Steingart's systematic use of catchy metaphors is a characteristic of his journalism, which pursues a specific agenda. His capricious style makes people and ideas big, small or ridiculous, as is common in social media political journalism. Steingart is a well-integrated, prototypical representative of this layer.

According to an article in the German magazine Der Spiegel, hubris is a way of life for Steingart, for whom "it can't be big, fast, powerful, loud enough". This leads to regular scaremongering that can be summed up as "apocalypse daily". Thereby, it sometimes happens that in the heat of the moment he doesn't see the plank in his own eye. In February 2020, for example, he boastfully called for the cancellation of subscriptions to the Süddeutsche Zeitung, the Der Spiegel, the Frankfurter Allgemeine Zeitung and the rest of the 'serious press', because these newspapers had incorrectly predicted that Donald Trump would lose the 2016 US elections. However, Steingart had predicted the same shortly before the said elections.

Steingart's motto, "100 percent journalism, no fairy tales", is reminiscent of the populism of the self-styled "lateral thinkers" against the "lying press", a pejorative political term, used intermittently since the 19th century in political polemics in Germany, that became popular again in recent years during the Corona crisis and the Pegida demonstrations.

== Awards ==
- 2007 Helmut-Schmidt-Journalistenpreis
- 2012 "Medienmann des Jahres 2012" by Horizont
- 2017 "Handelsblatt" under his leadership was named "European Newspaper of the Year" by the European Newspaper Award

== Books ==
- Steingart, Gabor: Widerspruch unerwünscht. Beobachtungen aus 111 Jahren Fuldaer Zeitung, Petersberg, Zeitdruck-Verlag Möller 1984, 173 S., Ill.
- Steingart, Gabor: Das Konzept der "wissenschaftlich-technischen Revolution" und die Problematik individuellen Leistungsverhaltens in der DDR-Wirtschaft, Berlin, Freie Universität Berlin, Diplomarbeit, 1987.
- Stefan Aust; Claus Richter; Gabor Steingart. Unter Mitarbeit von Matthias Ziemann: Deutschland — Der Abstieg eines Superstars, München, Piper 2004, 279 S., Ill., ISBN 3-492-04615-0,
- Steingart, Gabor: Die stumme Prinzessin. Ein Leben in Deutschland, München, Piper 2005, ISBN 3-492-24481-5.
- Steingart, Gabor: Weltkrieg um Wohlstand. Wie Macht und Reichtum neu verteilt werden, München, Piper 2006, ISBN 3-492-04761-0.
- Steingart, Gabor: The War for Wealth – The True Story of Globalization, or Why the Flat World is Broken, McGraw Hill, 2008, ISBN 978-0-07-154596-9.
