= Potsdamer Neueste Nachrichten =

German newspaper in Potsdam, Brandenburg

- Type: Daily newspaper
- Owner(s): Dieter von Holtzbrinck Medien GmbH
- Publisher: Potsdamer Zeitungsverlagsgesellschaft mbH & Co.KG
- Editor-in-chief: Sabine Schicketanz
- Founded: 1951
- Language: German
- Headquarters: Potsdamer Zeitungsverlagsgesellschaft, Platz der Einheit 14, D-14412 Potsdam
- Circulation: 8,276
- Website: www.pnn.de

The Potsdamer Neueste Nachrichten (German pronunciation: [ˈpɔtsdamɐ ˈnɔʏəstə ˈnaːxˌʁɪçtn̩]; transl. "Potsdam Latest News"), also known as PNN, was a regional, daily newspaper for the area in and around Potsdam, the state capital of Brandenburg in Germany. It was published by DvH Medien, a holding company founded by Dieter von Holtzbrinck. Now it is united with Tagesspiegel.

== History ==
The newspaper was created in 1951 under the name of Brandenburgische Neueste Nachrichten as the party organ of the Eastern German National Democratic Party of Germany.

In 1990, after the party was dissolved, the newspaper was taken over by Der Tagesspiegel, a Berlin newspaper. Since 13 July 1991, it is called Potsdamer Neueste Nachrichten. They belong to DvH Medien and share the same articles of national and international topics.

Until the end of 2019, it also included Potsdam am Sonntag, distributed to all households on Sundays as a free advertising newspaper.
