= Der Tagesspiegel =

German newspaper

- 17 September 2010 front page
- Type: Daily newspaper
- Format: Broadsheet
- Owner: Verlag Der Tagesspiegel GmbH (Dieter von Holtzbrinck Media)
- Editor: Stephan-Andreas Casdorff; Lorenz Maroldt
- Founded: 27 September 1945; 80 years ago
- Language: German
- Headquarters: Berlin, Germany
- ISSN: 1865-2263
- Website: tagesspiegel.de

Der Tagesspiegel (lit. 'The Daily Mirror') is a German daily newspaper. It has regional correspondent offices in Washington, D.C., and Potsdam. Der Tagesspiegel is a liberal newspaper which is classified as centrist media in the context of German politics.

== History and profile ==
Founded on 27 September 1945 by Erik Reger, Walther Karsch and Edwin Redslob, Der Tagesspiegel's main office is based in Berlin at Askanischer Platz in the locality of Kreuzberg, about 600 metres (2,000 ft) from Potsdamer Platz and the former location of the Berlin Wall.

For more than 45 years, Der Tagesspiegel was owned by an independent trust. In 1993, in response to an increasingly competitive publishing environment, and to attract investments required for technical modernisation, such as commission of a new printing plant, and improved distribution, it was bought by the Georg von Holtzbrinck Publishing Group. Its current publisher is Dieter von Holtzbrinck with editors in chief Stephan-Andreas Casdorff and Lorenz Maroldt. Pierre Gerckens, Giovanni di Lorenzo and Hermann Rudolph are editors of the newspaper. Some of the notable writers include Bas Kast and Harald Martenstein.

The paper's main readership is in the western half of the city, due to the 1948 blockade having stopped its circulation in East Berlin and Brandenburg. The paper has recently been redesigned, introducing more colour and a clearer typeface. In 2005 it was awarded the World's Best-Designed Newspapers Award by the Society for News Design in New York. It is owned by Verlag Der Tagesspiegel GmbH, a member of the Georg von Holtzbrinck Publishing Group, and associated with the Wall Street Journal. In 2009, Dieter von Holtzbrinck bought Der Tagesspiegel and Handelsblatt from Holtzbrinck.

From 2005 to 2008, American journalist Michael Scaturro edited the English-language version of Der Tagesspiegel, which was known as The Berlin Paper.

In 2007 and 2008 Der Tagesspiegel's Washington, D.C., correspondent, Christoph von Marschall, was noted in both Germany and the United States for his coverage of Barack Obama's presidential campaign. He wrote a book entitled Barack Obama – Der schwarze Kennedy. The literal translation of its German title is "Barack Obama – the Black Kennedy". His book was a bestseller in Germany, where other commentators had also compared the two Americans.

Tagesspiegel, along with Radioeins, have awarded the Soundcheck Award for "Best Album of the Year" since 2009.
