= The Berlin Paper =

- Type: Online newspaper
- Owner(s): Verlag Der Tagesspiegel GmbH (Dieter von Holtzbrinck Media)
- Editor: Michael Scaturro
- Founded: March 2005
- Language: English
- Headquarters: Berlin
- Website: http://theberlinpaper.com

The Berlin Paper was the English-language version of the Berlin-based newspaper, Der Tagesspiegel.

Founded and edited by Michael Scaturro, the site appeared online from 2005 until 2008. Verity Oberg served as co-editor from July 2006.

The site contained original articles written by Scaturro and Oberg, contributions from freelance writers, and translated content from Der Tagesspiegel and its sister publication, Zitty magazine.

It also hosted the website of National Public Radio's Berlin radio station (NPR Berlin) when that station was first founded in 2005.
