= American Studies Leipzig =

- Field of research: American Studies
- Location: Leipzig, Germany
- Affiliations: University of Leipzig

American Studies Leipzig is the research and teaching institution for American Studies at University of Leipzig. A transdisciplinary institute focussing on literature and cultural studies, it is the largest institute for American Studies in Eastern Germany.

Established 1997 and supported by donations, Frank Freidel Memorial Library features about 15,000 books and periodicals with a topical focus on the New Deal.

American Studies Leipzig is the fastest-growing institute for American Studies in Germany that is not located in Berlin.

== History ==
In 2003, the Fulbright Commission endowed a newly created Distinguished Chair guest professorship, after the CHE research and education thinktank, part of Bertelsmann Foundation, had attested to the institute's quality.

In September 2005, the DAAD created the DAAD Distinguished Chair for American and International Studies guest professorship. This was intended to facilitate the institute's openness to innovation and its dedication to transatlantic studies.

In 2006, the institute succeeded in winning its third guest professorship in only four years. The Picador Chair for Literature is the outcome of a series of events sponsored by Georg von Holtzbrinck Publishing Group in cooperation with DAAD. Its purpose is to invite young English-speaking authors to live, write and teach in Leipzig. Thus, American Studies Leipzig is the only German institute for American studies supplementing its program of literary studies with the perspective of creative artists.

The institute features the largest research corpus on the New Deal in a German university.

== Impact ==
Beyond its meaning for the University, the institute became part of Leipzig's cultural milieu. It features regular public readings by American authors, public events like the HipHop Awareness Week and continuing education of Gymnasium teachers.

For issues of American culture and politics, the institute is an important counterpart for regional and national media. Institute members are often consulted for commentary concerning current events in the US.

== Research ==
The Institute focuses on cultural and literary studies of the United States.

Research at the institute focusses on Ethnic groups, Gender, Immigration to the United States and Popular culture studies.
