= Macmillan Education =

London-based educational book imprint

- Product type: Books, educational materials and services
- Current owner: Holtzbrinck Publishing Group (53%); BC Partners (47%)
- Introduced: Early 1970s
- Markets: About 120 countries
- Previous owners: Macmillan Publishers
- Website: www.macmillaneducation.com

Macmillan Education is a publishing imprint and business which has been owned by various divisions and companies of the Macmillan publishing group and, more recently, the Springer Nature group which is jointly owned by Holtzbrinck Publishing Group and BC Partners. The company that runs the imprint is based in London and operates in over 120 countries worldwide. As of 2023, Macmillan Education is focused mainly on materials and services for language learning (mostly English) and for teaching international curricula in schools worldwide.

== History ==
Macmillan Education was created as an imprint and division of the broader Macmillan publishing business in the UK in the early 1970s. In 1994 it became legally framed within Macmillan Education Ltd, a company in the Macmillan group. During the 1990s, while the overall Macmillan group became acquired by the Holtzbrinck family, Macmillan Education increased its multinational presence, setting up offices in several countries in Eastern Europe, the Middle East and South America. Expansion also involved the acquisition of Heinemann ELT in 1998, and new publishing initiatives including Macmillan Open Learning (supplying educational programmes), the MOTIVATE series of vocational training texts, and the College Essential Histories.

In 2011 Macmillan Publishers Ltd was fined GBP 11.3 million by the High Court in London, in respect of gains through corruption by Macmillan Education in East and West Africa between 2002 and 2009. Subsequently, Macmillan Education stopped operating in East and West Africa.

Macmillan Education Ltd was dissolved at the end of 2014, prior to the 2015 merger of most of Macmillan Science and Education with Springer Science+Business Media, forming Springer Nature as a subdivision of the Holtzbrinck Publishing Group. While remaining within the Springer Nature subgroup, Macmillan Education was in 2019 again placed in a UK company under its own name.

As of 2023, the Macmillan Education business is based in London and operates in over 120 countries worldwide. It is focused mainly on producing materials and services for language learning (mostly English) and for teaching international curricula in schools worldwide.
