= Droemer Knaur =

Publishing group based in Munich

- Industry: Publishing house
- Founded: 1846; 180 years ago
- Founder: Theodor Knaur
- Headquarters: Munich, Germany
- Key people: Bernhard Fetsch; Hans-Peter Uebleis; Josef Röckl
- Owner: Holtzbrinck Publishing Group
- Website: www.droemer-knaur.de

Droemer Knaur is a publishing group based in Munich. The group consists of the book publishers Droemer, Knaur, the Pattloch Publisher and O.W. Barth. Droemer Knaur belongs to the Georg von Holtzbrinck Publishing Group.

== Program ==
Droemer Knaur Publishing publishes novels and nonfiction from German and international authors. Through the broad ranged publishing program and the publication of bestselling authors like Johannes Mario Simmel and Sebastian Fitzek, Droemer Knaur became one of the most prestigious publishing houses for fiction in Germany. In the category of popular fiction, historical novels, detective stories, thrillers, fantasy and romantic literature are published. In the category non-fiction are among others, biographies, guides, esotericism and conspiracy theories are published. They also publish international bestselling authors for the German market and sell licenses to German authors all over the world.

== History ==
The origins of the publishing house lie in the Leipzig steam bookbinding Theodor Knaur, which dates back to 1846. After many individual publications, the Theodor Knaur publishing house had its first regular program in 1884. The publishing house was sold to the Berlin bookseller Gabriel Hendelsohn in 1901, and renamed the Theodor Knaur Nachf. Verlag.

In 1902 Adalbert Droemer came to the publisher as publishing representative. In 1934 the Jewish Hendelsohn brothers fled Nazi persecution and emigrated to the United States and Droemer took over the publishing house. Two years later, Droemer's son Willy Droemer, became part of the publisher's management and succeeded his father after Adalbert Droemer's death in 1939. In October 1939 Theodor Knaur Nachf. published its Knaurs Welt-Atlas with maps that represented the greater German Reich and the lands recently annexed and conquered by the Nazis. In 1943, the company offices and printing presses were destroyed by Allied bombing.

After the end of World War II, Willy Droemer founded the publisher as the new Droemersche Verlagsanstalt, in Schloss Wiesentheid (Unterfranken), which soon after moved to Munich.

Starting in 1970, Willy Droemer and Georg von Holtzbrinck worked together and exchanged company shares. In 1980, the publishing group Georg von Holtzbrinck took over the publishing completely and Droemer withdrew from the management. In 1982, the publishing house took over the Kindler Verlag.

Since 1999, the Droemer Knaur Publishing group was owned as joint venture half by the Georg von Holtzbrinck publishing group and half by Weltbild. 2013 Holtzbrinck group took ownership completely. In the same year, the Pattloch Publisher was integrated into the Droemer Knaur publishing group. The Pattloch-Verlag was founded in 1946 in Aschaffenburg and was part of Weltbild publishing group since 1987. In the Pattloch publishing, nonfiction books appear from renowned scientists and journalists on social issues. With the authors Manfred Lütz and Raphael M. Bonelli began a tradition of psychotherapeutic bestsellers.

The Droemer Knaur publishing group was no. 1 among the best-selling publishers in 2005 and 2006, according to the bestseller list of Der Spiegel / book report.

Since 2008 Droemer Knaur also publishes e-books. In 2009, the PAN-Verlag was founded, which existed until 2012. In 2010, O. W. Barth Verlag (previously S. Fischer Verlag) was taken over. O.W. Barth was founded in 1924 in Munich and was sold to the Scherz Verlag in Bern in 1973. With this, it was acquired by S. Fischer in 2002. The O.W. Barth Verlag describes itself as a publisher of spiritual literature focusing on Eastern wisdom teachings, holistic healing systems and nonfiction, at the intersection between science and spirituality.

Also in 2010, the online platform neobooks.com was founded and in 2011 the Droemer Paperback.

In October 2024, Droemer Knaur founded the romantasy and romance label Bramble Germany, which publishes German editions of the American Bramble publishing house as well as translated light novels from East Asia. The program includes romance and romantasy bestsellers alongside discoveries from China, Japan, and Korea.

Among the best-known fiction authors of the publishing group include Iny Lorentz, Sebastian Fitzek, Anne Hertz, Sabine Ebert and Andreas Franz. Also known international writers like Karen Rose, Val McDermid, John Katzenbach or Michael Connelly are part of the program.
