= Love and Honor (2013 film) =

- Theaterical release poster
- Directed by: Danny Mooney
- Screenplay by: Jim Burnstein; Garrett K. Schiff
- Produced by: Chip Diggins; Patrick Olson
- Starring: Liam Hemsworth; Austin Stowell; Teresa Palmer; Aimee Teegarden; Chris Lowell
- Cinematography: Theo van de Sande
- Edited by: Glenn Garland
- Music by: Alex Heffes
- Distributed by: Lighting Entertainment; IFC Films
- Release date: March 22, 2013 (United States); (Limited release)
- Running time: 96 minutes
- Country: United States
- Language: English
- Box office: $16,769

Love and Honor is a 2013 romantic drama film directed by Danny Mooney. It is Mooney's feature-film directorial debut. The film, based on a true story of a Michigan soldier, takes place during the Vietnam War and is set in Ann Arbor and surrounding areas. The story follows a soldier who, after being dumped by his girlfriend, decides to return home secretly from war with his best friend to win her back.

== Plot ==
In 1969, at the time of the Apollo 11 mission, American soldier Dalton Joiner, fighting in the Vietnam War, uses his time of R&R supposed to be spent in Hong Kong, to fly back to the United States to re-capture the heart of his girlfriend Jane. Fellow soldier Mickey Wright accompanies him. Jane now calls herself Juniper, and is a member of a group of anti-war activists. Joiner and Wright pretend they are AWOL, and are admired by the group for that, until it is revealed that they plan to return in time. Juniper breaks up (again) with Joiner, which makes him decide to flee to Canada. Wright falls in love with Candace, but returns to Vietnam.

== Cast ==
- Liam Hemsworth as Mickey Wright
- Austin Stowell as Dalton Joiner
- Aimee Teegarden as Juniper / Jane
- Teresa Palmer as Candace
- Chris Lowell as Peter Goose
- Max Adler as Burns
- Wyatt Russell as Topher Lincoln
- Delvon Roe as Isaac

== Production ==
The film was shot in and around Ann Arbor, Michigan from July 11 to August 12, 2011. A scene was also filmed in Ypsilanti, Michigan.

The international sales rights were acquired by Lightning Entertainment in May 2012. Lighting Entertainment intended to premiere the film for international buyers at the Cannes Film Market held in May 2012.

== Reception ==
On the review aggregator website Rotten Tomatoes, 14% of 14 critics' reviews are positive. Metacritic, which uses a weighted average, assigned the film a score of 28 out of 100, based on 9 critics, indicating "generally unfavorable" reviews.

== See also ==
- "Jennifer Juniper"
