= Patrick Olson =

Musician and performer Patrick Olson

Patrick Olson is an artist and businessman. He founded Hayden-McNeil, now a subsidiary of Macmillan Publishers. In 2022, he wrote and starred in the performance art piece, Emergence.

== Career ==
Olson founded Hayden-McNeil, based in Plymouth, Michigan in 1992. It published custom-made materials for schools and student bodies including "textbooks, lab manuals, and curriculum supplements across a range of subject areas and for colleges and universities." Macmillan Publishers acquired Hayden-McNeil in 2008.

In 2004 he opened the Patrick Olson Gallery.

Olson co-produced the 2013 film Love and Honor, originally titled AWOL.

In 2021, Olson released his first album Music For Scientists. Olson lists Arctic Monkeys and The Rolling Stones as well as the New Wave movement and performance artists of the 1980s as influences.

=== Emergence: Things Are Not As They Seem ===
In 2022, Olson performed Emergence: Things Are Not As They Seem at the El Portal Theatre in Los Angeles. The show transferred to Pershing Square Signature Center in October 2023 for a three-month Off-Broadway run.

Emergence was a collection of spoken-word monologues about the human experience featuring art, science and music. During an interview with New York Live, Olson described the show as "[bringing] art and science together into some kind of intersection."

Doctor Gary Small reported in Psychology Today that Patrick Olsen's work "reminded [him] that although [he] might not ever be able to answer those big questions, [he] thoroughly enjoyed pondering them."

Heavily influenced by Talking Heads, Emergence has been likened to American Utopia by David Byrne due to "the jerky staccato moves and probing questions that evoke the lyrics of Talking Heads’ 1980 hit “Once in a Lifetime”."
