= Heinemann (publisher) =

British book publisher

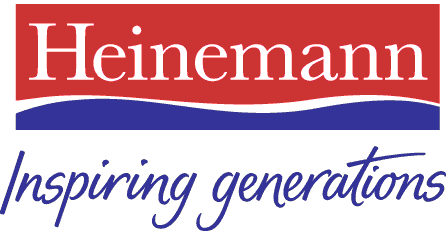
- Parent company: Houghton Mifflin Harcourt
- Founded: 1890; 136 years ago
- Successor: Pearson Education (UK education); Hutchinson Heinemann (UK trade); Macmillan Education (ELT); Houghton Mifflin Harcourt (US education); HarperCollins (UK children's); Capstone Publishers (school libraries)
- Country of origin: United Kingdom
- Headquarters location: Portsmouth, New Hampshire (US)
- Official website: heinemann.com

William Heinemann Ltd, with the imprint Heinemann, was a London-based publisher founded in 1890 by William Heinemann. Their first published book, 1890's The Bondman, was a huge success in the United Kingdom and launched the company. He was joined in 1893 by Sydney Pawling. Heinemann died in 1920 and Pawling sold the company to Doubleday, having worked with them in the past to publish their works in the United States. Pawling died in 1922 and new management took over. Doubleday sold his interest in 1933.

Through the 1920s, the company was well known for publishing works by famous authors that had previously been published as serials. Among these were works by H. G. Wells, Rudyard Kipling, W. Somerset Maugham, George Moore, Max Beerbohm and Henry James, among others. This attracted new authors to publish their first editions with the company, including Graham Greene, Edward Upward, J. B. Priestley and Vita Sackville-West. Throughout, the company was also known for its classics and international catalogue, and in the post-WWII era, the company focused on educational materials.

Through the 1950s, the company was slowly taken over by Tilling Group's investment arm. In 1953 they opened offices in The Hague for sales in continental Europe, and in 1978 they opened a separate company in Portsmouth, New Hampshire to sell their educational works in the US market. When Tilling was purchased by BTR plc in 1983, BTR sold off all their non-industrial assets; Heinemann was sold to Octopus Publishing Group. Octopus merged with Reed International (later Reed Elsevier) in 1987, who then sold their entire trade-oriented publishing assets to Random House in 1997. Heinemann ELT (English Language Teaching) division was sold to Macmillan Education in 1998. Eventually, the rest of international division was sold to Pearson Education and the US division (including Heinemann USA, merged with the Greenwood Press operations also acquired by Reed) to Houghton Mifflin Harcourt in 2007. Most of these successors (with exception of Macmillan Education) continue to use the Heinemann imprint.

== History ==
William Heinemann began working in the publishing industry under Nicolas Trübner, who was a major publisher of what was called Oriental scholarship. When, two years after Trübner's death, his company was taken over by the firm of Kegan Paul, Heinemann left and founded William Heinemann Ltd in Covent Garden, London, in 1890. The first title published was Hall Caine's The Bondman, which was a "stunning success", selling more than 450,000 copies. The company also released a number of works translated into English under the branding of "Heinemann's International Library", edited by Edmund Gosse. In 1893, Sydney Pawling became a partner. They became known for publishing the works of Sarah Grand. The company published the British version of Scribners' Great Educators series under the title Heinemann's Great Educators series, but did not include credits for the original American editor, Nicholas Murray Butler, an omission for which they were criticized.

Between 1895 and 1897, Heinemann was the publisher of William Ernest Henley's periodical New Review. In the late 1890s, Heinemann and the American publisher Frank Doubleday financially supported Joseph Conrad during his initial attempt at writing what eventually became The Rescue, and Heinemann was the British publisher for Conrad's The Nigger of the 'Narcissus' in 1897. One of the company's businesses at that time was to sell English books to a Japan that was beginning to be interested in items of Western culture. Heinemann sold to the Japanese bookstore Maruzen translations of the works of Dostoyevsky and 5000 copies of Mutual Aid: A Factor of Evolution by Peter Kropotkin. In 1912, the company began publishing the Loeb Classical Library series, publications of ancient works with the Greek or Latin text on the left-hand page, and a literal translation on the right hand page. The series has been called "the most significant" of the parallel-text translations. Since 1934, it has been co-published with Harvard University.

On Heinemann's death in 1920 a majority stake was purchased by U.S. publisher Doubleday, with Theodore Byard, who had previously been a professional singer, joining to lead the offices.

A subsidiary company was established in The Hague in 1953; originally intended to distribute works in English to continental Europe, it eventually began to directly print Heinemann's books as well.

The company was later acquired by conglomerate Thomas Tilling in 1961. When the impending takeover became known, Graham Greene (who had been with Heinemann since his first work in 1929) led a number of Heinemann authors who protested by taking their works to other publishers, including The Bodley Head, of which Greene was a director.

Heinemann Publishing was established in the United States in 1978 as a U.S. subsidiary of Heinemann UK. Heinemann published books for school teachers of language arts K–12 and continues to this day.

BTR bought Thomas Tilling in 1983, and were not interested in its publishing division, so Heinemann was put on the block. Heinemann was purchased by the Octopus Publishing Group in 1985, and shortly afterwards sold the sprawling Heinemann HQ in rural Kingswood, Surrey for development; Octopus was purchased by Reed International (now Reed Elsevier) in 1987. Heinemann Professional Publishing was merged with Butterworths Scientific in 1990 to form Butterworth-Heinemann. Random House bought Heinemann's trade publishing (now named William Heinemann) in 1997. Egmont Group bought Heinemann's children's publishing and Macmillan Education bought Heinemann ELT in 1998. Remaining Heinemann's educational unit became part of Harcourt Education when Reed Elsevier purchased the company in 2001. Pearson purchased the UK, South African, Australian and New Zealand arms of Harcourt Education in May 2007, while Houghton Mifflin purchased the American operations a few months later. Pearson sold the school library publisher Heinemann-Raintree to Capstone Publishers in 2008. Egmont Group sold its UK book division to HarperCollins in 2020. Penguin Random House merged William Heinemann with Hutchinson to form Hutchinson Heinemann in 2021.

In 1957, Heinemann Educational Books (HEB) created the African Writers Series, spearheaded by Alan Hill and West Africa specialist Van Milne, to focus on publishing the writers of Africa such as Chinua Achebe, who was the first advisory editor of the series. Heinemann was awarded the 1992 Worldaware Award for Social Progress. The series was relaunched by Pearson in 2011.

Inspired by the African Writers Series, Leon Comber launched the Writing in Asia Series in 1966 from Singapore. Two Austin Coates books in the series, Myself a Mandarin and City of Broken Promises, became bestsellers, but the series, after publishing more than 70 titles, was to fold in 1984 when Heinemann Asia was taken over by a parent group of publishers.

In 1970, the Caribbean Writers Series—modelled on the African Writers Series—was launched by James Currey and others at HEB to republish work by major Caribbean writers.
