= Sydney Pawling =

English cricketer

- Born: 6 February 1862; Wallingford, UK
- Died: 23 December 1922 (aged 60); Eastbourne, UK
- Occupation: Cricketer

Sydney Southgate Pawling (6 February 1862 – 23 December 1922) was an English first-class cricketer active in 1894 who played for Middlesex. He was born in Wallingford; died in Eastbourne.

Pawling's uncle and guardian was Charles Mudie, proprietor of Mudie's Circulating Library, and Pawling worked at Mudies from the age of 15. In 1893 he became a partner in the publishing house of William Heinemann, and he remained the minority partner until his death, when tributes were paid to his solid business acumen.

Pawling was a stalwart of Hampstead Cricket Club and at one time reputed to be the fastest bowler in England. It was said that on one occasion he matched himself against Fred Spofforth, the Australian fast bowler, in bowling across the County Ground at Essex. Spofforth's ball apparently reached the rails, but Pawling's did so and also rebounded back three yards.
