= Hayden-McNeil =

Publishing company

Hayden-McNeil Publishing
- Parent company: Macmillan Publishers
- Founded: 1992; 33 years ago
- Founder: Patrick Olson
- Country of origin: United States
- Headquarters location: Plymouth, Michigan
- Publication types: Custom Textbooks, Digital Products, and Carbonless Lab notebooks
- Official website: hmpublishing.com

Hayden-McNeil Publishing is an American publishing company headquartered in Plymouth, Michigan that is a publisher of college and university level custom educational materials in the United States. It has been a subsidiary of Macmillan Learning since 2008.

== History ==
Founded by Patrick Olson in 1992, Hayden-McNeil Publishing is located in Plymouth, Michigan. Macmillan Publishers acquired Hayden-McNeil Publishing in 2008, providing for future growth through access to Macmillan's content, educational technology, and distribution assets.

== Expanded Custom Program ==
In May 2015, Hayden-McNeil Publishing announced the expansion of their custom publishing service to courses with enrollment as low as 200.
