= Harald Martenstein =

German journalist and author

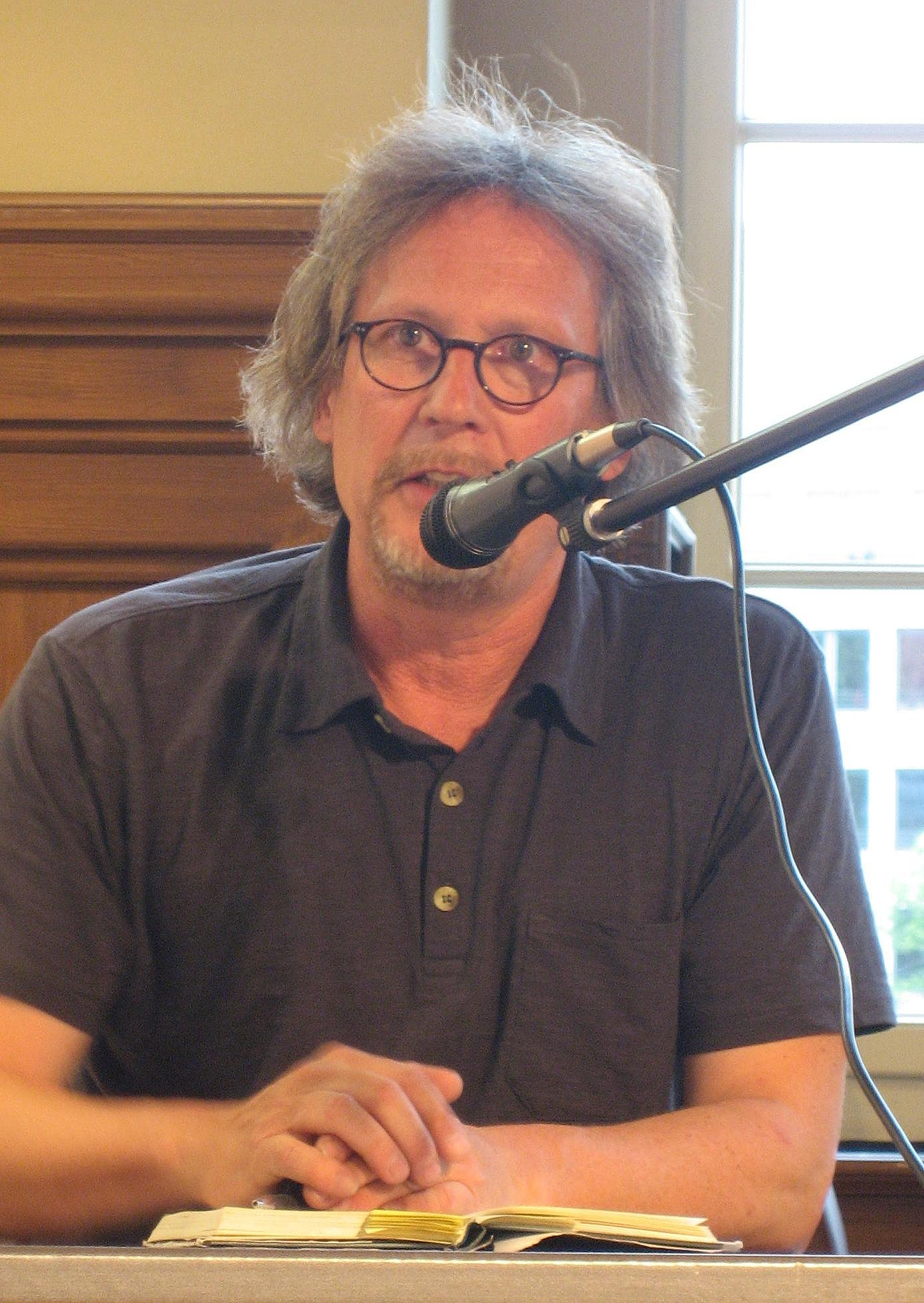
Martenstein in 2008

Harald Martenstein (born 9 September 1953, in Mainz) is a German journalist and author.

== Biography ==
Martenstein studied History and Romance Studies in Freiburg. From 1981 to 1988, he was a journalist at the Stuttgarter Zeitung and from 1988 to 1997 he was a journalist at Tagesspiegel in Berlin. Then, Martenstein took up for a short time the line of the culture editorship at the Abendzeitung (AZ) in Munich. However, he returned a little later as senior editor to the Tagesspiegel. Since 2002, he has written a column for Die Zeit titled "Lebenszeichen", which since May 24, 2007 appears in Zeit-Magazin LEBEN (a supplement to Die Zeit) as "Harald Martenstein". Since 2004 Martenstein also writes a column for GEO Kompakt. His second novel, Gefühlte Nähe (Felt close) received rather critical reviews.

In 2004, he received the Egon-Erwin-Kisch-Preis for the second best investigative report published in German in 2004. Martenstein had dealt with the internal conflicts in Suhrkamp, a major publisher of literary works with longstanding legal conflicts between its owners.

In February 2007, Martenstein's novel debut Heimweg was released and later won the Corine Debütpreis. He has also published several volumes of his collected columns under different titles.

In 2026, he was awarded the Deutscher Sprachpreis.

Martenstein lives in Berlin-Kreuzberg.

== Works (selection) ==
- Männer sind wie Pfirsiche. C. Bertelsmann, München, 2007, ISBN 978-3-570-00961-1
- Heimweg. Roman, C. Bertelsmann, München, 2007, ISBN 978-3-570-00953-6
- Vom Leben gezeichnet. Tagebuch eines Endverbrauchers. Hoffmann und Campe, Hamburg, 2004.
- Wachsen Ananas auf Bäumen? Wie ich meinem Kind die Welt erkläre. Hoffmann und Campe, Hamburg 2001.
- Spot aus! Licht an! Meine Story, zus. mit Ilja Richter, Hoffmann und Campe, Hamburg 1999.
- Das hat Folgen. Deutschland und seine Fernsehserien. Reclam, Leipzig 1996.
- Die Mönchsrepublik. Erotik in der deutschen Politik von Adenauer bis Claudia Nolte. Fannei & Walz, Berlin 1994.
