= Barack Obama: Der schwarze Kennedy =

2007 German biography of Barack Obama

Barack Obama - Der schwarze Kennedy
- Author: Christoph von Marschall
- Language: German
- Subject: Barack Obama
- Genre: Biography
- Publisher: Orell Füssli
- Publication date: 2007
- Publication place: Germany
- Media type: Hardcover
- ISBN: 978-3-280-06108-4
- OCLC: 254783705

Barack Obama – Der schwarze Kennedy (English: Barack Obama – The black Kennedy) is a best-selling German-language biography of President of the United States Barack Obama by journalist Christoph von Marschall. The book was written by Marschall while he spent much of 2007 travelling with Barack Obama 2008 presidential campaign as a reporter for the Berlin newspaper Der Tagesspiegel. It covers Obama's life from his childhood, through his college years, his time as a community organizer in Chicago, Illinois, and his political career including his 2008 presidential campaign. Marschall sums up his impressions of Obama by saying, "Seine Lebensgeschichte steht für den amerikanischen Traum." ("His life story stands for the American Dream.")

The title of the book, which implies a close similarity between Obama and John F. Kennedy, seemed gimmicky to some people when it was published in December 2007. However, in the following months many other Germans compared the two men and expressed hope that an Obama presidency would bring better relations between the United States and Europe. Kennedy is very popular in Germany, with many recalling his famous statement, "Ich bin ein Berliner" ("I am a Berliner") – given in West Berlin in 1963 at the height of the Cold War. Steffen Hallaschka, a moderator for Germany's NDR TV, said: "Germans in the '60s projected a lot of hope and fantasies on Kennedy. This is what they are doing with Obama."

Barack Obama – Der schwarze Kennedy has been credited with helping to inspire interest in and support for Obama among people in Germany, with "der schwarze Kennedy" becoming a popular expression. Marschall, however, has pointed out in some interviews that Obama's Democratic Party primary rival Hillary Clinton and her husband, former President Bill Clinton, are also popular in Germany and in the rest of Europe.
