= Christoph von Marschall =

German journalist

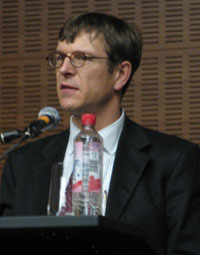
Christoph von Marschal speaking in Frankfurt, Germany

Christoph von Marschall (born 1959) is a German journalist working for the daily Berlin newspaper Der Tagesspiegel. He is currently titled the diplomatic correspondent of the newspaper's editorial offices.

During the period 2005 to 2013 he was the only German in the White House press corps. Again in 2017–2018 he reported on the White House from Washington, D.C.

== Biography ==
Christoph von Marschall was born in 1959 in Freiburg im Breisgau. From there, he studied Eastern European history and political science in Freiburg, Mainz, and Kraków, and earned a doctorate in Eastern European history from Freiburg University in 1988. Soon afterwards, he became a foreign correspondent in Hungary for the Süddeutsche Zeitung and remained in this job until 1991. While there, he also worked for the Deutschlandfunk radio service and the magazine Cicero. In 1999, Marschall was awarded a Kellen Fellowship that enabled him to spend one month working at The New Republic and a further month at The Wisconsin State Journal.

In 2002, Marschall received the George F. Kennan German-American Commentary Award of the Foreign Office for a commentary post related to the terrorist attacks of September 11, 2001.

In 2007, Marschall wrote a book about the presidential candidate Barack Obama, Barack Obama: Der schwarze Kennedy. The literal translation of its German title is "Barack Obama. The Black Kennedy". The book was a best seller in Germany, where other commentators had also compared Obama with John F. Kennedy.

In 2007 and 2008 Marschall covered the Obama campaign for the German newspaper Der Tagesspiegel. He was often interviewed in the American press about Obama's popularity in Europe. Towards the end of the campaign he wrote an op-ed column in The Washington Post in which he complained about the lack of access Obama had granted to foreign journalists.

His latest book, published in German in 2018, is titled "Wir verstehen die Welt nicht mehr. Deutschlands Entfremdung von seinen Freunden", and deals with current German foreign policy in relationship to its European and transatlantic allies.
