= Arkansas Broadcasters Association =

American group representing radio and television stations

The Arkansas Broadcasters Association represents 210 radio stations and 33 television stations licensed in the US state of Arkansas. The ABA represents the interests of these stations on both the state and federal level. The ABA also monitors legislation being considered and works closely with the state legislature as well as both of Arkansas' United States Senators and all four congressmen. Most member services are funded by stations' participation in the NCSA program, in which non-profit and governmental agencies partner with the ABA to extend the reach of on-air public education messages.
