= Obama On My Mind =

Musical play by Teddy Hayes

Obama on my Mind is a musical play about the 2008 presidential campaign of Barack Obama by British crime writer and film producer Teddy Hayes.

The play is a campaign story set the week after the 2008 Republican National Convention.

Reviews were strongly negative. Lyn Gardner, a British reviewer wrote a critical review in The Guardian after having seen the show at the Hen and Chickens Theatre, describing the musical as "opportunistic", and as a "bizarrely unfocused text - an apparently unedited stream of consciousness".

One year later, the play was taken to Seattle Washington and staged at the Langston Hughes Theater where it was positively reviewed, championed and supported by African American audiences as a piece of entertainment that reflected both the humour as well as all of the events surrounding the surprise of an African American being elected as US president. The theater news website, BroadwayWorld described the play as a "politically inspired comedic romp featuring a motley crew of loyal, obsessive and downright peculiar personalities, striving to get their candidate into the White House."
