= Georg von Holtzbrinck =

German publisher (1909–1983)

George von Holtzbrinck (11 May 1909 – 27 April 1983) was a German publisher and founder of Georg von Holtzbrinck Publishing Group.

== Biography ==
He was born in Schöplenberg, Hagen on 11 May 1909. In 1931, Holtzbrinck joined the Nazi Young Workers. In 1933, he became member number 2,126,353 of the Nazi Party.

With his partner, August-Wilhelm Schlösser, Holtzbrink formed a book club business in the 1930s. Their business prospered under the Nazis. With a letter of recommendation from Adolf Hitler's private office obtained by Schlösser, their company Deutsche Verlagsexpedition (Devex), secured a contract with the German Labor Front (DAF), the largest and financially strongest Nazi mass organization with 25 million members. "Devex" distributed the DAF magazines Schönheit der Arbeit and Freude und Arbeit.

Holtzbrinck's Nazi past was successfully concealed for many years until major acquisitions in the United States by the Holtzbrink Publishing Group aroused curiosity about the accuracy of the company's official history. In June 1998, Vanity Fair published a feature article on Holtzbrink and Bertelsmann entitled "The German Front" or "Ich Bin Ein Book Person" that explored the publishers' Nazi-era activities.

Holtzbrinck had three young children with his wife Addy von Holtzbrinck (born in Griesenbeck on 13 February 1913, died in Rummenohl in 2005): Georg-Dieter, Karin Monika and Stefan, who is current CEO of Holtzbrinck Publishing Group.

Holtzbrinck died on 27 April 1983 in Stuttgart.

== Awards ==
- Order of Merit of the Federal Republic of Germany
- 1952: Decoration of Honour for Services to the Republic of Austria

== Bibliography ==
- Thomas Garke-Rothbart: "... für unseren Betrieb lebensnotwendig ..." Georg von Holtzbrinck als Verlagsunternehmer im Dritten Reich Saur, München 2008 ISBN 9783598249068 (zugl. Diss. phil. Fernuniv. Hagen)
  - Rezension: Thomas Schuler: Ein Onkel in der SS. Belege opportunistischen Verhaltens in: Süddeutsche Zeitung 30. Januar 2009, S. 15.
  - Rezension: Florian Triebel: Trotz guter Quellenarbeit noch viele Fragen offen, IASLonline, 29. September 2009.
