= Deutscher Fachverlag =

Deutscher Fachverlag GmbH
- Founded: 1946
- Headquarters: Frankfurt, Germany
- Revenue: €133.3 million (2011)
- Number of employees: 890 (2011)
- Website: www.dfv.de

The Deutsche Fachverlag (acronym: dfv) is a publishing company with subsidiaries and shareholdings in Germany and abroad. It publishes about 90 trade publications, more than 90 digital offers as well as specialized books. Seminars, conventions, trade fairs as well as symposiums round off the programme.

== History ==
Wilhelm Lorch founded the publishing house in Stuttgart in September 1946 under the name "Neuer Fachverlag". It was not until 1948 when it moved to Frankfurt that the publishing company was renamed "Deutscher Fachverlag". The first specialist periodical was released in the founding year: TextilWirtschaft. Since then, dfv has continuously expanded its range of publications and enlarged it by means of numerous start-ups, purchases and shareholdings. Today the publishing group has a presence in six countries and distributes its products worldwide.

== Subsidiaries and shareholdings ==
In Germany the publishing house holds 100% of the shares of the publishing companies and cooperations Online GmbH, Deutsche Fachmedien GmbH, IBP-International Business Press Publishers GmbH, Verlag für Wirtschaftspraxis GmbH (head offices all in Frankfurt) and Matthaes Verlag GmbH based in Stuttgart.

dfv is a majority shareholder of IZ Immobilien Zeitung Verlagsgesellschaft mbH in Wiesbaden, The Business Target Group GmbH based in Scheeßel near Hamburg and The Conference Group GmbH based at the head office in Frankfurt.

Further shares are held from the Agrarmarkt Informations-Gesellschaft mbH in Berlin, the XAD Service GmbH in Munich and the dfv association services gmbh based in Frankfurt.

International subsidiaries are Edizioni Ecomarket S.p.A. based in Milan and Manstein Zeitschriftenverlagsgesellschaft m.b.H. located in Perchtoldsdorf near Vienna. Dfv is a 100% shareholder of all these three companies. Apart from that dfv is a major shareholder of VFP Communications Ltd. Sp. z o.o. in Warsaw and holds shares of Images Multimedia Pvt. Ltd. based in New Delhi, India. Further international publishing co-operations exist in China, Russia and Hungary.

== Business areas ==
dfv is operating in the following business areas: trade journals, trade books, digital media products, events, Corporate Publishing, market research and telemarketing as well as media statistics. The publications Lebensmittel Zeitung, TextilWirtschaft, HORIZONT and AHGZ are among the 10 trade journals in Germany with the most advertising turnover.

== Foundations ==
The Deutsche Fachverlag has initiated three industry-specific foundations: in 1988 the Wilhelm-Lorch-Stiftung, the foundation Goldener Zuckerhut in 1990 and the HORIZONT-Stiftung in 2006. They are to serve as youth development foundations and are there to honour special achievements of young talents in the textile- and food industry as well as the communications and agency business.
