= Farm Neck Golf Club =

Golf club in Oak Bluffs, Massachusetts

Coordinates: 41°26′15″N 70°34′11″W

Club information
- Location: 1 Farm Neck Way; Oak Bluffs, Massachusetts, U.S.
- Established: 1979; 47 years ago
- Type: Semi-private
- Tota holes: 18
- Website: www.farmneck.net

Farm Neck Golf Club
- Designed by: Geoffrey Cornish
- Par: 72
- Length: 6,815 yards
- Course rating: 72.8

Farm Neck Golf Club is a semi-private golf club located in Oak Bluffs, Massachusetts, United States. In the 1970s, a real estate company named Strock Enterprises intended to create a golf course and housing developments on a peninsula within the town but locals felt they were not maintaining a conservationist ethic. The Supreme Judicial Court of Massachusetts ruled against Strock which soon thereafter went bankrupt. Farm Neck Associates then bought the territory and created a golf course with the intent to preserve the environment. The 18-hole course has earned plaudits from notable publications and hosted President Clinton and President Obama while on vacation.

== History ==
In the 1970s, a real estate company named Strock Enterprises began development plans to create a golf course and several hundred housing lots. The plans were approved by the Oak Bluffs Planning Board in 1974. However, there was resistance from locals, especially lawyers Charles Harff and Bob Fullem, who thought the developers did not intend to preserve the natural environment. According to Mr. Harff and Mr. Fullem, the goal was "to save a pristine corner of Martha's Vineyard from over-development." The Martha's Vineyard Commission (MVC) reacted and "froze the plans." The Supreme Judicial Court of Massachusetts upheld MVC's decision. Strock Enterprises then soon went bankrupt.

In 1978, a group of investors known as Farm Neck Associates purchased the territory with the intent to marry development with a conservationist ethic. The following year, construction of the course began. Farm Neck was designed by "prominent New England golf course architect" Geoffrey S. Cornish. On July 3, 1980, the course opened. The course was created out of a territory that used to be a farm and is located on a peninsula, or "neck," which is how the club got its name. Shortly after the course was completed, 85 acres were donated to Felix Neck sanctuary. The club has also collaborated with the National Audubon Society over the course of its history.

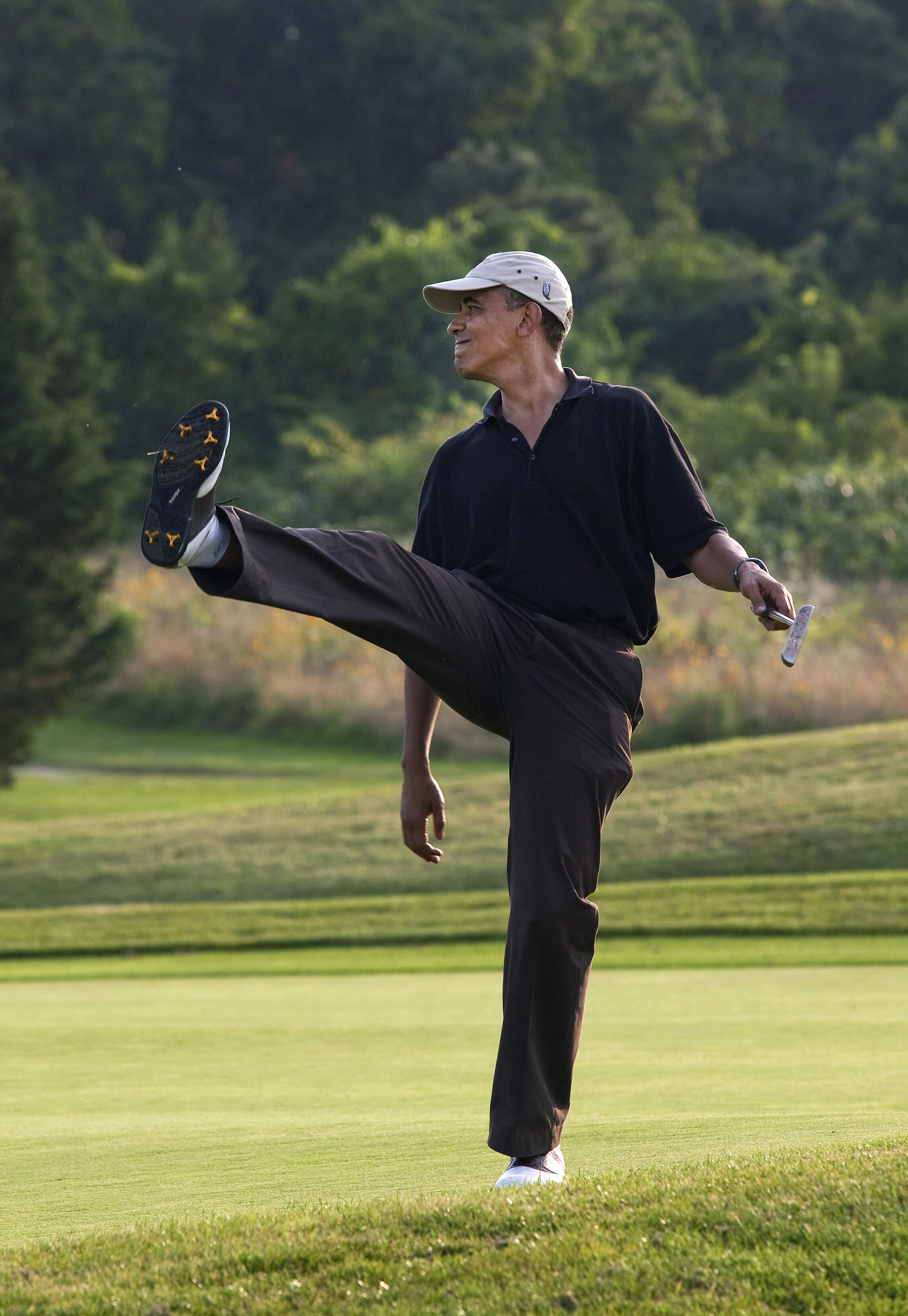
President Barack Obama playing golf at Farm Neck Golf Club, August 24, 2009. Official White House photo.

The course has received much media attention for hosting presidents of the United States on their summer vacation. In the 1990s, President Bill Clinton played the course several times over the course of the decade. During his presidency, while on vacation on the Vineyard, President Barack Obama played the course.

The popularity of Farm Neck has exploded since President Clinton's first visit. Due to this surge in popularity, however, it is now very difficult for a non-member to earn a tee time. By the early 21st century, Farm Neck offered "restricted public play." It is also very difficult to earn membership. During this era, there were over 850 people on a waiting list. According to Lisa Reagan, the co-owner, "Right now, the only way to get a Farm Neck membership is to put your name on a list."

According to Boston Magazine, the course was the top public course in the state of Massachusetts in 2003. Farm Neck has also earned good reviews from Golf Digest. The magazine has regularly awarded the course 4.5 out of 5 stars and has labeled it one of the top "Places to Play" in the northeastern United States.

== Scorecard ==
Farm Neck Golf Club
| Tee | Rating/Slope | 1 | 2 | 3 | 4 | 5 | 6 | 7 | 8 | 9 | Out | 10 | 11 | 12 | 13 | 14 | 15 | 16 | 17 | 18 | In | Total |
| Par | | 4 | 5 | 4 | 3 | 4 | 3 | 4 | 5 | 3 | 35 | 4 | 5 | 4 | 4 | 4 | 3 | 4 | 4 | 5 | 37 | 72 |
| SI | (Men) | 2 | 8 | 18 | 16 | 14 | 12 | 6 | 4 | 10 | | 5 | 11 | 1 | 15 | 17 | 13 | 9 | 3 | 7 |
| Gold | M: 72.8/135 W:78.6/140 | 409 | 528 | 362 | 173 | 351 | 207 | 391 | 512 | 200 | 3,133 | 426 | 557 | 404 | 365 | 348 | 188 | 424 | 418 | 552 | 3,682 | 6,815 |
| Blue | M: 70.5/133 W:75.4/137 | 378 | 490 | 340 | 157 | 325 | 189 | 371 | 486 | 175 | 2,911 | 376 | 519 | 379 | 343 | 331 | 163 | 388 | 368 | 523 | 3,390 | 6,301 |
| White | M: 69.3/129 W:74.6/132 | 362 | 470 | 324 | 139 | 296 | 150 | 342 | 453 | 155 | 2,691 | 344 | 498 | 355 | 320 | 306 | 138 | 362 | 357 | 488 | 3,168 | 5,859 |
| Green | M: 65.7/125 W:70.7/127 | 357 | 427 | 319 | 134 | 291 | 125 | 312 | 363 | 150 | 2,498 | 296 | 431 | 310 | 315 | 301 | 133 | 288 | 295 | 435 | 2,804 | 5,282 |
| Red | W: 68.4/121 M:64.3/118 | 320 | 422 | 296 | 116 | 245 | 120 | 307 | 358 | 125 | 2,309 | 291 | 426 | 305 | 246 | 265 | 137 | 283 | 290 | 411 | 2,654 | 4,963 |
| SI | (Women) | 4 | 2 | 8 | 14 | 10 | 12 | 6 | 18 | 16 | | 9 | 7 | 3 | 17 | 15 | 11 | 13 | 5 | 1 |
