= Holtzbrinck Publishing Group =

German publishing conglomerate

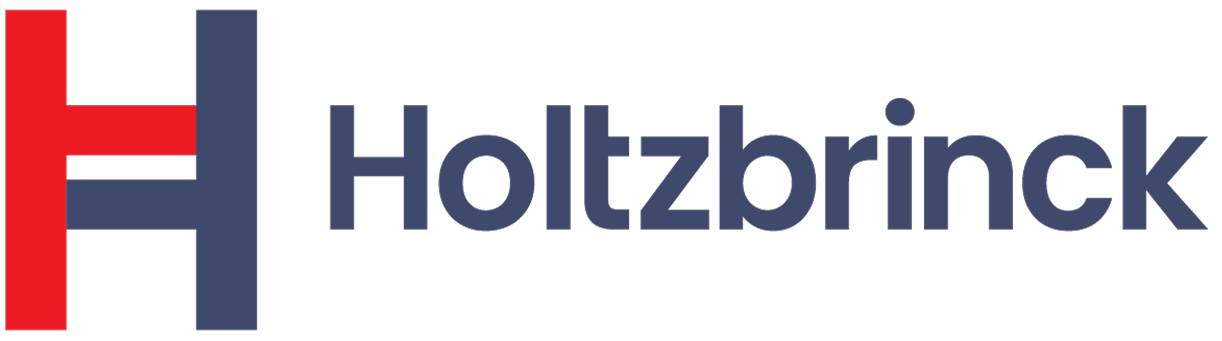
- Parent company: Georg von Holtzbrinck GmbH & Co. KG
- Status: Private
- Founded: 1948; 78 years ago
- Founder: Georg von Holtzbrinck
- Country of origin: Germany
- Headquarters location: Stuttgart, Germany
- Distribution: Worldwide
- Key people: Stefan von Holtzbrinck (CEO) Björn Waldow (CFO) Filmon Zerai (COO)
- Publication types: Books, Newspapers, Academic journals, Magazines
- Imprints: See below
- Official website: holtzbrinck.com

Holtzbrinck (German: Georg von Holtzbrinck GmbH & Co. KG) is a German publishing company headquartered in Stuttgart, that owns publishing companies worldwide. Through Macmillan Publishers, it owns one of the Big Five English-language publishing companies.

In 2015, it merged most of its Macmillan Science and Education unit (including Nature Publishing Group) with Springer Science+Business Media, creating the company Springer Nature. Holtzbrinck owns 53% of the combined company.

== History ==
The history of Georg von Holtzbrink's publishing activities during the Nazi years 1933-1945 has been controversial. After World War II, Georg von Holtzbrinck, a former member of the Nazi party, reestablished a group in 1948, beginning as a German book club. In the 1960s, it purchased the German publishing companies Droemer, Kindler, Rowohlt and S. Fischer Verlag. In 1985, it acquired the retail book division of Holt, Rinehart and Winston, naming it the Henry Holt Book Company. One year later, the company acquired Scientific American magazine for $52.6 million. In 1994, it purchased a majority interest in Farrar, Straus & Giroux from retiring Roger W. Straus, Jr. A year later, it purchased a 70% majority interest in Macmillan Publishers, and then the remaining shares in 1999. In 2001, Pearson sold the Macmillan trademark in the United States (gained with the acquisition of Simon & Schuster educational and professional division, which included the assets of former Macmillan Inc.) to Holtzbrinck.

In March 2006, Holtzbrinck forced Tor Books, which is owned by Holtzbrinck, to stop making its books available as e-books via Baen Ebooks because of concerns regarding the lack of digital rights management (DRM). The policy was later changed and Tor titles became available as DRM-free e-books in 2012. The Tor UK label in Britain (and hence the EU) does the same. The company also received a good deal of attention when it bought the then leading German social networking platform StudiVZ in January 2007.

Holtzbrinck has total annual sales of 1.99 billion euros (as of 2024); 29% of sales are in Germany and 53% in North America. It had 2024 earnings before taxes of 293 million euros, and a total of 14,000 employees.

The current chairman of the group is Stefan von Holtzbrinck. Jon Yaged is CEO of Macmillan, which represents the group's trade publishing activities, primarily in the US.

== Subsidiaries and imprints ==
German newspaper Die Zeit in newsstand

The publishing group is divided into four business areas:

1. Science: This area comprises scientific publications and research-related services, particularly through Springer Nature and Digital Science.
2. Consumer Books: The books segment includes the group’s trade publishing activities, including Macmillan Publishers, Pan Macmillan, and the German Holtzbrinck book publishers.
3. Education: The education segment is represented by Macmillan Learning, which develops educational content and digital learning solutions.
4. News Media: This area comprises the group’s journalistic activities, which are bundled in DIE ZEIT Publishing Group.

In Germany:

- S. Fischer Verlag
  - FISCHER Krüger
  - Argon Verlag
  - FISCHER Scherz
- Rowohlt Verlag
- Kiepenheuer & Witsch (85%)
- Verlagsgruppe Droemer Knaur (50%)
  - O.W. Barth
- Die Zeit (50%)

In the United States:
Using the Macmillan name:

- Farrar, Straus and Giroux
  - Faber & Faber (formerly; ended partnership in 2015)
- Henry Holt and Company
  - Holt Paperbacks
  - Metropolitan Books
  - Times Books
  - Owl Books
- Palgrave Macmillan
- Picador
- Roaring Brook Press
  - Neal Porter Books
  - First Second Books
- St. Martin's Press
  - Thomas Dunne Books
- Tom Doherty Associates
  - Tor Books
  - Forge Books
- Bedford, Freeman and Worth Publishing Group
  - W.H. Freeman
  - Bedford-St. Martin's
  - Worth Publishers
  - Macmillan Learning
- Hayden-McNeil
- Nature Publishing Group

Former in the United States:

- Renaissance Media - was based in Los Angeles when its catalogue was acquired by Holtzbrinck in 2001
  - Renaissance Books - assets and back catalogue fully merged into Holtzbrinck's St. Martin's Press, which formerly provided the book printing service for Rennaissance
  - Audio Renaissance - renamed Macmillan Audio when Holtzbrinck switched to Macmillan name in the United States
- Scientific American, until June 2026

In the United Kingdom:

- Macmillan Publishers
  - Pan Macmillan
    - Macmillan
    - Pan Books
    - Picador
    - Macmillan Children's Books
    - Campbell Books
    - Priddy Books
    - Boxtree
    - Sidgwick & Jackson
  - Macmillan Education
- Springer Nature (53%)
  - Palgrave Macmillan
- Digital Science

== See also ==
- The Big Five English-language book publishers: Simon & Schuster, Penguin Random House, HarperCollins, Macmillan Publishers, and Hachette
- Springer Nature
- Books in Germany
- Bertelsmann
- Elsevier
- Lagardère Publishing
- McGraw Hill Education
- Pearson plc
- News Corp
- Scholastic Corporation
- Thomson Reuters
- Wiley (publisher)
