= Dieter von Holtzbrinck =

German publisher (born 1941)

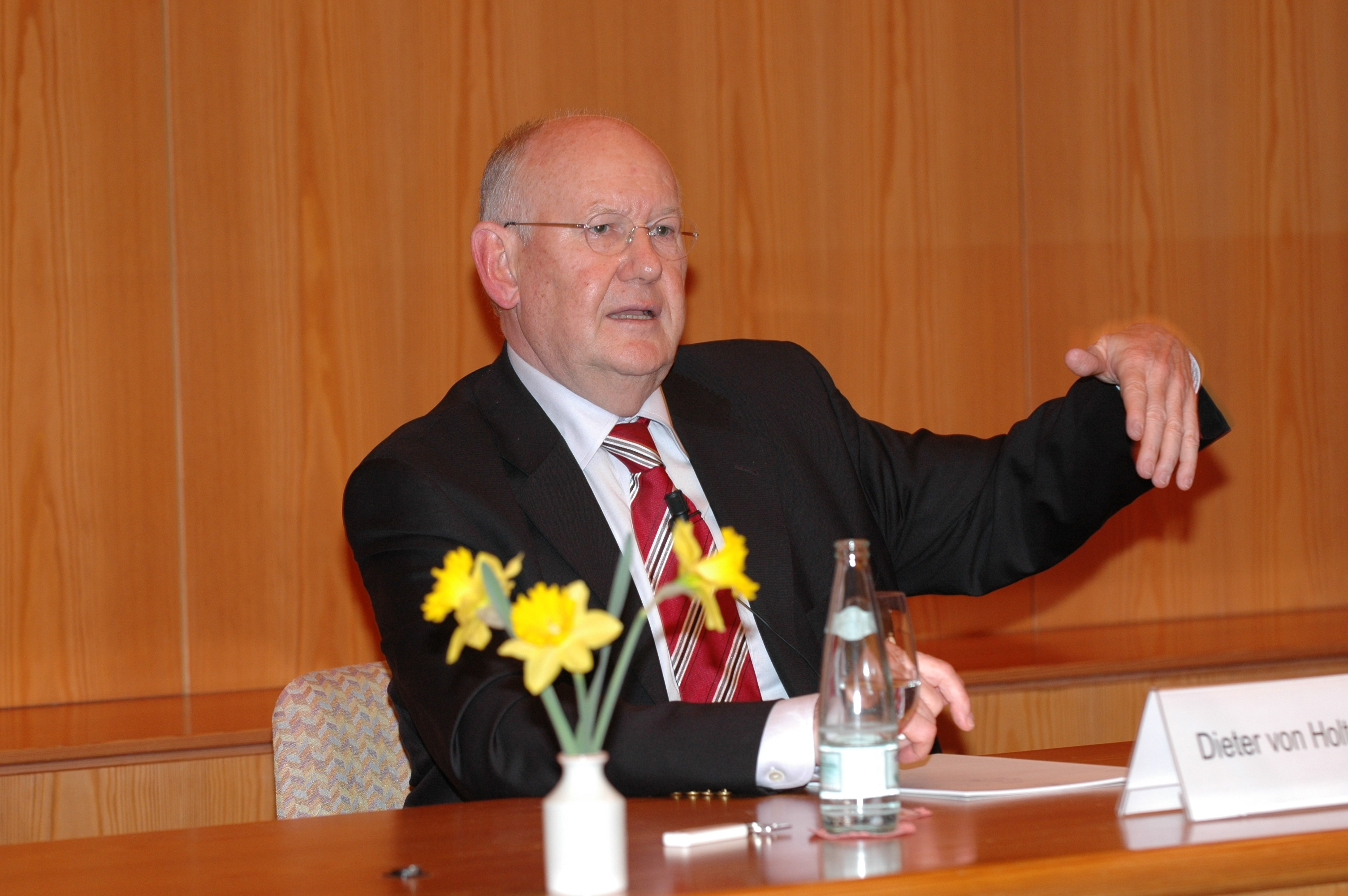
Dieter von Holtzbrinck at the Lilienberg Business Forum, 2007

Dieter von Holtzbrinck (born 29 September 1941 in Stuttgart) is one of the heirs to the Holtzbrinck publishing empire, founded by his father Georg von Holtzbrinck (1909–1983) in 1948. In 2006, his wealth was estimated at around US$1 billion.

He was a director of Dow Jones & Co. Inc., until he resigned on 19 July 2007, showing his disagreement with the takeover of the company by Rupert Murdoch's News Corp.

== Biography ==
Dieter von Holtzbrinck is the elder son of the publisher and entrepreneur Georg von Holtzbrinck (1909–1983) and his wife Addy von Holtzbrinck, née Griesenbeck (1913–2005). His sisters were Monika Schoeller (1939–2019) and Karin von Holtzbrinck (1943–2006). Stefan von Holtzbrinck (born 1963) is his half-brother.

Holtzbrinck studied economics at the University of St. Gallen and completed an eighteen-month publishing internship in the USA. In 1970, he joined Handelsblatt GmbH as managing partner. This belonged to his father Georg von Holtzbrinck's publishing group, who founded the media company in 1931 and led it to success during the Nazi era. In 1980, he took over from his father as chairman of the entire publishing group. In 2001, he handed over operational management to his 22-year-younger half-brother Stefan von Holtzbrinck and took over as chairman of the supervisory board.

In mid-2006, Dieter von Holtzbrinck retired from the company. He began gradually transferring his assets to a family foundation. At this time, his private wealth was estimated at 1.0 billion US dollars. With this, he ranked 54th in the list of the richest Germans in 2006. The Forbes list of the world's richest people in 2010 ranked him 828th with assets of 1.3 billion US dollars.

In 2007, Dieter von Holtzbrinck unsuccessfully tried to acquire the Süddeutsche Zeitung with investors.

On June 1, 2009, Dieter von Holtzbrinck sold his shares in the publishing group to his half-brother Stefan and his sister Monika Schoeller, each now holding 50 percent. In return, Dieter von Holtzbrinck took the influential national daily newspapers into his newly founded Dieter von Holtzbrinck Medien GmbH (DvH Medien): all shares in the Handelsblatt publishing group, which also includes the prestigious magazine Wirtschaftswoche, the Tagesspiegel group, and 50 percent of the publisher of the weekly newspaper Die Zeit, the operational management of which was taken over by DvH Medien. The daily newspapers with only regional significance (Saarbrücker Zeitung group) initially remained with the Verlagsgruppe Georg von Holtzbrinck.

Until Rupert Murdoch's entry in 2007, Holtzbrinck was a member of the Corporate Governance Committee of the board of directors of the US publisher Dow Jones. With his resignation, Holtzbrinck protested against the takeover by Murdoch. He had been a member of the committee since 2001.

== See also ==
- Georg von Holtzbrinck Publishing Group
- (in German) de:Dieter von Holtzbrinck Medien
- List of billionaires
