= I Did That! =

Phrase found on fuel pumps

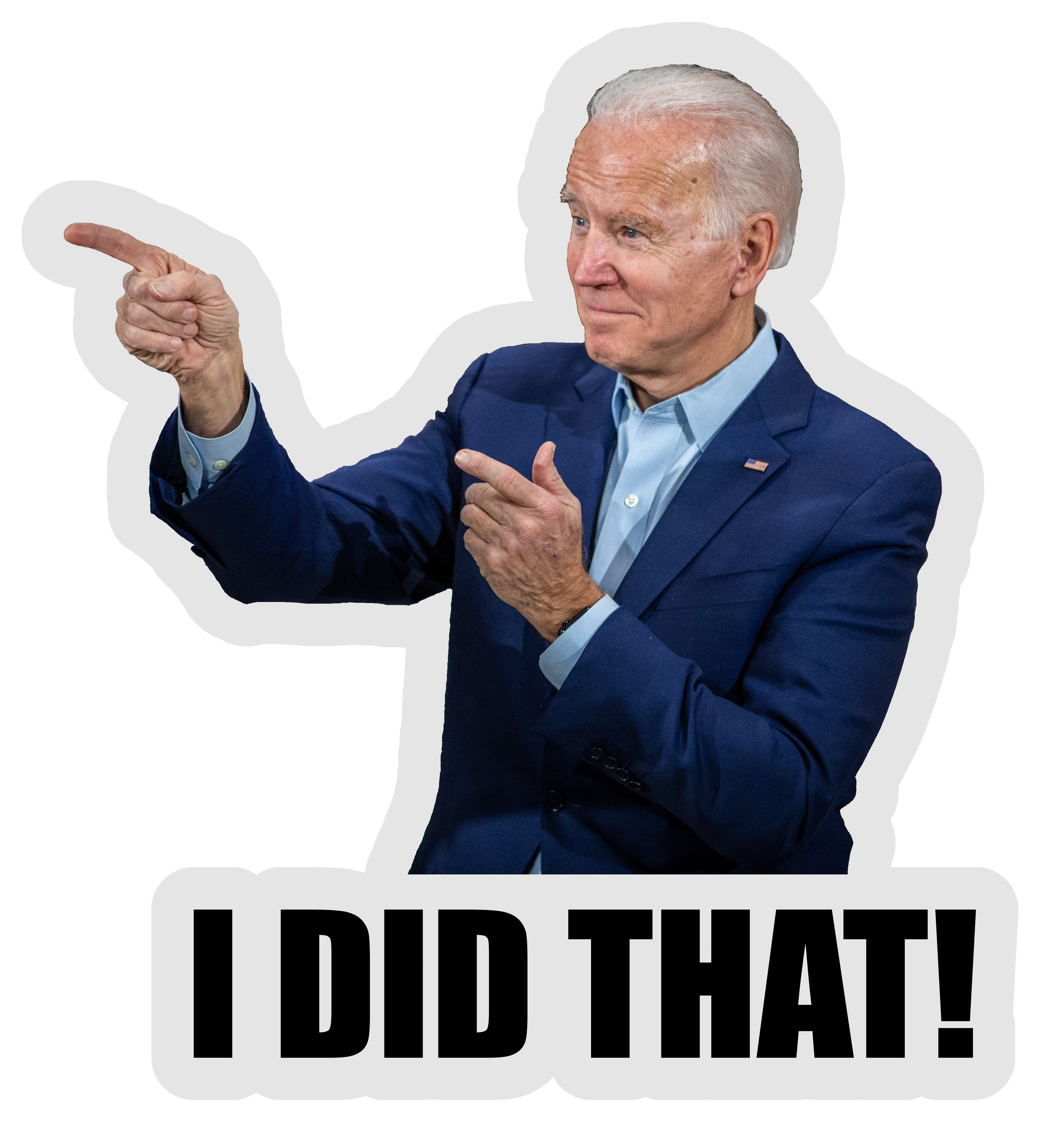
"I Did That!" sticker

"I Did That!" is a phrase found on stickers picturing the U.S. president pointing at the price of gasoline on fuel pumps in gas stations around the United States. During the Biden administration, the stickers were a form of political activism, asserting that his policies led to a rise in fuel prices. The stickers have also been placed on empty store shelves. After price increases near the beginning of the second Trump administration, similar parody stickers have been placed in grocery stores with a photo of Trump pointing and the caption.

== History ==
The stickers began appearing in 2021 and increased in popularity as the price of gasoline and other goods contributed to the 2021–2023 inflation surge.

In December 2021, Minnesota representative Pete Stauber, the ranking member of the United States House Natural Resources Subcommittee on Energy and Mineral Resources, appeared before a virtual committee hearing with an "I Did That!" poster in the background.

In May 2022, oil multinational BP withheld a quarterly bonus from a gas station owner in the state of Wisconsin because she told employees not to remove the "I Did That!" stickers from fuel pumps. The station owner told Fox News host Jesse Watters, "They go back up as fast as you knock them down. So why keep fighting the battle?"

On May 18, 2022, Ted Cruz suggested that Biden was to blame for higher gasoline prices, saying, "I'll tell you what, the little stickers on gas pumps all across the country illustrate the American people know exactly whose fault this is."

In June 2022, Business Insider said the stickers were "perhaps the most ubiquitous and successful piece of political propaganda that the counterculture right has produced", and they are infused with "a kind of joyful, Yippiesque delight in causing public mischief on behalf of a greater cause".

=== Trump parody stickers ===
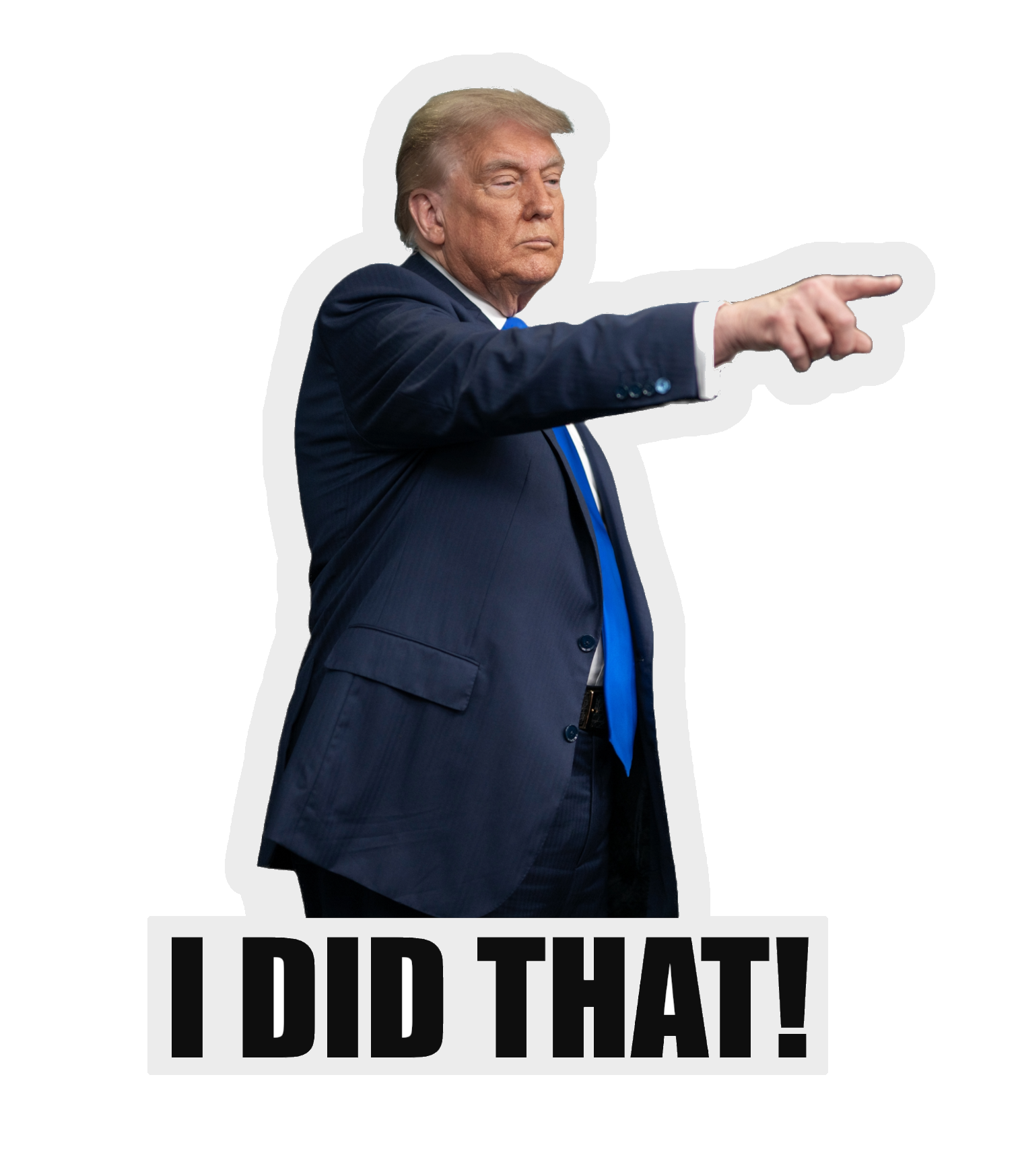
An example of an "I Did That!" sticker with Donald Trump

After price increases near the beginning of the second Trump administration, similar parody stickers have been placed in grocery stores with a photo of Trump pointing and the "I Did That!" caption.

Stickers crediting Trump with sharply rising gas prices following the start of the 2026 Iran war have also been placed on gas pumps, appearing to parody the stickers depicting former President Biden several years earlier. In response to concerns about rising gas prices, Trump replied "If they rise, they rise."

== Source of stickers ==
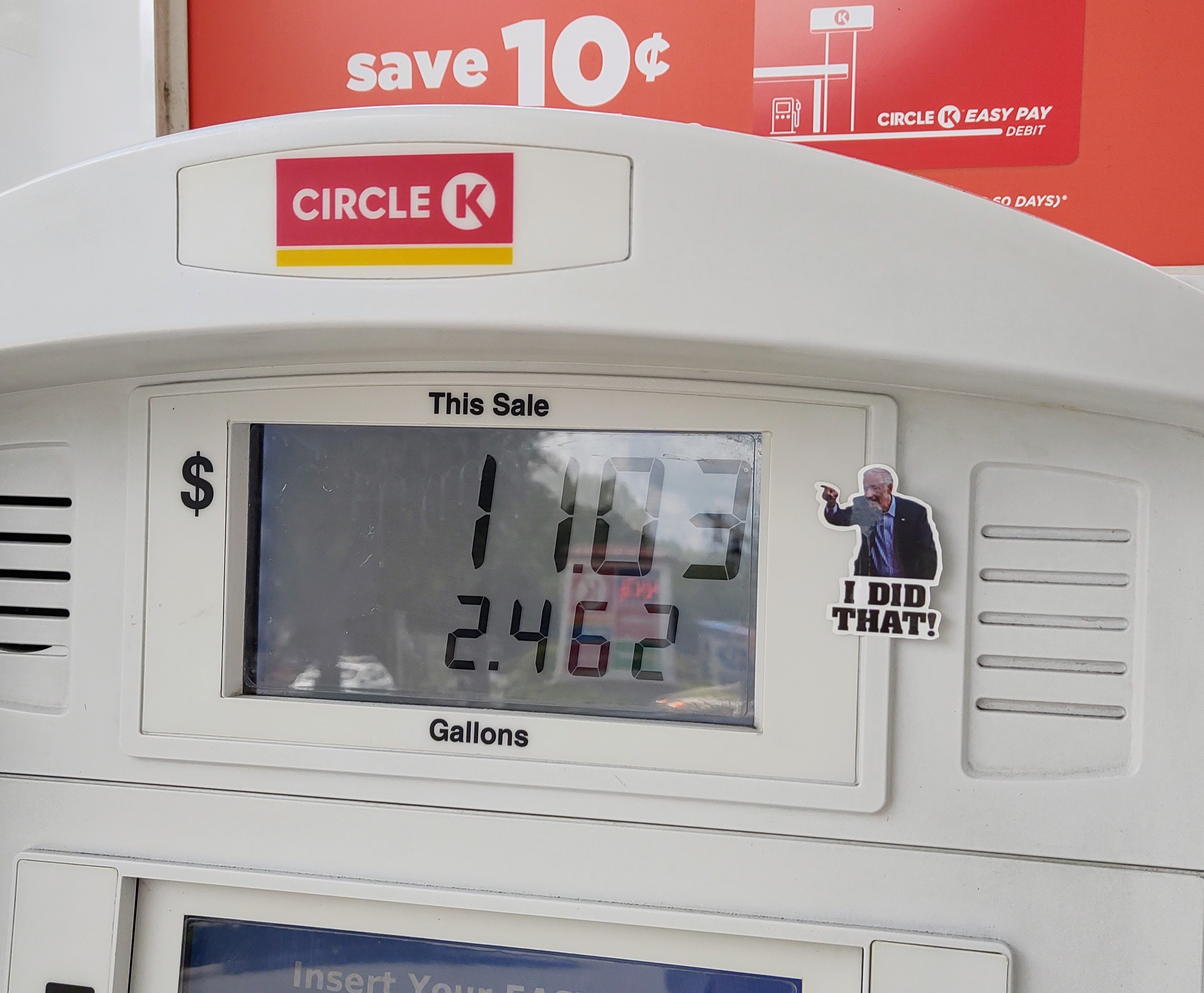
An "I Did That!" sticker on a gas pump

The stickers are sold online by dozens of vendors, and one retailer estimated he had $40,000 in sticker sales in August 2021. The placement of these stickers on private property are considered to be a form of vandalism. Some gas station owners and employees complained that the stickers make some customers angry and are difficult to remove.

The stickers are sold by hundreds of Amazon and other platform sellers for as low as $5.99 for 100. In June 2022, over 600 Etsy sellers are offering the Biden stickers. Variations of the sticker also exist, such as Vice President Kamala Harris saying, "And I Helped!", and Donald Trump saying, "I Can Fix That."

== Commentary ==
In January 2022, NPR's Planet Money published a commentary piece by Greg Rosalsky arguing that it would be more accurate to put a "COVID did that" sticker on a fuel pump rather than the "Biden did that" sticker because the world is struggling to overcome the effects of the COVID-19 pandemic that disrupted the supply chain part of the economy. The piece also acknowledged that it is legitimate to debate if Biden's 1.9 trillion dollar American Rescue Plan contributed to inflation in the US.

Commentator Charles Hurt related this to former President Obama's 2012 comment that successful business owners "didn't build that".

In June 2022, the CEO of the Illinois Fuel Retailers Association, Josh Sharp, said the stickers are a nuisance and even a form of vandalism. In regards to the cause of the price increase, Sharp said, "(President Biden's) canceled infrastructure projects like Keystone. I think we agree with folks about that (but) we would prefer they refrain from putting those stickers on the pumps. It's an issue for my members. They don’t like it."

== See also ==
- It's Joever
- Let's Go Brandon
- Miss Me Yet?
- Sticker art
