= Label 228 =

Type of sticker issued by the United States Postal Service

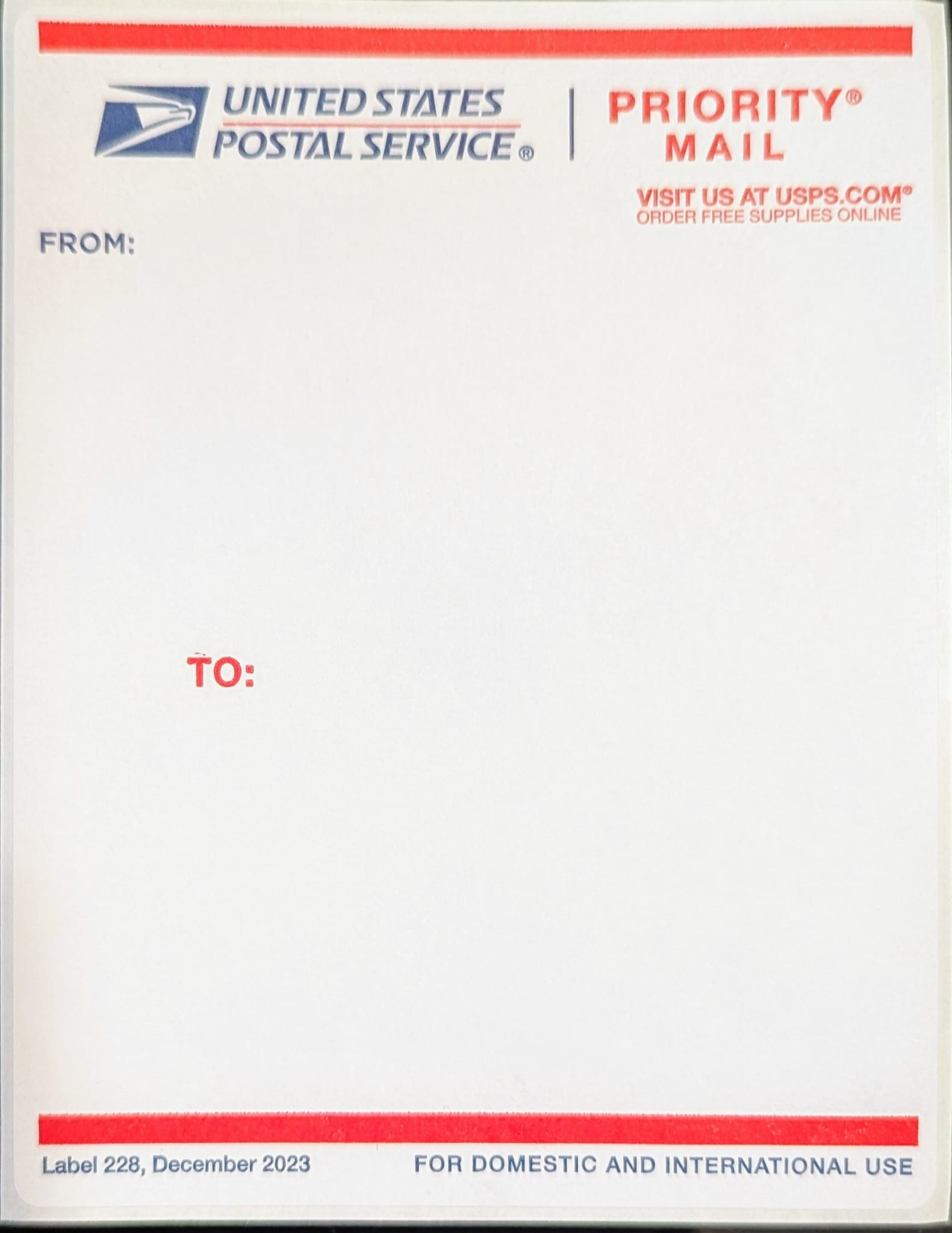
December 2023 version of Label 228

Label 228 is a sticker issued by the United States Postal Service for labeling Priority Mail packages with a mailing address. Label 228 is available free of charge at all USPS Post Office locations or delivered by mail when ordered online.

Due to the widespread availability of Label 228, and the relatively large areas of blank space within the design, it has been widely used in sticker art and graffiti more commonly known as "slaps". Unlike many other stickers and labels, Label 228 is free, and can be acquired in large quantities. It can be drawn on using many different artistic media, including acrylic paints and simple pencils, as well as inkjet and laser printers. They can also be applied to many surfaces very quickly, reducing the risk of being caught.

== History ==
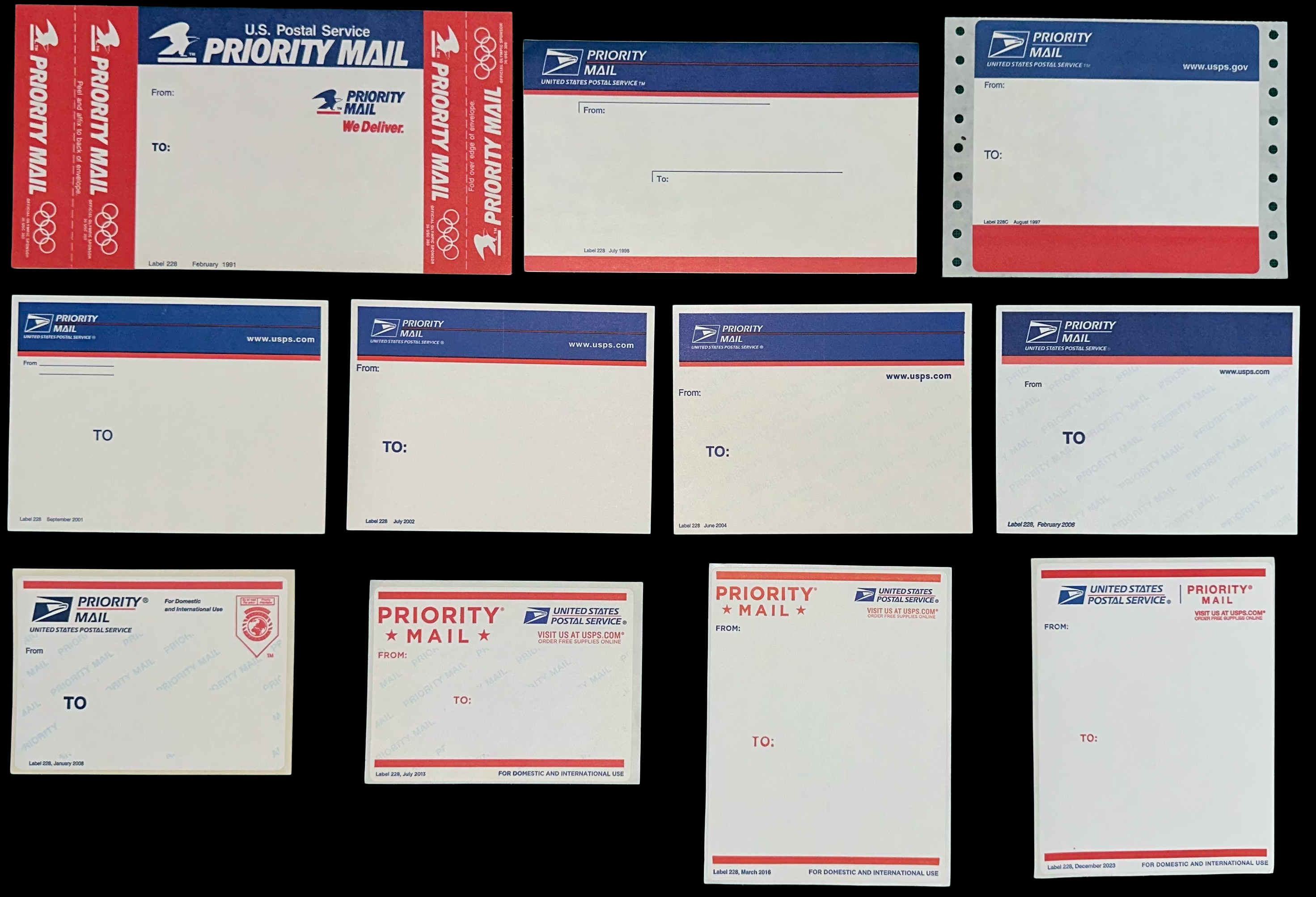
Original version and several redesigns of USPS Label 228

The United States Post Office Department introduced Priority Mail service in 1968. The Post Office Department was replaced by the United States Postal Service in 1971, and when Special Delivery service ended in 1997, Priority Mail and its counterpart Priority Mail Express became the fastest services offered by the Postal Service. In its intended use, Label 228 is a Priority Mail address label, for use on domestic and international packages. The first USPS label designated as "label 228" had an Olympic-themed design and was released in February 1991, both as a regular label as well as a version with tractor-feed holes intended for use in printers.

Photojournalist Martha Cooper first saw stickers used for graffiti in the 1980s, using commercial name tags. According to Cooper, graffiti artists switched to Priority Mail labels because of their large size, broad availability, and stickiness. Label 228 also provided opportunities for commentary on the government, although some artists remove the USPS logos for the opposite effect.

Label 228 likely became popular for graffiti in the late 1990s. Hrag Vartanian of Hyperallergic argues that by 2002, "the culture of the postal sticker was well established in the world of graffiti," and a 2002 compilation of graffiti stickers shows Label 228 slaps from 2001 in multiple locations in the United States.

The label was redesigned many times over the years, including in 1992, 1994, 1995, 1996, 1997, 1999, 2000, 2001, 2002, 2004, 2006, 2008, 2013, 2016, and 2023. As of 2023, there have been at least 27 distinct versions of the label.

One of the key redesigns was in 2016, when the label adopted a vertical format, intended to reduce misdirected packages. Some sticker artists continued to prefer the 1998 design of Label 228, a horizontal design featuring a large white space and a blue band at the top.

== See also ==
- Culture jamming
- Graffiti
- "Hello my name is" stickers
- Sticker art
