= Edomoji =

Edo-period Japanese typefaces

Edomoji (Japanese: 江戸文字; えどもじ) (or edo-moji) are Japanese typefaces invented for advertising during the Edo period. The main styles of edomoji are chōchinmoji, found on paper lanterns outside restaurants; higemoji, used to label kakigōri and drinks like ramune and sake; kagomoji, literally "cage letters"; kakuji, a thick and rectangular seal script; kanteiryū, often used on flyers for performances such as kabuki and rakugo; and yosemoji, a mix of chōchinmoji and kanteiryū.

== Chōchinmoji ==

Chōchinmoji (提灯文字) characters are the ones used on chōchin (hanging paper lanterns), such as the ones commonly seen outside yakitori stands in Japan.

== Higemoji ==

Higemoji (髭文字) characters have little "whiskers" (hige) on them. This style is used for kakigōri and ramune signs as well as being a common style for sake labels. While this gyosho-esque script appears fluid and spontaneous, it follows a strict ruleset based on the Chinese-originating "7–5–3 pattern". The brushstrokes must appear as seven distinct bristle lines, with narrower passages requiring five, and three as the stroke terminates.

== Kagomoji ==

Kagomoji (籠文字) literally means "cage letters". The characters are thick and square in shape. It is usually used in inverted form or sometimes as an outline.

== Kakuji ==

Kakuji (角字) is a very heavy, rectangular style used for making seals and inspired from folded-style Mongolian traditional script.

== Kanteiryū ==

Kanteiryū (勘亭流), also known as kantei or shibaimoji (芝居文字), is a style is used for publicity and programmes for arts like kabuki and rakugo. Invented by Okazakiya Kanroku (岡崎屋 勘六), the name derives from Okazaki's nickname, kantei (勘亭).

=== Kabukimoji ===
Kabukimoji is a style specifically associated with kabuki.

=== Sumōmoji ===

Sumōmoji (相撲文字), also known as sumōji or chikaramoji, is a style used for sumo wrestling advertisements and programmes.

== Yosemoji ==

The name Yosemoji (寄席文字; lit. "letters for yose") is used in Japanese theater. A combination of kanteiryū and chōchinmoji, it was used for posters and flyers, as well as in rakugo performances (e.g. mekuri), nafuda, and nobori. Unlike other calligraphic styles, yosemoji allows and even encourages multiple brushstrokes in order to fill in the characters as much as possible.
