= Obey (clothing brand) =

American clothing company

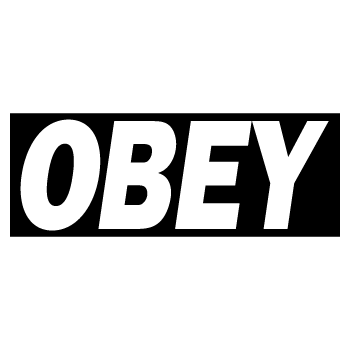
- Type: Private
- Industry: Clothing
- Genre: Streetwear
- Founded: 2001; 25 years ago
- Founder: Shepard Fairey
- Headquarters: Irvine, California, U.S.
- Area served: Worldwide
- Products: General apparel for men and women
- Brands: Obey Giant, Studio number one, Subliminal projects
- Website: obeyclothing.com

Obey Clothing (stylized in all caps) is an American streetwear company founded in 2001 by street artist and illustrator Shepard Fairey.

== History ==
The logo and image that the brand is most associated with dates back to an image Fairey created in 1989 which was an image of Andre the Giant with the text reading "Andre the Giant Has a Posse". The brand's name is a reference to the John Carpenter film They Live.

The brand has collaborated with Keith Hufnagel's HUF and Levi Strauss, as well as with artists Cope2 and Keith Haring, singer Debbie Harry, and zine Pavement Licker.

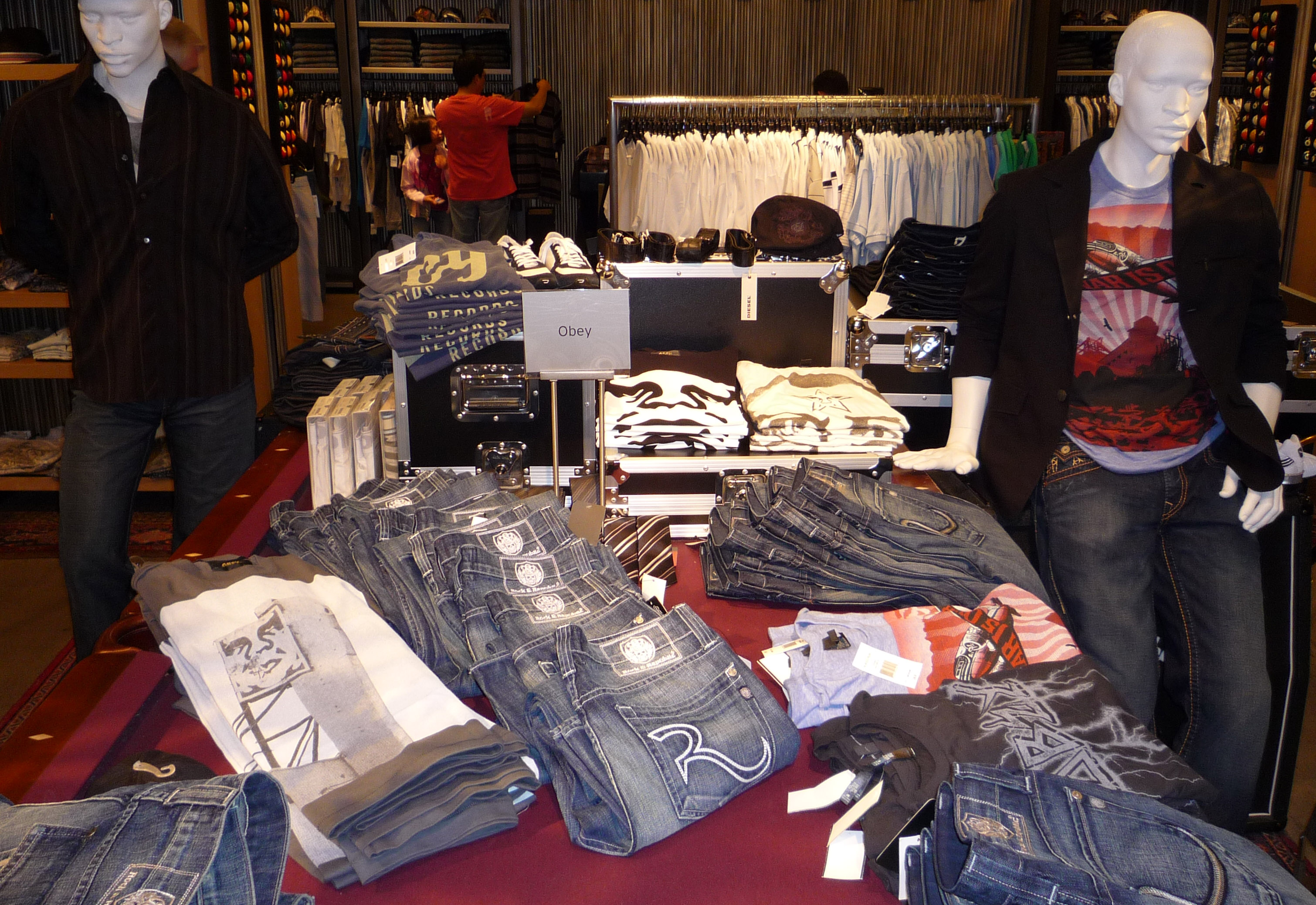
Obey clothing for sale, 2008

The brand has diminished in popularity following the mid-2010s, but is still active, with the FW18 collection release attempting to reestablish the brand. On April 21, 2016, Mike Ternosky—Obey's head designer—received the 2016 Spirit of Design Award, an annual fashion design accolade given by Thomas Jefferson University. From May 16 to October 27, 2024, the brand was displayed at the Fabbrica del Vapore in Milan, at an exhibition dedicated to Fairey, titled "Obey: The Art of Shepard Fairey". In spring and summer 2022, the respective collection depicted fiestas. In early 2023, furniture company Helinox collaborated with Obey, creating six pieces of portable furniture.
