= Andre the Giant Has a Posse =

Street art campaign by Shepard Fairey

The "André the Giant has a Posse" sticker on a stop sign. First created in the summer of 1989, this version is a copy of that original sticker. This sticker was photographed in Brooklyn, New York, in 2004.

OBEY Giant image stenciled on a building wall in Athens, Greece. 2009

Andre the Giant Has a Posse is a street art campaign based on a design by Shepard Fairey created in 1989 while Fairey attended the Rhode Island School of Design in Providence, Rhode Island. Distributed by the skater community and graffiti artists, the stickers featuring an image of André the Giant began showing up in many cities across the United States. At the time, Fairey declared the campaign to be "an experiment in phenomenology". In 1996 Fairey altered the image of André the Giant and changed the text to read OBEY, which Fairey has described as being a "transition ...into something that had more of an Orwellian connotation". It is this new image with the text "OBEY" which has become a worldwide phenomenon.

== History ==
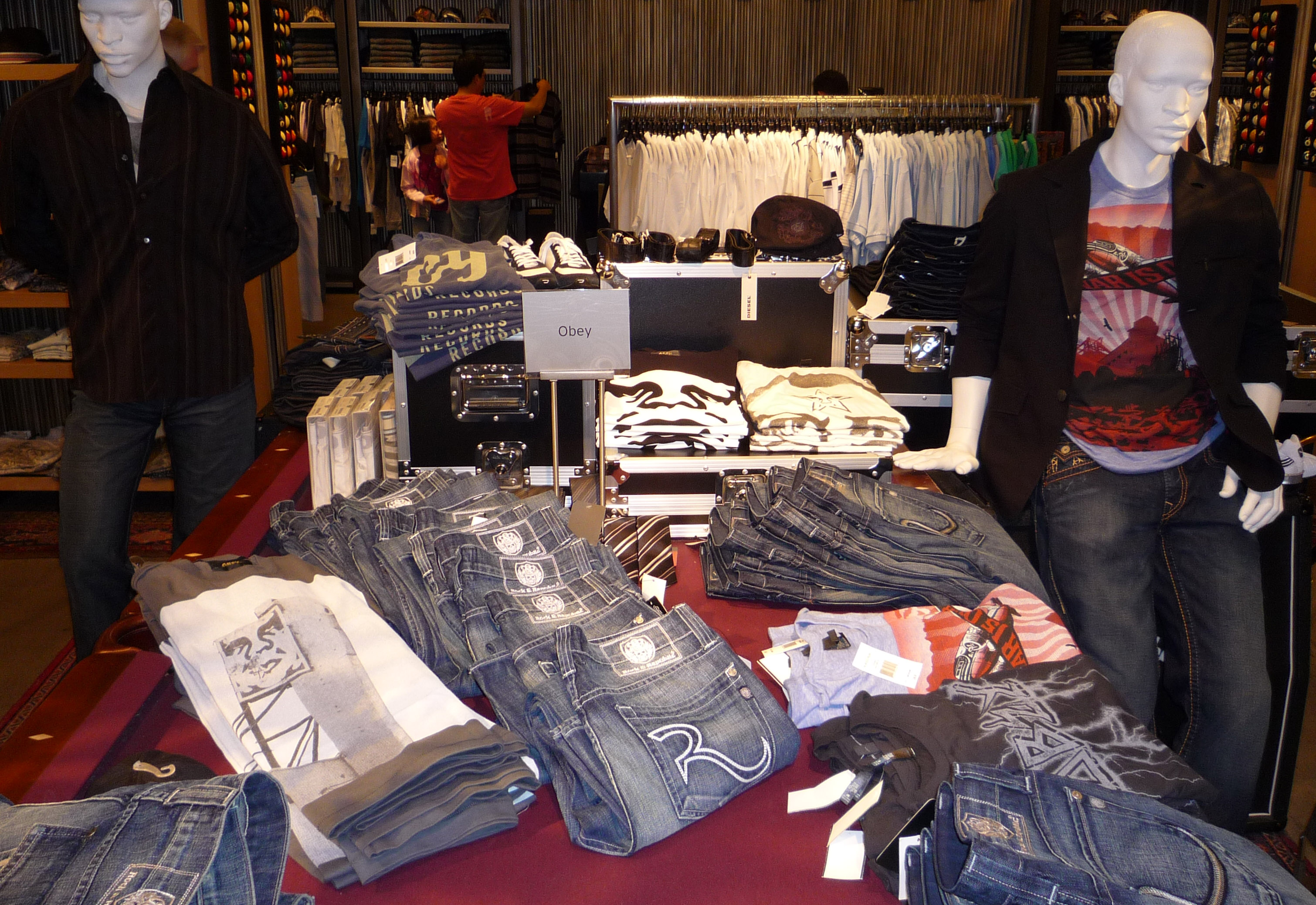
OBEY Giant clothing being sold at a department store in San Francisco, California. 2008

OBEY Giant poster on building exterior. Brooklyn, New York. 2004

In 1989 Fairey and fellow Rhode Island School of Design student Ryan Lesser, along with Blaize Blouin, Alfred Hawkins and Mike Mongo created paper and vinyl stickers and posters with an image of the wrestler André the Giant and the text "ANDRE THE GIANT HAS A POSSE 7′ 4″, 520 lb". This text is a reference to Andre the Giant's billed height and weight of "7′ 4″, 520 lbs" (2.24 m, 235.87 kg).

In an interview with Format magazine in 2008, Fairey commented that: "The Andre the Giant sticker was just a spontaneous, happy accident. I was teaching a friend how to make stencils in the summer of 1989, and I looked for a picture to use in the newspaper, and there just happened to be an ad for wrestling with André the Giant and I told him that he should make a stencil of it. He said 'Nah, I’m not making a stencil of that, that’s stupid!' but I thought it was funny so I made the stencil and I made a few stickers and the group of guys I was hanging out with always called each other The Posse, so it said Andre the Giant Has a Posse, and it was sort of appropriated from hip-hop slang – Public Enemy, N.W.A and Ice-T were all using the word."

What began as an in-joke directed at hip hop and skater subculture grew to Fairey putting up stickers and posters throughout Providence, Rhode Island, and then the rest of the United States.

In 1996 Fairey changed the face and text of the original sticker to a new image with the text "Obey" and Fairey has commented that "I finally got a notification from his [Andre the Giant's] estate that I couldn't use the phrase "Andre the Giant" in any images or use his face in anything. The thing is, and this is why I had to shut my website down and change the name from www.andrethegiant.com to www.obeygiant.com.... [is that] ...the WWF owns the name obey giant... ..But in the more recent images that I've done, the face has changed enough from the original likeness to not be copyright infringement. So what I'm gonna do is still make the original sticker, just not sell them or put that name on any clothing that I could get a lawsuit for. As far as the fine art domain, it's totally open. Warhol didn't get sued for using Marilyn Monroe's likeness, as long it was changed enough."

In relation to the process of creating the OBEY Giant image Fairey has commented that "Well, the original Andre sticker took like 10 minutes, but the icon face…[OBEY Giant] that took me a couple of nights of hanging out at Kinko's until the wee hours. Because first I illustrated it, the whole face, based on the two sides of the analog Andre face. And then I decided which half of the face was more appealing, simplified that, mirrored it, and then I cut it out. You know, I did this all without a computer... ...These are all things that I can do very efficiently on the computer now, but it was all done by hand." In 2007 Fairey further commented that "...I felt like the face had a lot of resonance already and that I should continue with the branding of the image and just transition it into something that had more of an Orwellian connotation, so that's when I simplified the face to what I call the 'icon face'."

By the mid to late 1990s there had been tens of thousands of paper and vinyl stickers that had been hand-silkscreened and photocopied, as well as posters and stencils, that had been put in visible places throughout the world. In 2007 Fairey commented that the "Andre the Giant has a posse sticker started out as a fluke... ...I completely lucked out with that. You know if someone were to say 'Come up with an icon that you're gonna perpetuate for the next 15 years', definitely wouldn't have been that, but the more I put it out there the more of a reaction it got...". The "Obey Giant" image was also put up on the streets in posters, stencils and stickers via a campaign from an international network of collaborators as well as by people who had no connection to Fairey but were interested in putting the image on the streets.

"Andre the Giant Has a Posse" is also the title of a 1995 documentary short by Helen Stickler, which was the first documentary to feature Shepard Fairey and chronicle his influential street art campaign. The film screened worldwide, most notably at the 1997 Sundance Film Festival. In 2003, Village Voice film critic Ed Halter described the film as: "legendary" and "a canonical study of a Gen-X media manipulation. One of the keenest examinations of '90s underground culture".

The "OBEY" slogan was not only a parody of propaganda, but also a direct homage to the "OBEY" signs found in the cult film, They Live (1988), starring Roddy Piper. About "OBEY", San Diego Union-Tribune art critic Robert L. Pincus said: "[Fairey's work] was a reaction against earlier political art, since it delivered no clear message. Still, 'Obey' was suggestively antiauthoritarian." Nick Mount, a contributor for The Walrus, commented that "Following the example set by gallery art, some street art is more about the concept than the art,". "'Fuck Bush' isn’t an aesthetic; it’s an ethic. Shepard Fairey’s Obey Giant stickers and Akay's Akayism posters are clever children of Duchamp, ironic conceptual art." OBEY Giant began with a sticker and later expanded to include prints, murals, clothing, and other media.

In the documentary Exit Through the Gift Shop, directed by Banksy, Fairey can be seen on the streets of Los Angeles in around 2002 putting up sticker art that is very similar in design to the very first Andre the Giant has a Posse stickers that were created. He is also seen putting up the new OBEY giant image on paste ups including one paste up that is roughly 4 metres by 4 metres in size. At around the same time in 2002 he is also filmed inside a Kinko's on Vine Street in LA creating large paste up images of Andre the Giant, alongside Amanda Fairey who is also Shephard's wife. Fairey is also seen on a second occasion inside a building where he is working on a variation of the OBEY giant image where the image is placed inside a star.

In 2017 a documentary based on the life of Shepard Fairey was titled Obey Giant.

== Parodies ==
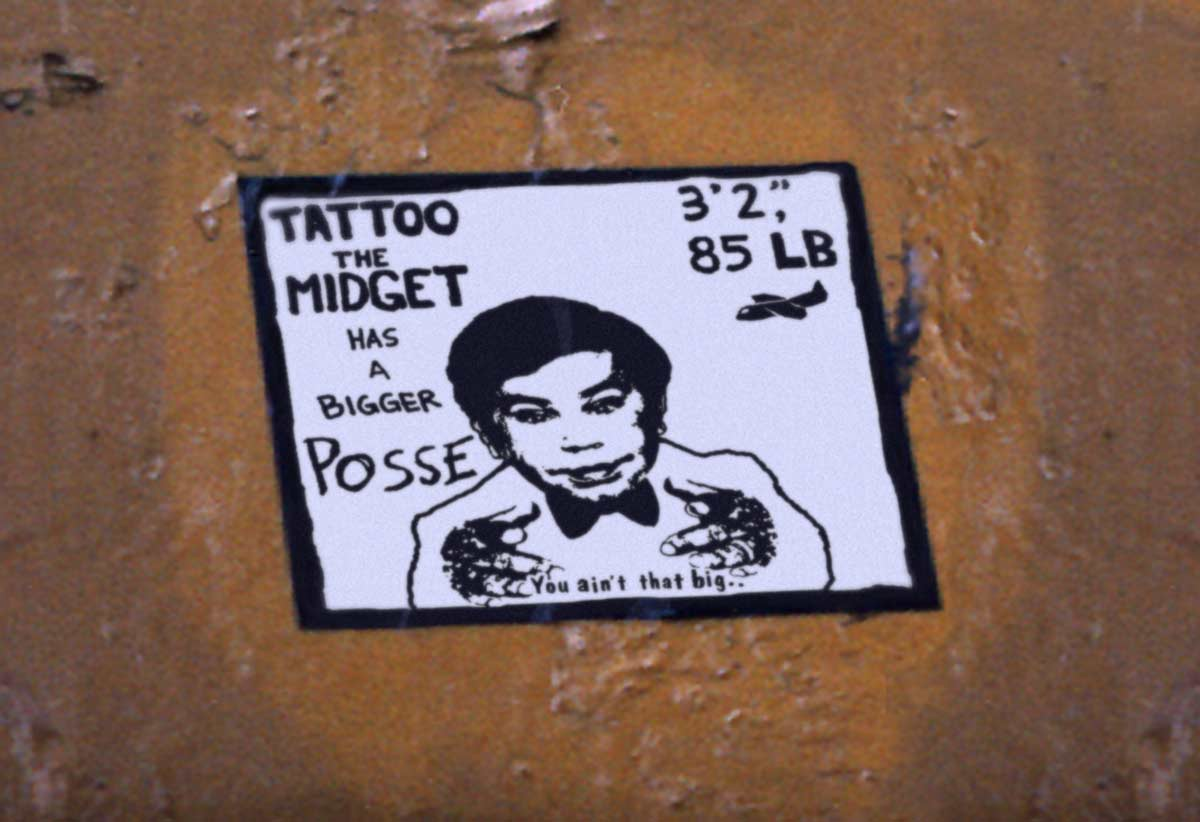
TATTOO the MIDGET has a bigger posse. Photo taken in New York. 2000

The original "Andre the Giant Has a Posse" sticker format has been widely imitated for humorous effect over many years. In these parody stickers, the image of André the Giant has been replaced with a similarly stylized black-and-white photo of some other person or character, along with the new figure's height and weight.

For example, the parody sticker "Tattoo the Midget Has a Bigger Posse" features the image of Hervé Villechaize portraying the character Tattoo from Fantasy Island. Colin Purrington's "Charles Darwin Has a Posse" stickers, featuring a black-and-white photo of Charles Darwin, promote the theory of evolution. During the 2000 presidential campaign in the United States, "Ralph Nader Has a Posse" showed up on college campuses. Numerous other parody stickers can be found featuring different popular culture figures, including the Homestar Runner character Strong Mad.

These parody stickers are a further extension of the original "joke", and thus are most likely to be found in locations where the original André the Giant iconography is already familiar, such as SoHo, Manhattan, or South Street, Philadelphia. An unusual occurrence of a parody sticker was at the particle physics laboratory Fermilab where the director of the lab, Pier Oddone, was the subject of the sticker.

Tenacious D produced stickers with the slogan "Obey the D" and stylized images of their members, Jack Black and Kyle Gass, over their initials. Guitar Hero II features a "Vlad Has a Posse" sticker on various loading screens throughout the game. Electronic Frontier Foundation created a sticker with the words "Fair Use Has a Posse" on it. "Joey Deacon Has a Posse" parody stencils have appeared in the United Kingdom.

"Jack Has a Posse" stickers have appeared in the Gaslamp Quarter of San Diego, California, in July 2011 during the Esri International User Conference held at the nearby San Diego Convention Center. The stickers carry an image of US businessman Jack Dangermond, founder of Esri.

ThinkGeek produced a T-shirt with the slogan "Fezzik Has a Posse" in March 2012, in reference to André the Giant's role as Fezzik in the movie The Princess Bride (1987) and the "Andre the Giant Has a Posse" street art campaign.

The cover of the April 2017 issue of Harper's Magazine features a photo of a protester with a sign parodying the "Obey" poster with a stylized portrait of President Donald Trump and the slogan "Disobey".

== Gallery ==
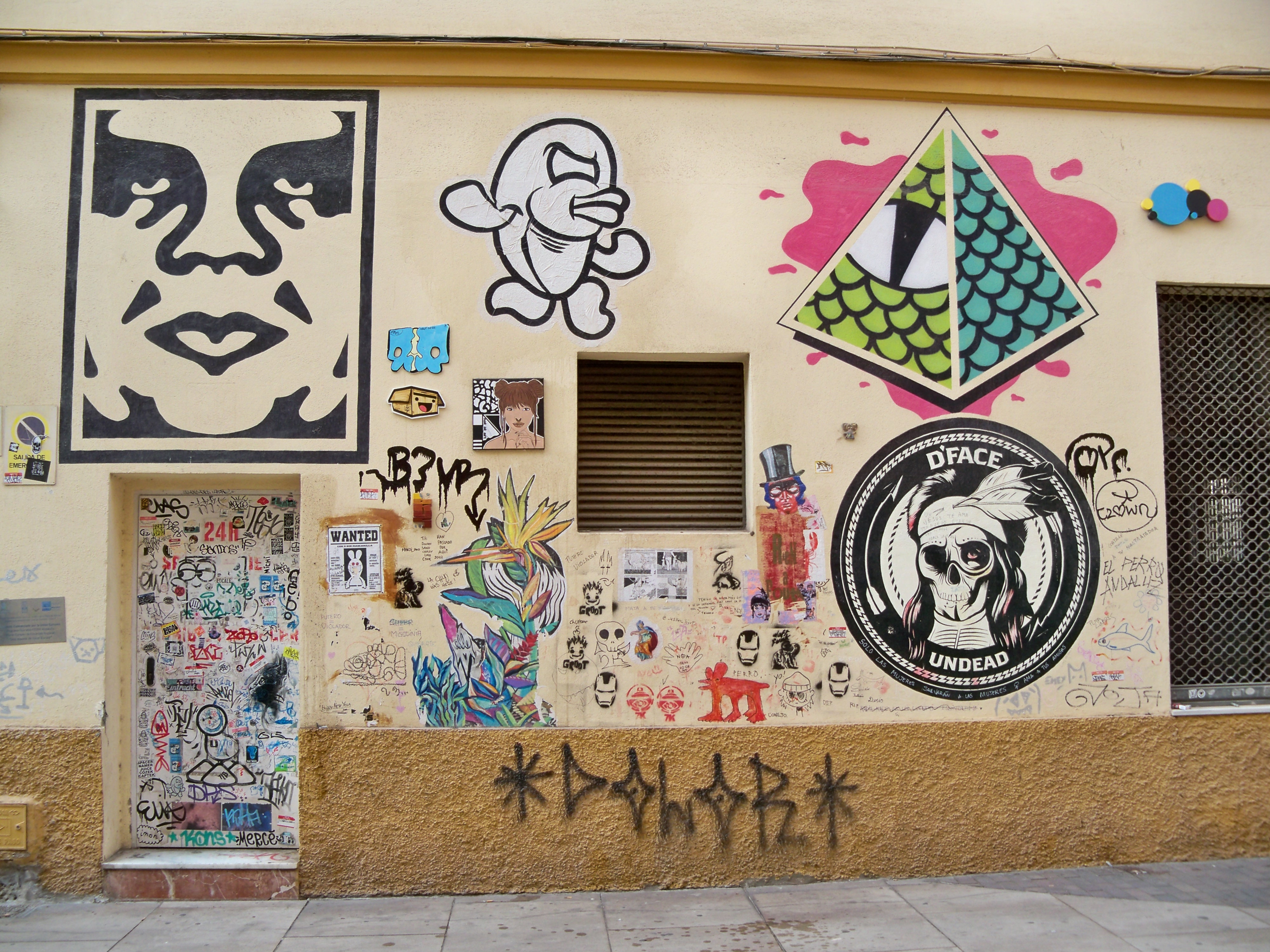
OBEY giant stencil on Casas de Campos, in Málaga, Spain.

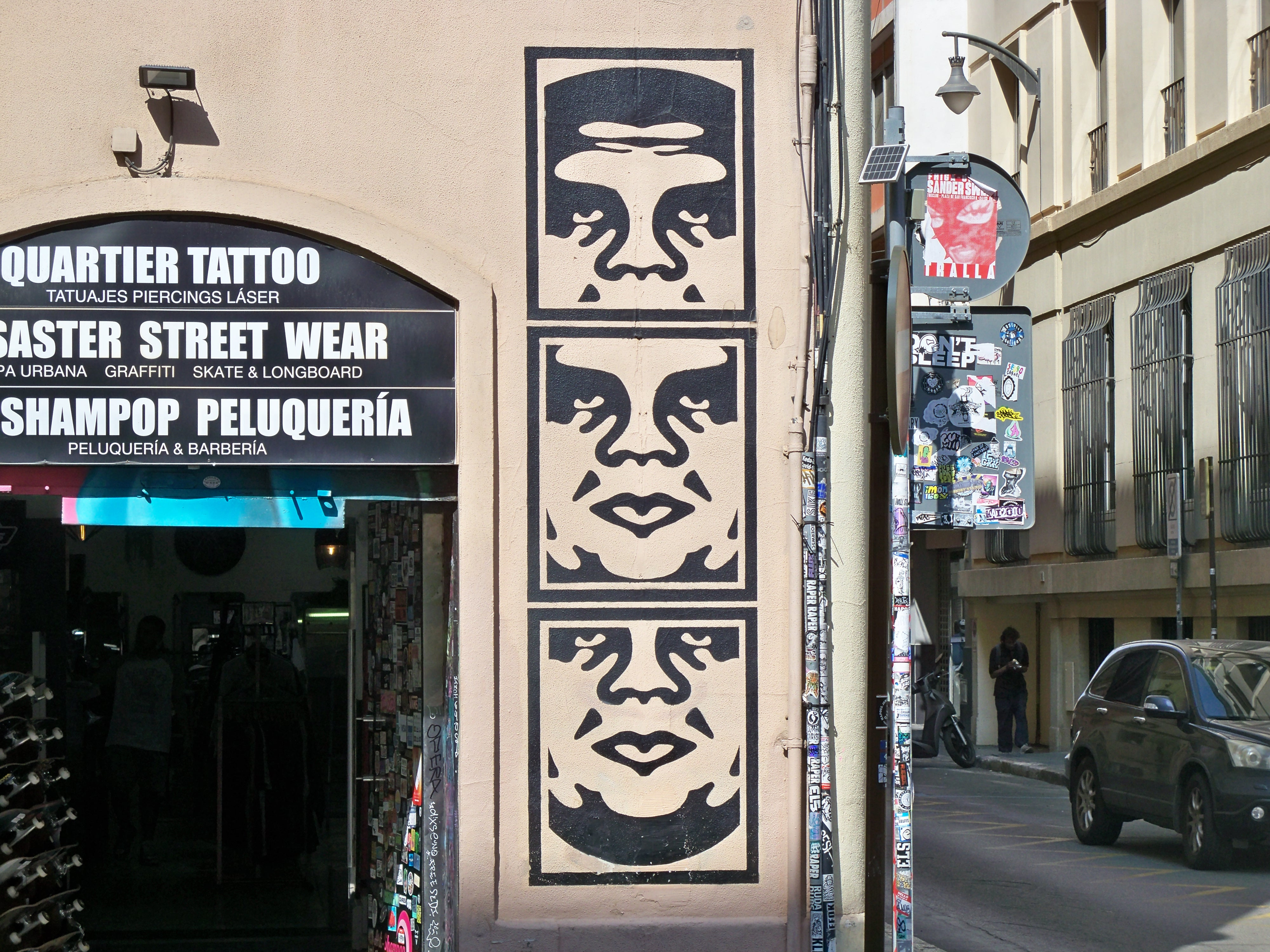
OBEY giant stencil in Málaga, Spain.

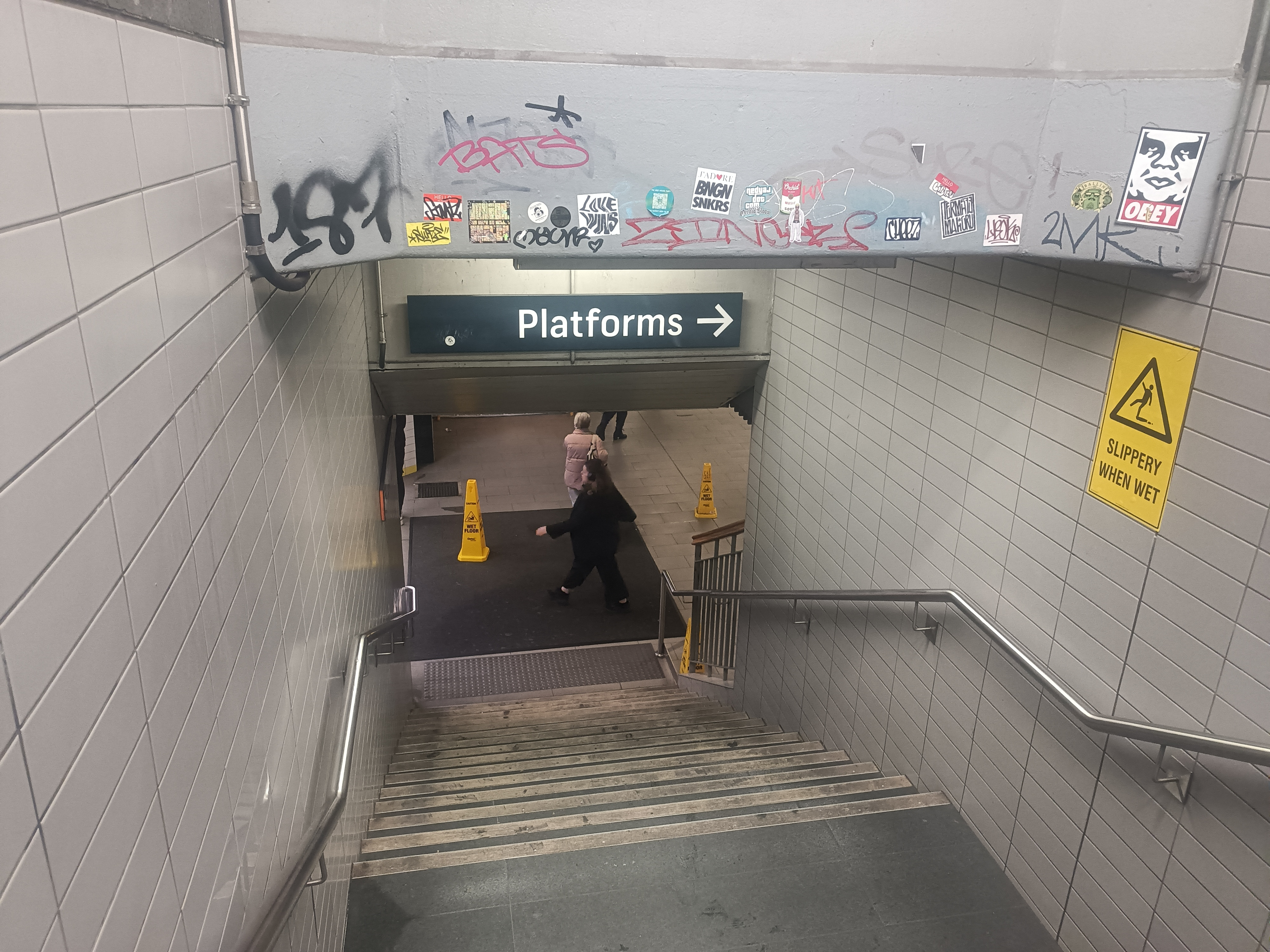
OBEY giant Sticker at an entrance to Town Hall Station, Sydney 2025.

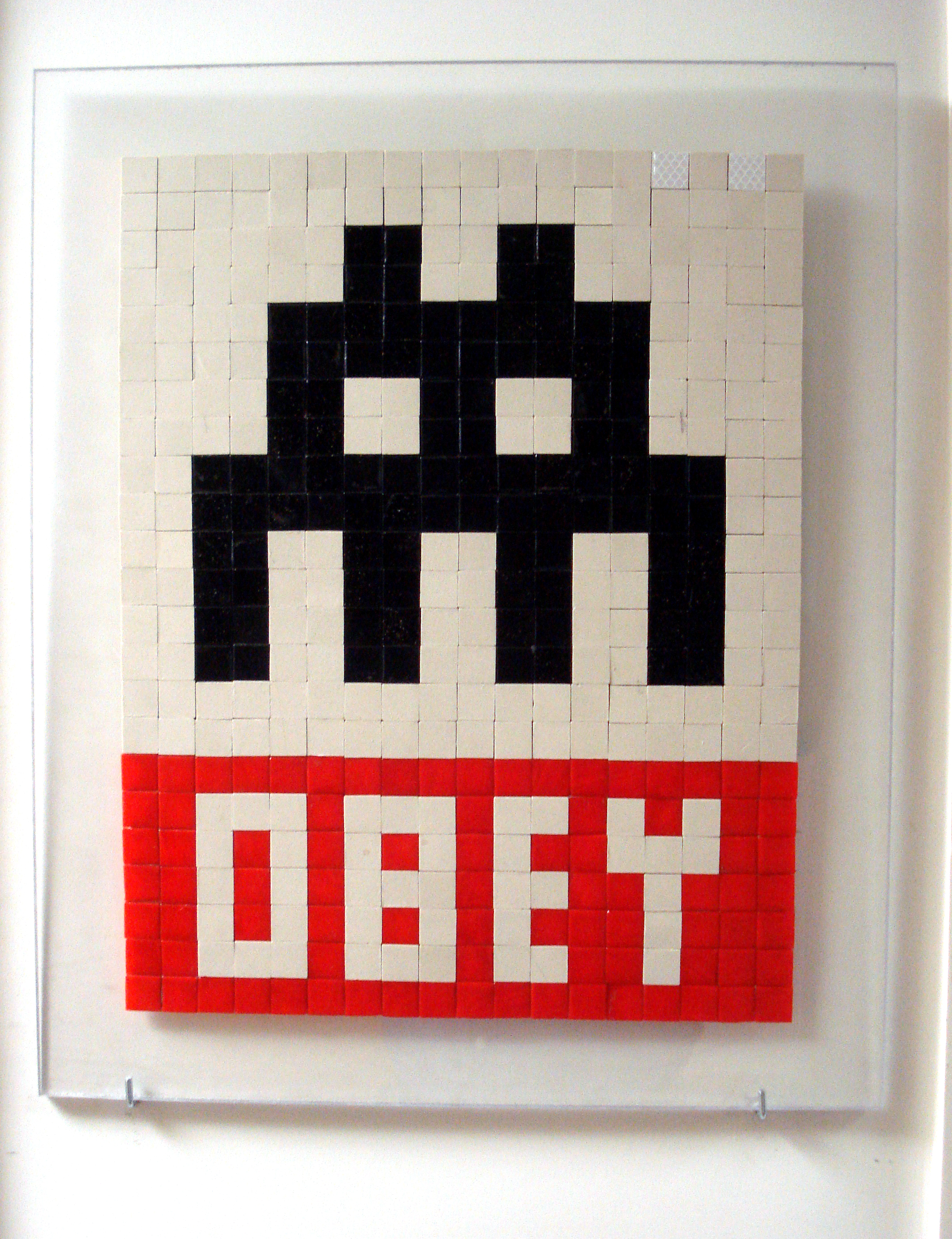
A Space Invader and Obey mash up, made by the street artist Invader and now hanging in Fairey's studio. This tile mosaic dates to between 1999 to 2002 when Invader and Fairey would create street art together.

== See also ==
- Guerrillero Heroico
- Culture jamming
- Graffiti
- Pop art
- Schwa (art)
- Sticker art
- Obey (clothing brand)
