= Sticker art =

Type of street art

A sticker by Smear photographed in Los Angeles in 2006

Sticker art (also known as slaps in a graffiti context) is a form of street art in which an image or message is publicly displayed using stickers. These stickers may promote a political agenda, comment on a policy or issue, or comprise a subcategory of graffiti.

Sticker artists use various types of stickers, from eggshell stickers to free paper stickers, such as the United States Postal Service's Label 228 or name tags. Part of their popularity in street art comes from being a faster, and therefore safer, option in illegal graffiti.

== History ==
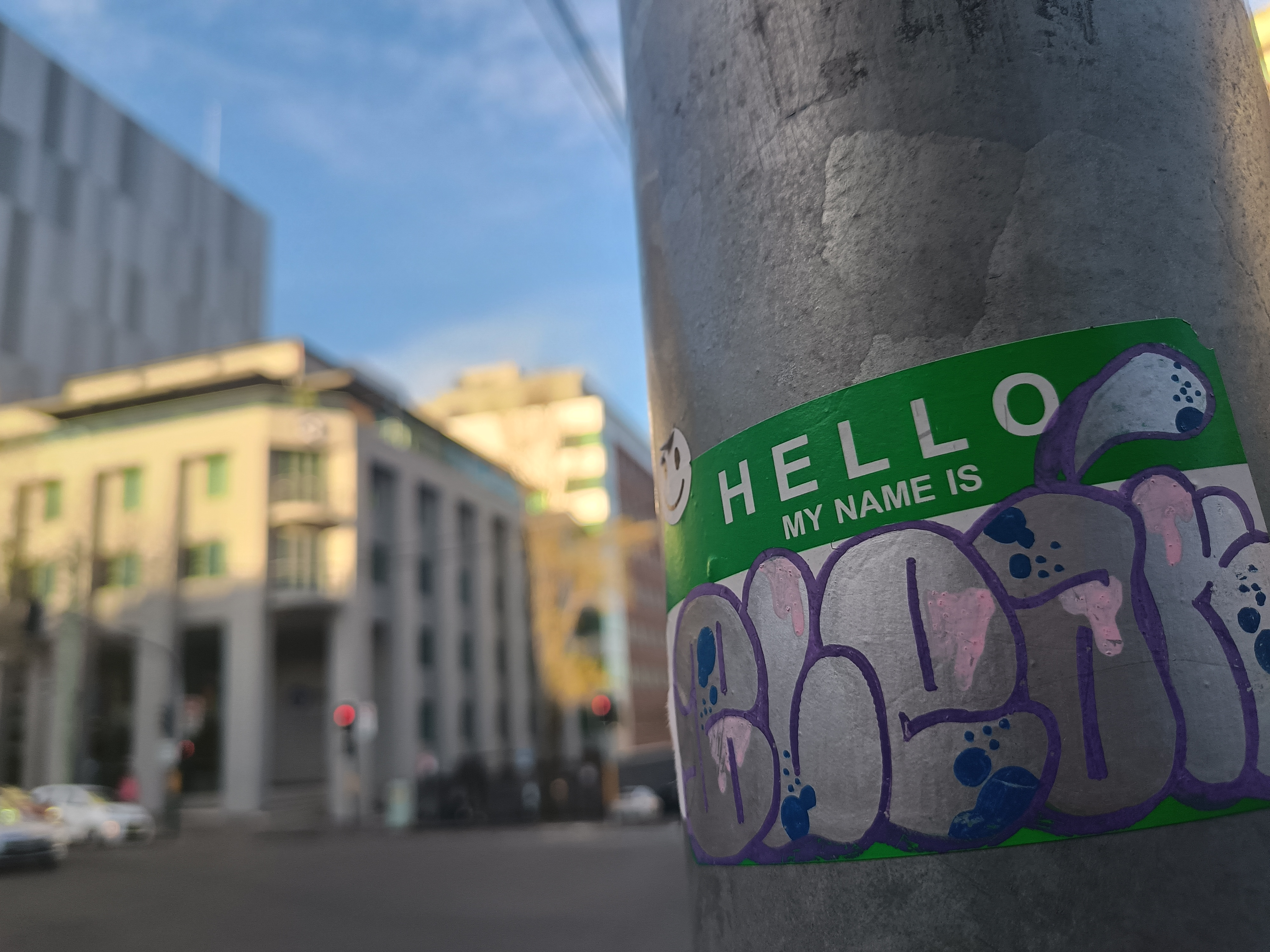

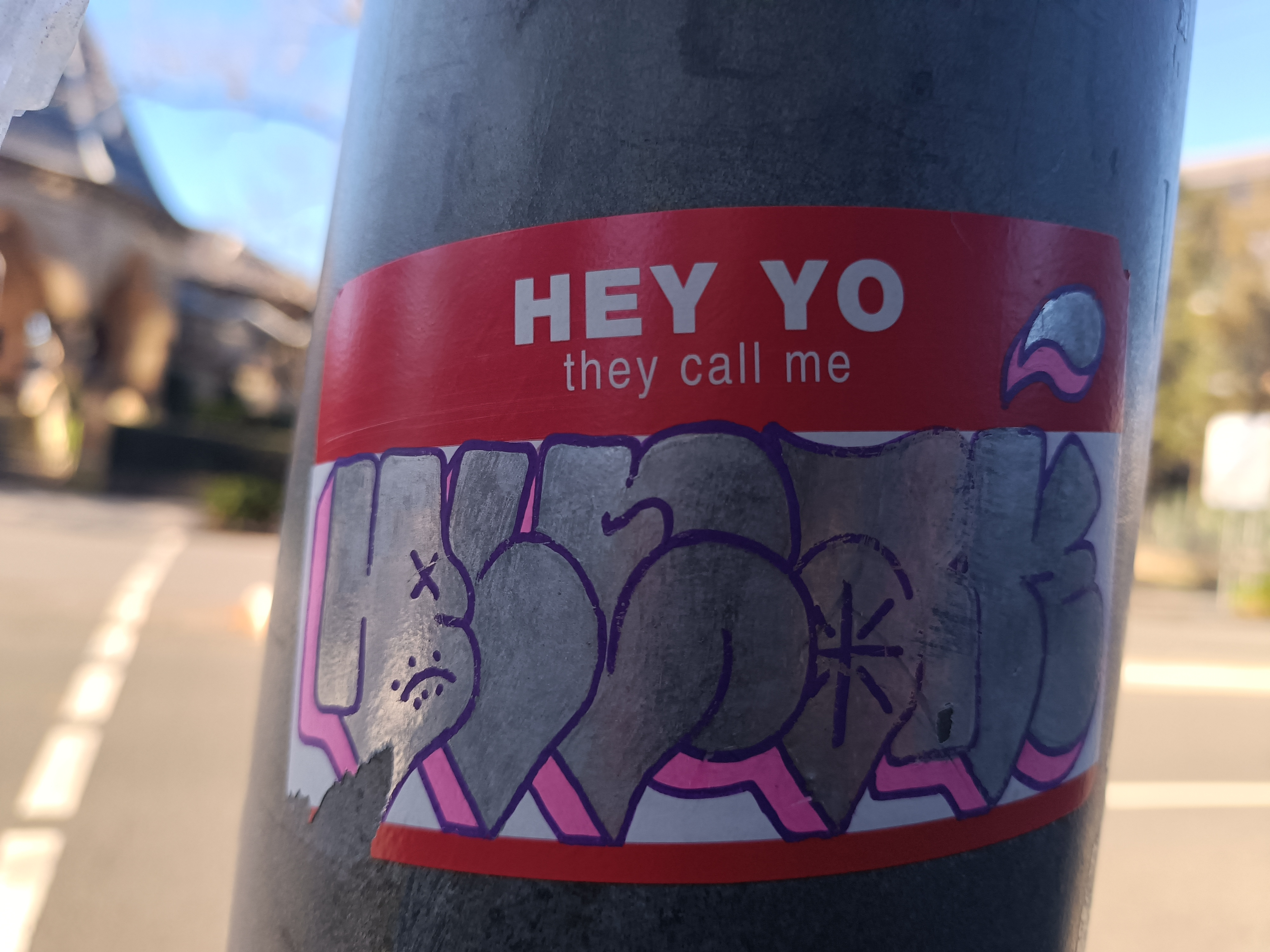
Two variations on name tag stickers. Sydney, 2024

United States Postal service label 228's are often used in the creation of sticker art. Sydney 2026

Name tag stickers that were printed with the text "Hello my name is" were first introduced by C-Line Products in 1959 and became widely used in both graffiti and sticker art. The United States Postal Service's Label 228 sticker also became widely used in sticker art.

In 1989 Shepard Fairey created the sticker Andre the giant has a posse and it has been recognised as an early example of printed sticker art in the United States. In 1996 Fairey altered the image of André the Giant and changed the text to read OBEY and Fairey has commented that "I felt like the face had a lot of resonance already and that I should continue with the branding of the image and just transition it into something that had more of an Orwellian connotation...". and since then this new image has been used in sticker art and become popular around the world for its ability to parody Orwellian propaganda.

The first European sticker art project is that by Piermario Ciani, initially started in the 1980s within the Trax project and more intensely starting from 1991, as also documented by a catalogue published in that year. Solo One was one of the first graffiti artists to use stickers with tags on them in 1999. Since 2000, many graffiti artists and street artists, like Katsu or Barry McGee incorporated stickers in their production, using them as an alternative to tagging and bombing, or as autonomous art projects.

== Creation ==
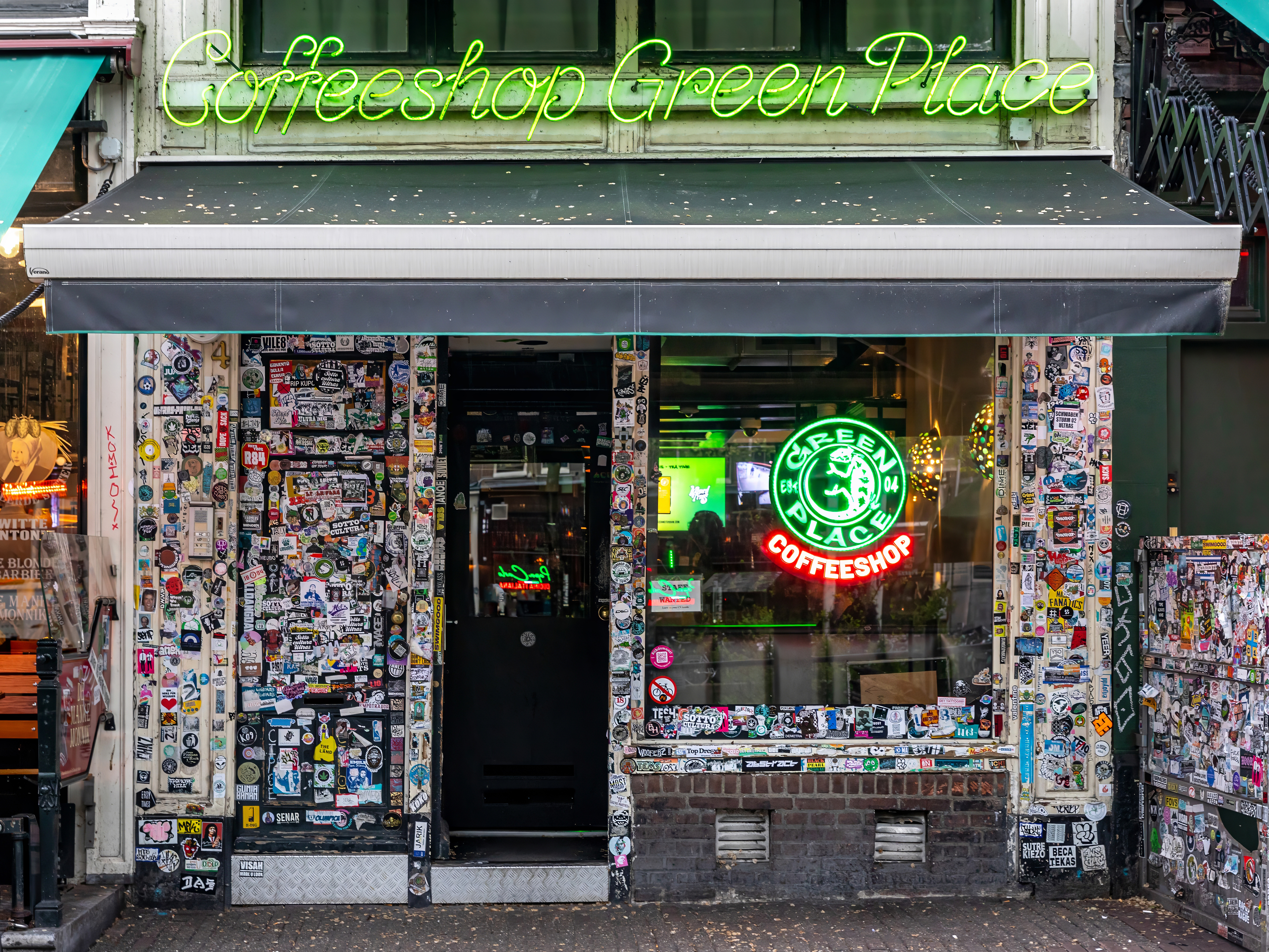
The exterior façade of the coffeeshop "Green Place" entirely covered with stickers in Amsterdam. 2024

Sticker artists may hand-draw stickers, print them using a commercial printing service or at home with a computer printer and self-adhesive labels, or have them made commercially.

Any kind of blank sticker can be used for sticker art. Both name tags and Label 228s are often used with hand-drawn art, and are quite hard to remove, leaving a white, sticky residue. Eggshell stickers are also a popular type of sticker created specifically for street art. They are named because an attempt to remove them results in tiny pieces breaking off, like an eggshell. Eggshell stickers are made of a mixture of paper and plastic which protects them from the elements. Eggshell stickers longevity allows sticker art to be a part of many urban landscapes.

== Exchange ==
Unlike other forms of graffiti which are created on public surfaces, stickers are portable before being "used" and many graffiti artists ("writers") trade stickers, and more popular artists sell their stickers. Graffiti shops often have places for writers to exchange stickers, and global stores allow for worldwide sticker exchanges which lets artist have their work put up in places they may never visit themselves.

Sticker art is sometimes a collectable item with some collections having over 10,000 stickers. Within graffiti culture, it is considered good manners for collectors to put up at least some of the stickers received in an exchange.

Sticker art exchanges also allow large numbers of artists to collaborate on a single sticker, or multiple stuck together.

== Artists ==
Popular artists that use this medium of street art include Shepard Fairey, D*Face, and Ron English.

Artist Cristina Vanko refers to her "I am Coal" project as "smart vandalism." Vanko uses stickers to identify objects that are coal-powered, spreading awareness of global climate change.

The artist Cindy Hinant created a series of projects from 2006 to 2009 that combined the tradition of sticker collecting and sticker bombing in works that reflected on feminine representations in popular culture.

== Gallery ==
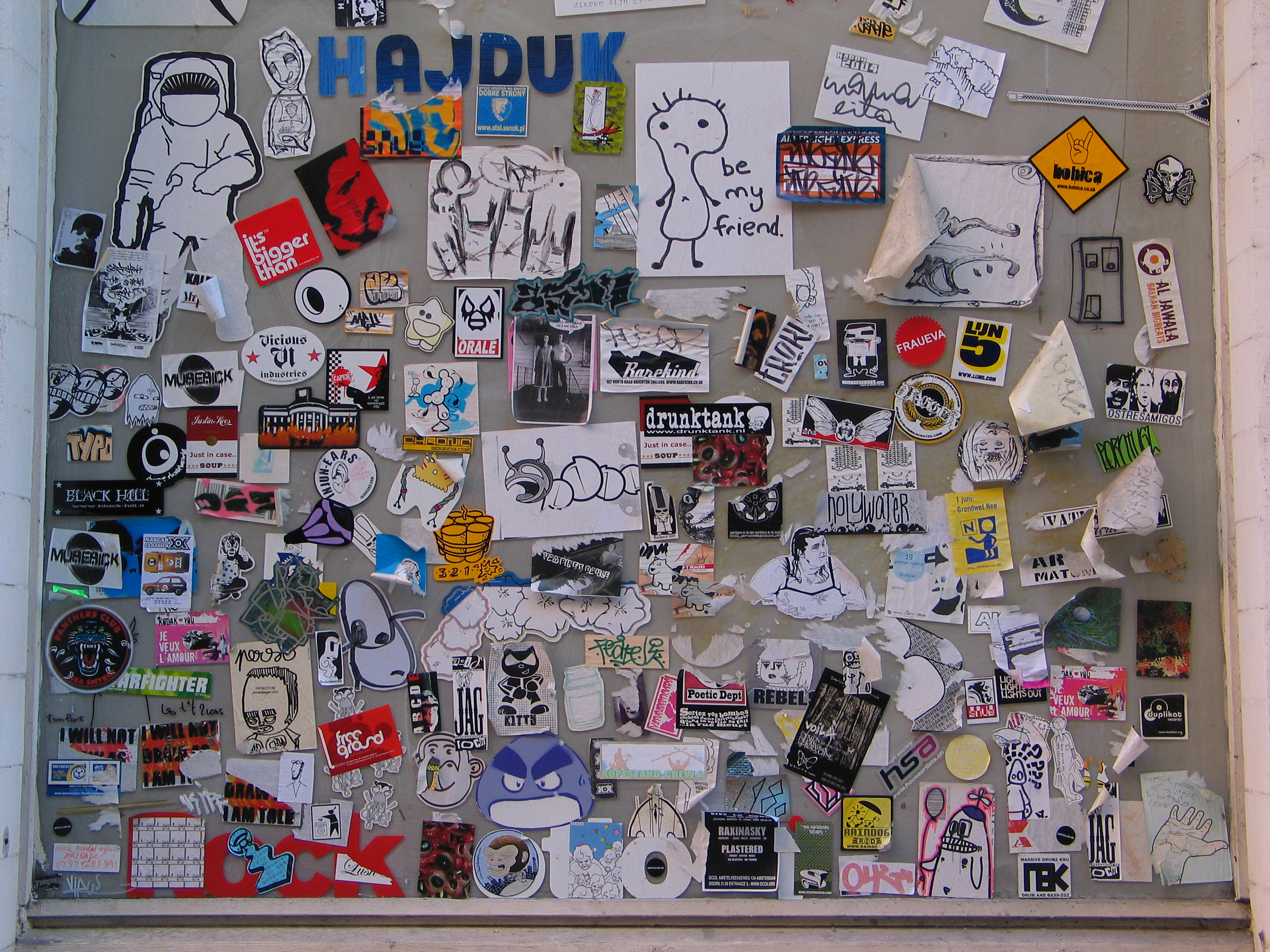
Sticker art in Amsterdam. (2005)

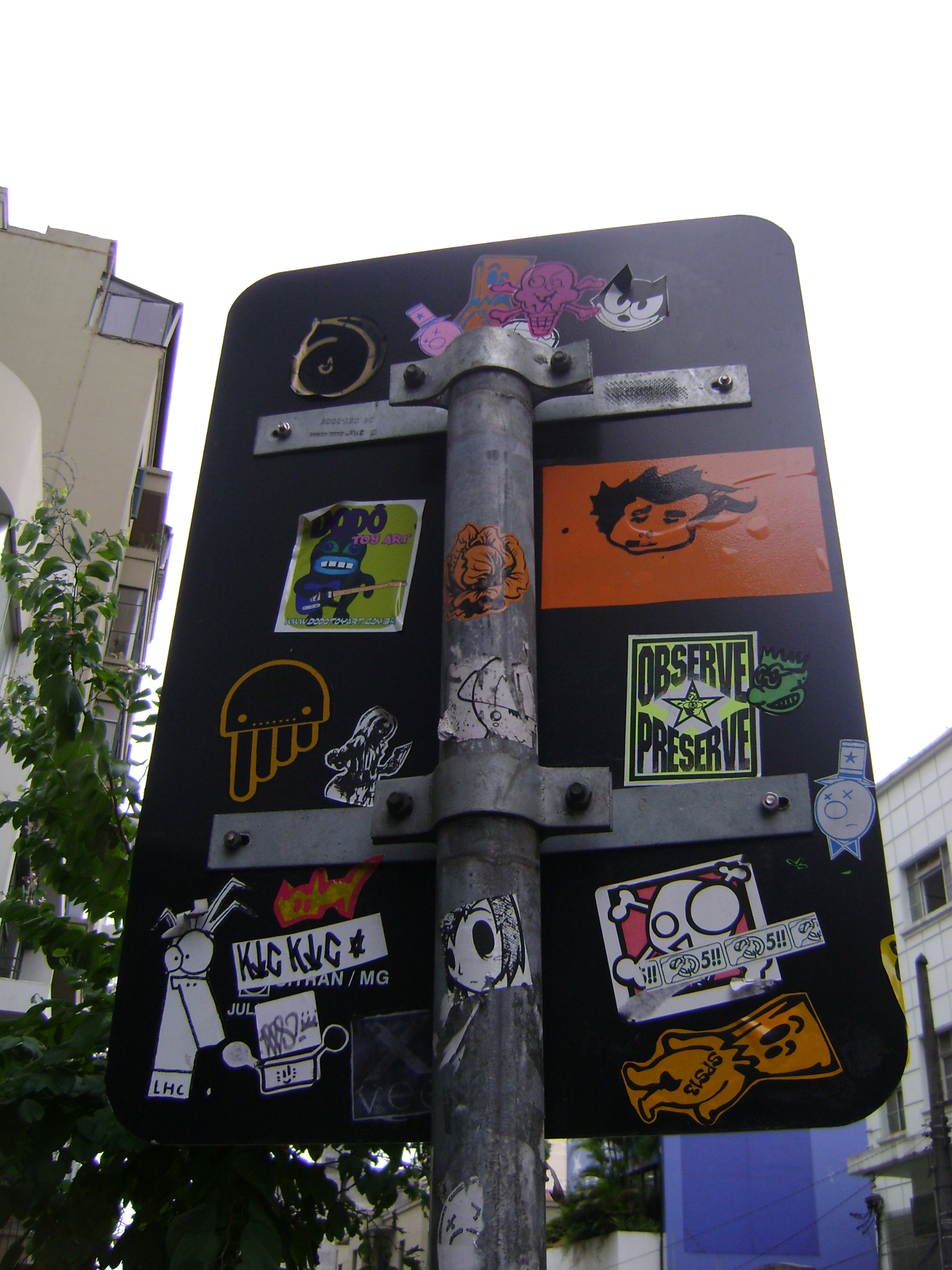
Sticker art in São Paulo, Brazil. (2009)

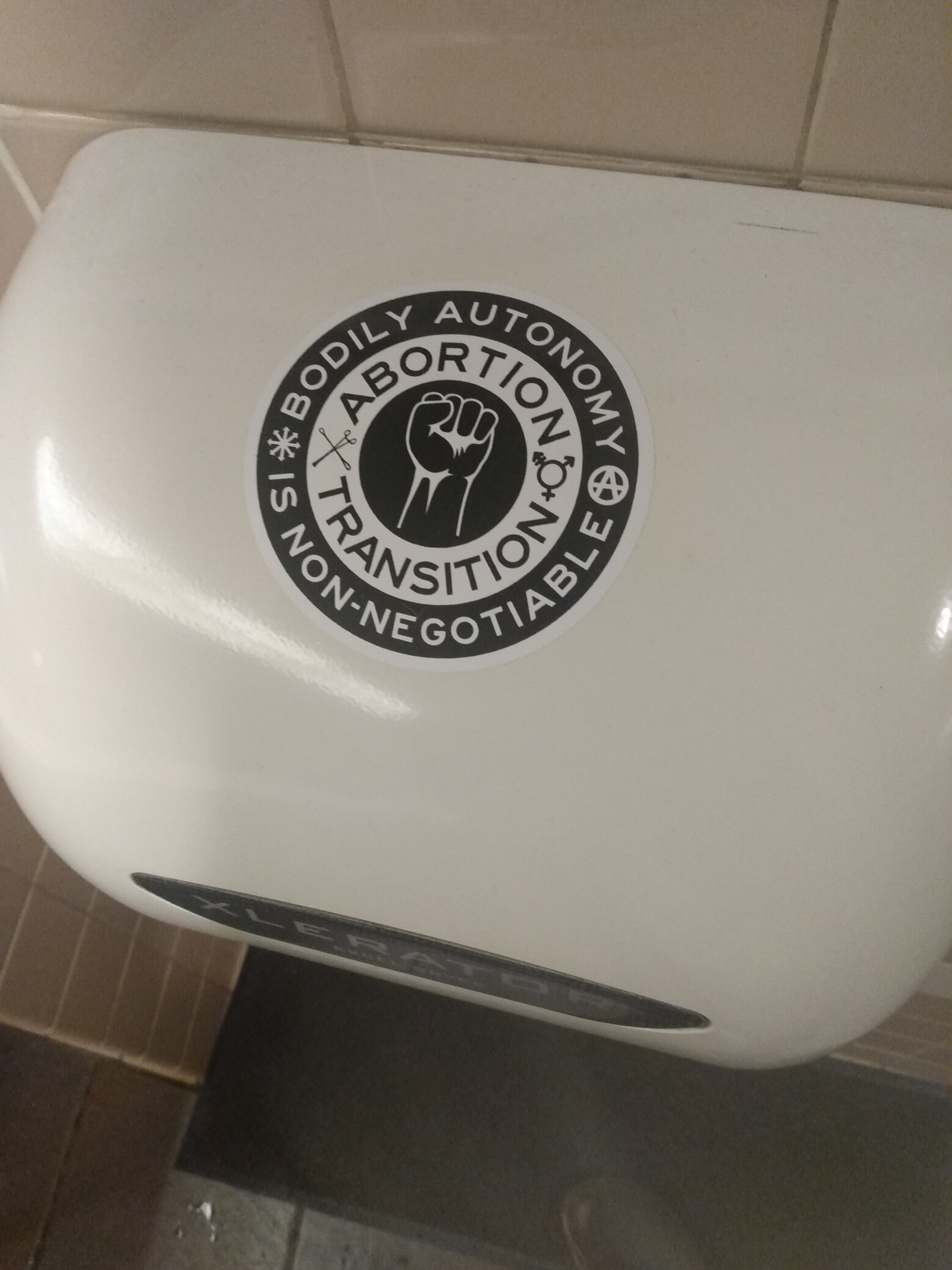
Sticker art expressing support of the pro-choice and transgender rights movements on a hand dryer in a public restroom in Portland, Oregon. (2023)

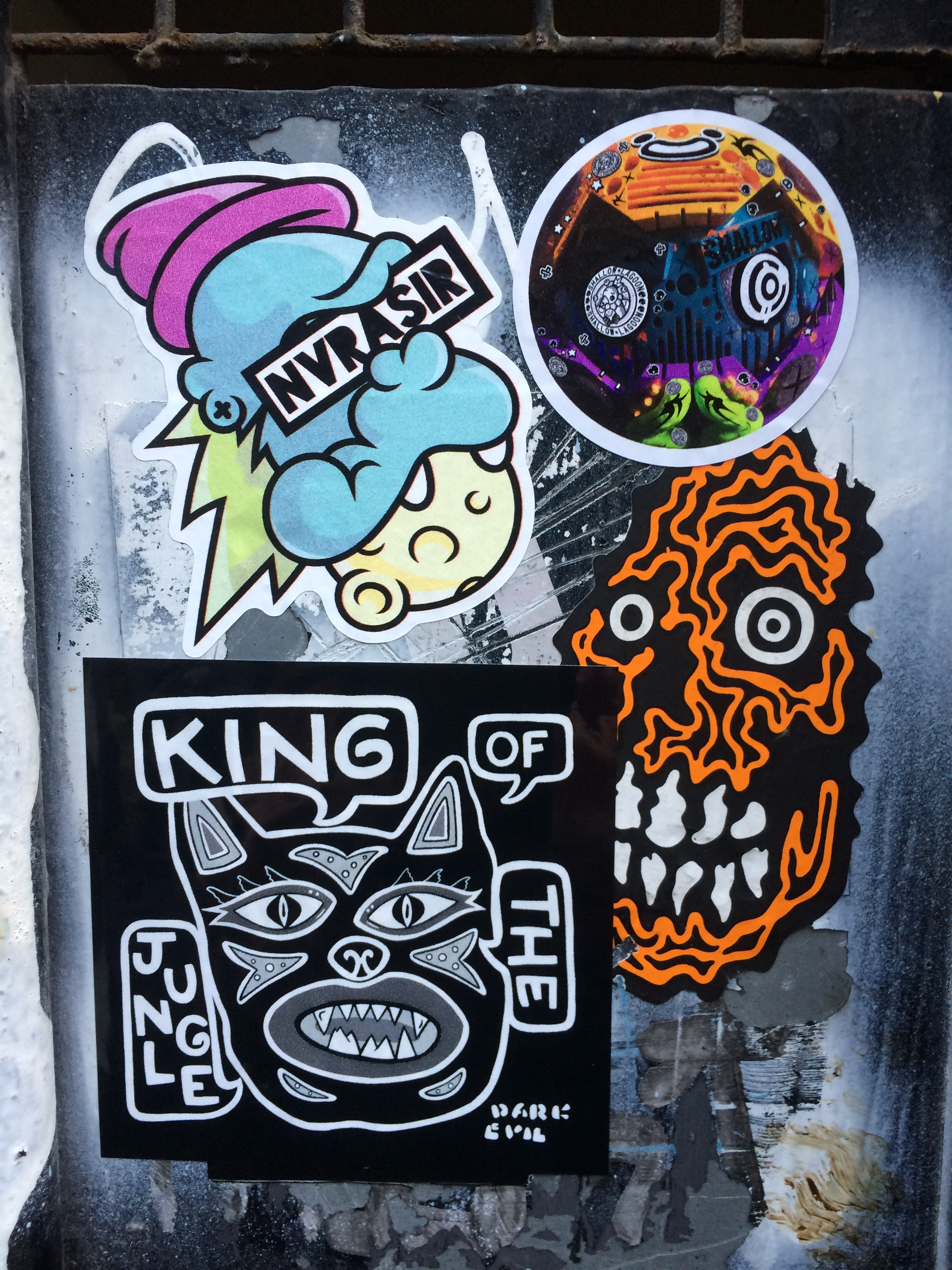
Stickers on a sign in Brick Lane, London by Rx Skulls, Dark Evil, ShallowLagoon and Nvrasir. (2025)

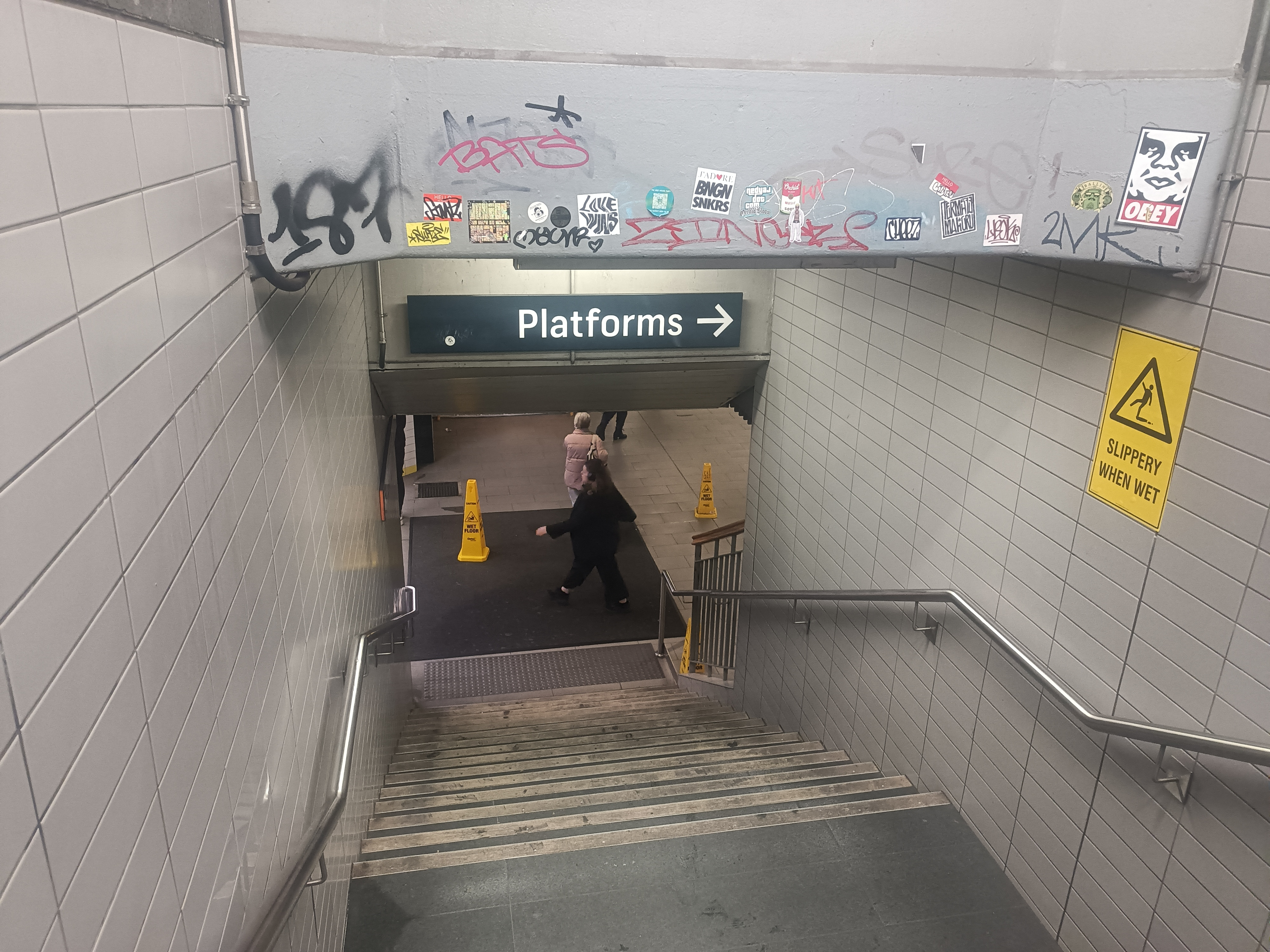
Sticker art at an entrance to the Town Hall subway station in Sydney. At the far right is an OBEY Giant sticker created by Shepard Fairey in 1996, based on the original Andre the giant has a posse sticker first created by Fairey in 1989. This image has become famous across the world for its ability to parody "Orwellian" propaganda. (2025)

== See also ==
- Culture jamming
- Flyposting
- Graffiti
- Guerilla art
- I Did That!
- Papier-mâché
- Stencil street art
- Street art
- Street installation
- Street poster art
- Street art sculptures
- Wheatpaste
