= Miss Me Yet? =

Series of billboards

Miss Me Yet? refers to a series of roadside advertisements that first appeared in February 2010. It featured former U.S. President George W. Bush's image waving and smiling from a billboard over the words "MISS ME YET?", presumably as a critique of the presidential successor Barack Obama's performance in office.

== History ==
The billboard was initially spotted in February 2010, on Interstate 35 in Wyoming, Minnesota. Similar billboards popped up around the country. It was first thought to be an Internet hoax, but has since been verified as a real billboard ad. The billboard, which rapidly became an Internet meme, has also inspired a series of "Miss Me Yet?"-themed merchandise from online agencies such as CafePress.

== Ownership ==
The billboard was mentioned on Rush Limbaugh's talk radio show as some callers mentioned the billboard did exist. The billboard was later discovered to have been created by an anonymous source who wanted to remain that way as per billboard owner Schubert & Hoey Outdoor Advertising. According to the billboard owner, the sign was purchased by a group of small business owners located in the seven-county metro area. Mike Rivard, one of the six business owners from Minnesota, came forward and explained on Fox News that one of the reasons why they did it was that it was a hilarious message, and the image they used was found online.
