= Nafudakake =

Display of name tags in Japanese culture, especially at a dojo

Nafudakake (名札掛け; lit. "name-plate-rack") is a Japanese method of displaying all the names of the members in a group by collecting the names on individual plaques called nafuda (名札; "nametag") and hanging them together in a specialized case called kake (掛け; "rack"). Nafudakake can be found in traditional art forms such as chadō, in modern art forms such as judo, at Shinto shrines (where they are used to display the names of benefactors) and in some modern organizations such as volunteer fire departments. In English, the term is most commonly associated with Japanese martial arts, and nafudakake are commonly considered an element of a traditional martial arts dojo.

== Nafuda ==
Nafuda are thin, rectangular wooden plaques on which individuals’ names are written vertically in kanji or kana or horizontally in Latin script. The plaques are usually made from a light wood such as pine and hand-painted. The back of the plaque may contain information about the person's history in the dojo.

The term "nafuda" should not be confused with the identification worn on the tare of kendo armor, for which the same word can be used.

== Purpose and use of nafuda ==
Nafuda are used for different purposes in different dojos. In some dojos, nafuda are arranged according to rank, and a person's nafuda is moved upon attaining a higher rank, although other dojos display only the nafuda of yudansha but not those of mudansha. In some dojos, nafuda are used to track attendance and in others a member's nafuda is removed for failure to pay dojo fees on time. In some dojos, only the nafuda of currently active members are displayed, while in others the nafuda of past members who have moved away or died are displayed as a kind of memorial. Some dojos display the nafuda of foreign affiliates of the dojo, but do so separately from active members of the dojo. Some dojos display the adult and child nafuda separately. In yet other dojos, everyone who has received a dan grade from the dojo is listed as yudansha on the nafudakake. The nafudakake can be used to display the names of the dojo's lineage and style's founders. In the Seattle Dojo, which is the oldest judo dojo in the United States, displayed nafuda from early members help maintain the historical memory of the dojo.

== Design and placement of nafudakake ==
There is no standardized design for nafudakake. The nafuda may be hung from small hooks on the kake or held in place by wooden trusses. The nafudakake may be placed in the shimoza (cosmological "south"—often the actual south wall) of a dojo, although it may also be located in other places such as the shimoseki (cosmological "west"), which in Daoist thought is representative of rectitude, or the proper relationship between members of the dojo. The joseki (cosmological "east") may also be used, and if the arts of more than one ryū (流) are taught in the same dojo, separate nafudakake for both schools may be displayed.

The arrangement of the nafuda on the kake may be very different from one dojo to another. Although Chinese characters are traditionally read vertically and in columns from right to left, some dojos place their senior member in the upper left portion of their nafudakake.

The following example of a nafudakake is hanging on the west wall (shimoseki) of a Japanese aikido dojo. The dojo displays one nafudakake for instructors and a separate one for yudansha. In this example, the nafuda should be read right-to-left as follows:

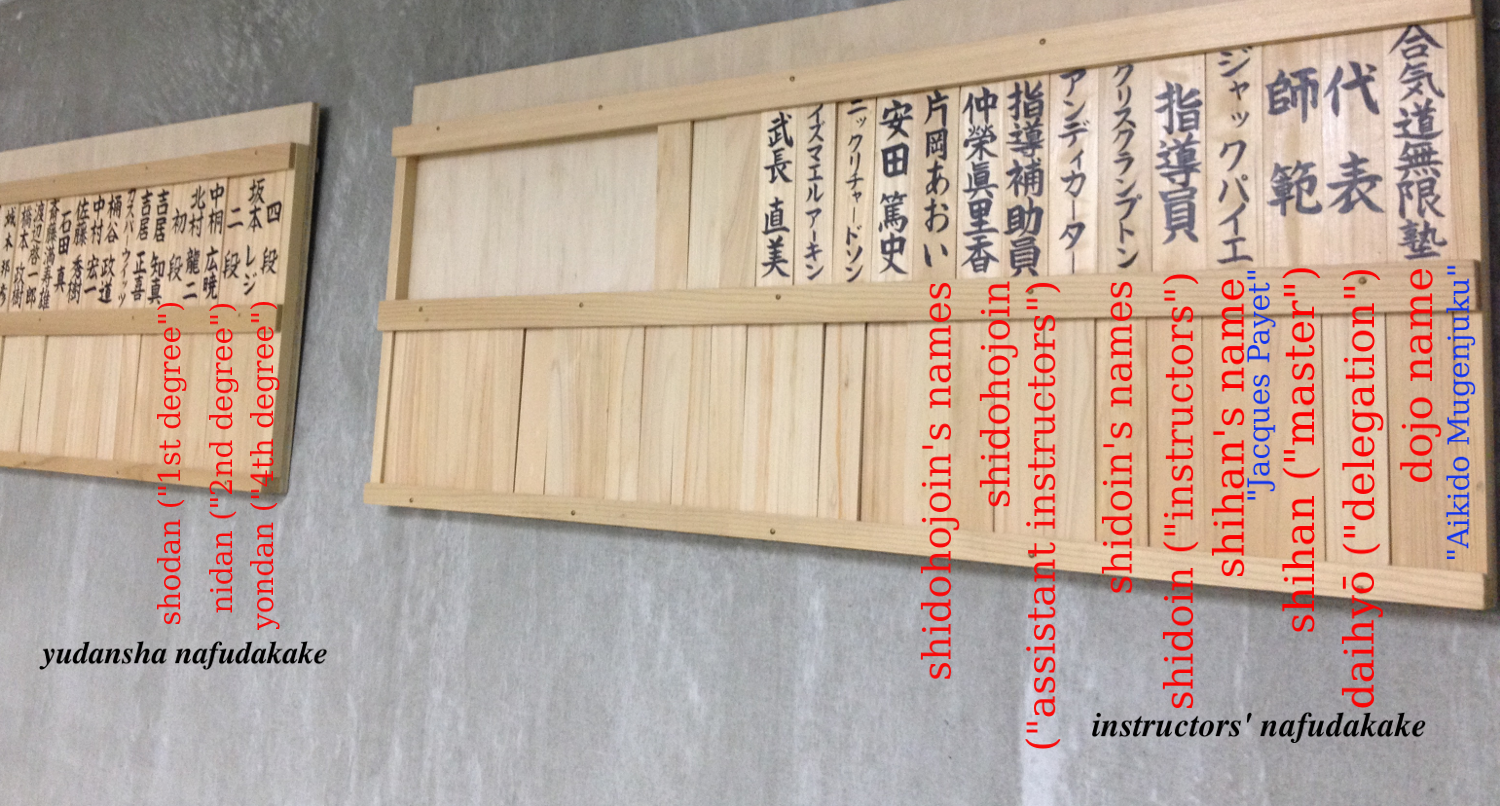
nafudakake at a Japanese aikido dojo (unlabeled version in Wikimedia Commons)

instructors’ nafudakake
nafuda (read L-R)	transliteration "translation"	purpose
合気道無限塾	Aikido Mugenjuku	name of the dojo
代表	daihyo "delegation"	categorizes all the nafuda that follow as representatives of the dojo
師範	shihan "master"	categorizes the nafuda that follows as chief instructor of the dojo
ジャックパイエ	"Jacques Payet"	name of chief instructor
指導員	shidoin "instructors"	categorizes the nafuda that follow as instructors at the dojo
	name	name of instructor
	name	name of instructor
指導補助員	shidohojoin "assistants"	categorizes the nafuda that follow as assistant instructors
	names	6 names of assistants

yudansha nafudakake
nafuda kanji (read L-R)	transliteration "translation"	purpose
四段	yondan "4th degree"	categorizes the nafuda that follows as ranked 4th-dan in the dojo
	name	name of 4th-dan holder
二段	nidan "2nd degree"	categorizes the nafuda that follow as ranked 2nd-dan in the dojo
	name	name of 2nd-dan holder
	name	name of 2nd-dan holder
初段	shodan "1st degree"	categorizes the nafuda that follow as ranked 1st-dan in the dojo
	names	11 names of 1st-dan holders

In addition to the terminology presented in this example, nafudakake may designate sensei (teacher), senpai (senior student), or any of a number of other positions recognized in martial arts dojos.
