= Name tag =

Item worn on someone's clothes telling the wearer's name

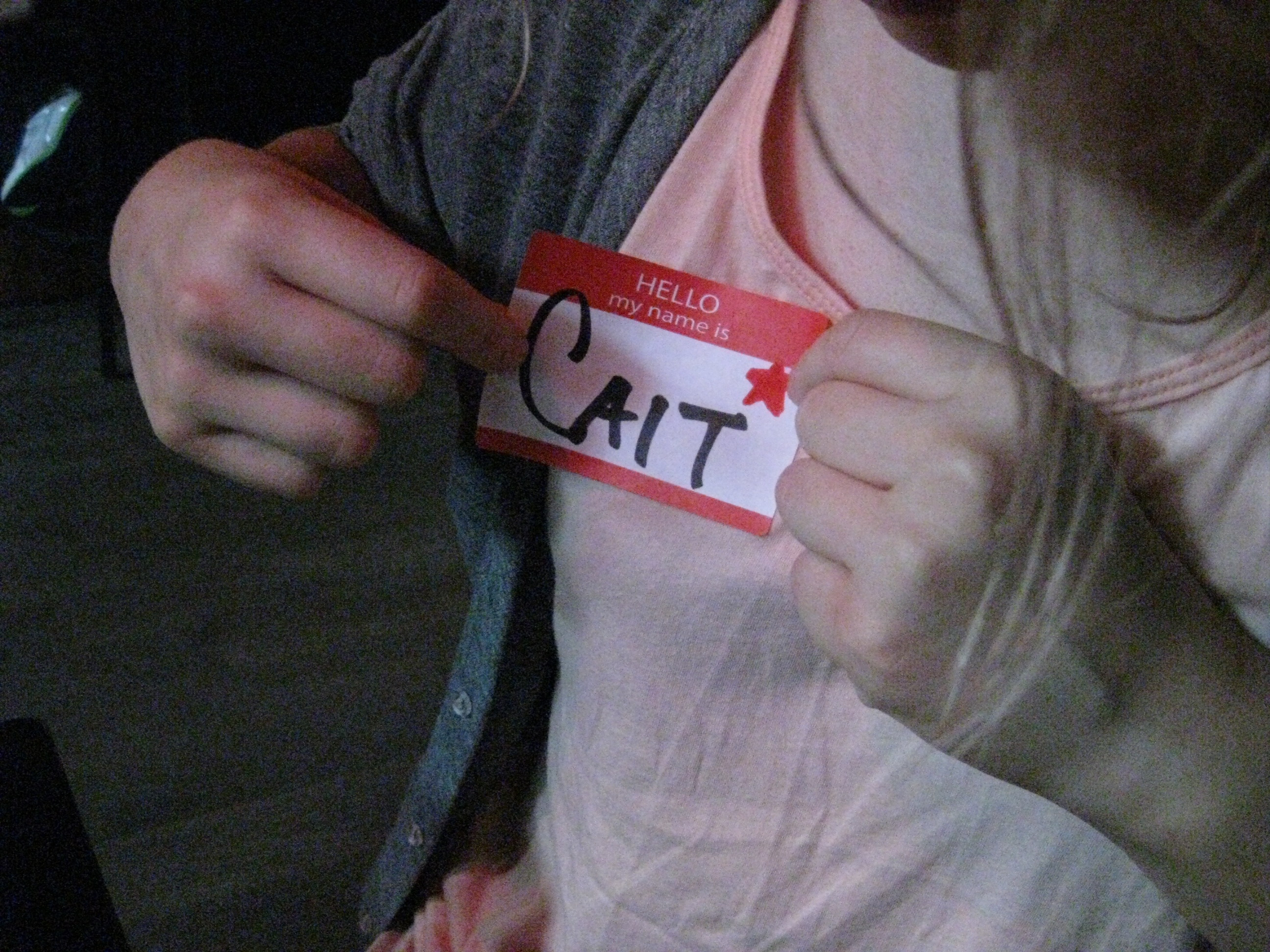
A name tag sticker reading "Hello my name is Cait"

A name tag or name badge is a badge or sticker worn on the outermost clothing as a means of displaying the wearer's name for others to view.

Name tags may be temporary, such as a sticker with a person's name, or it may be more durable. Temporary tags can be handwritten with the wearer's name, as in the iconic US design of "Hello! My Name Is ________", or fully printed. Permanent name tags are usually made of lightweight metal or plastic and may be known as name badges.

Name tags may be attached to garments with adhesive or worn with the assistance of a magnet, pin or velcro. Plastic or metal name tags can be attached to various backings used to attach to the clothing of the wearer. There are many types of name tag backings, including magnetic backings, pins and clips. Magnetic backings, which do not puncture clothing with pins, are a popular solution for name tags. Some name tags are worn around the neck using a lanyard or necklace.

Name tags with magnetic backings may be harmful to people who have pacemakers, as the magnet may interfere with the implant's normal function. It is suggested that people who have pacemakers use pinback backings with their name tags.

Name tags are used by some customer service companies, such as fast food restaurants, so that customers may identify employees by name. Professional employees or representatives of public-facing organizations such as universities, banks, or other companies where employees do not wear uniforms, may wear name tags as a way of distinguishing or identifying the bearer, while allowing the employee to wear daily business wear.

There is an emoji for japanese kindergarten name tags (📛) available with the Unicode U+1F4DB.

== Military ==
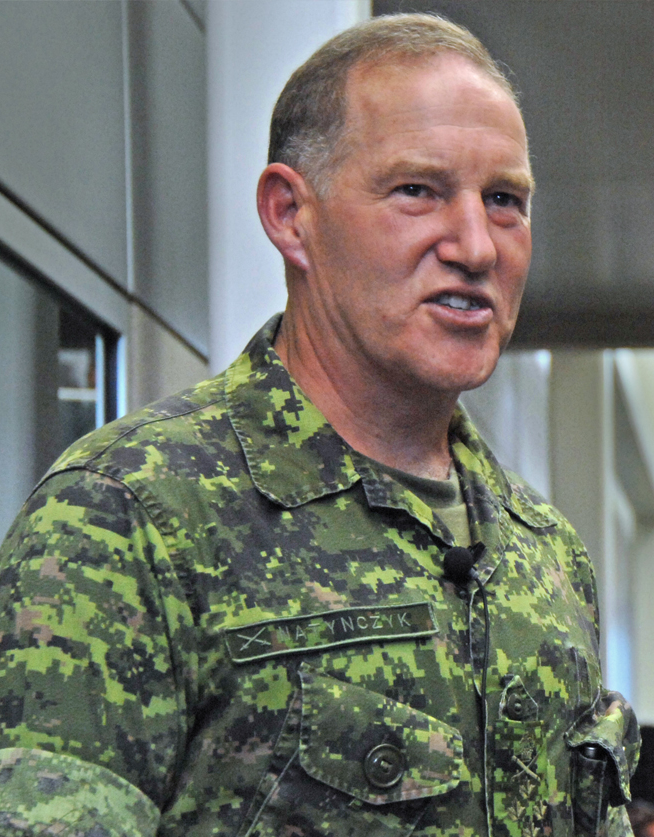
General Walter Natynczyk, wearing Canadian Forces CADPAT uniform with cloth name tag. This name tag also has a branch of service insignia (the crossed swords signify the Canadian Army).

Military personnel commonly wear name badges on their uniforms, generally on the right chest. In American and European militaries, the tag often display only the family (or last) name. Other armed forces use different conventions based on the local culture(s), as the last name alone may not be sufficiently distinct. For example, in the Singapore Armed Forces, Indian last names are generally initialised and the first name spelt in full. Some uniforms also include the name of the branch of service, generally on the left chest.

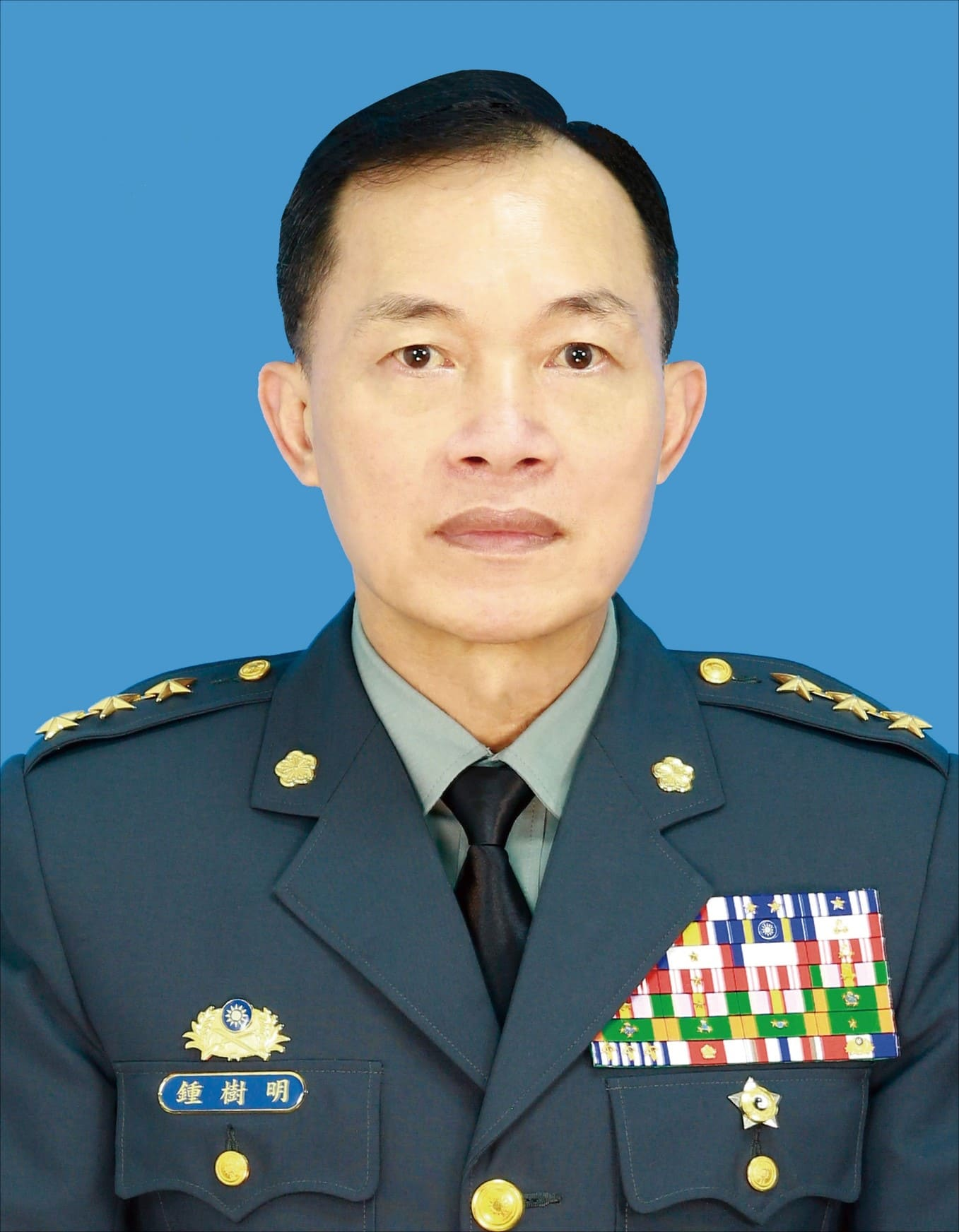
Republic of China Army (ROCA) General Chung Shu-ming, wearing a dress uniform with a metal name pin showing his full name in Chinese

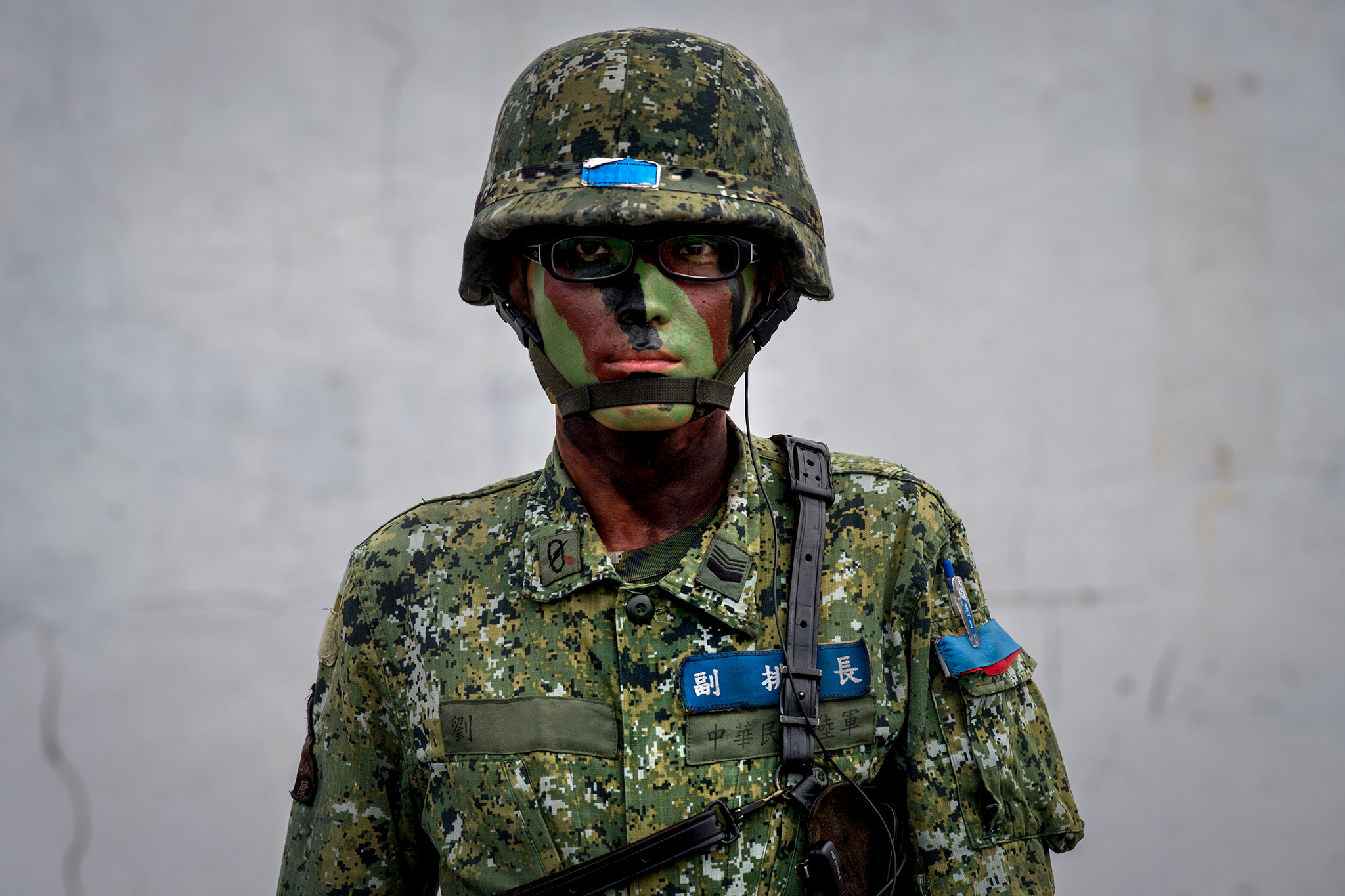
A second lieutenant of the ROCA, with cloth tapes showing rank (blue), name (given name blurred out), and branch of service, all in Chinese

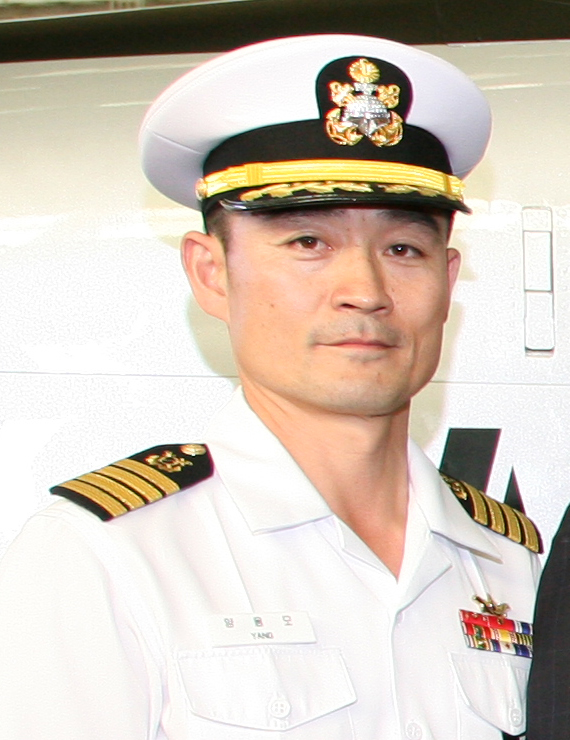
Republic of Korea Navy (ROKN) Captain Yang Yong-mo, wearing a plastic name tag showing his full name in Korean and last name in English

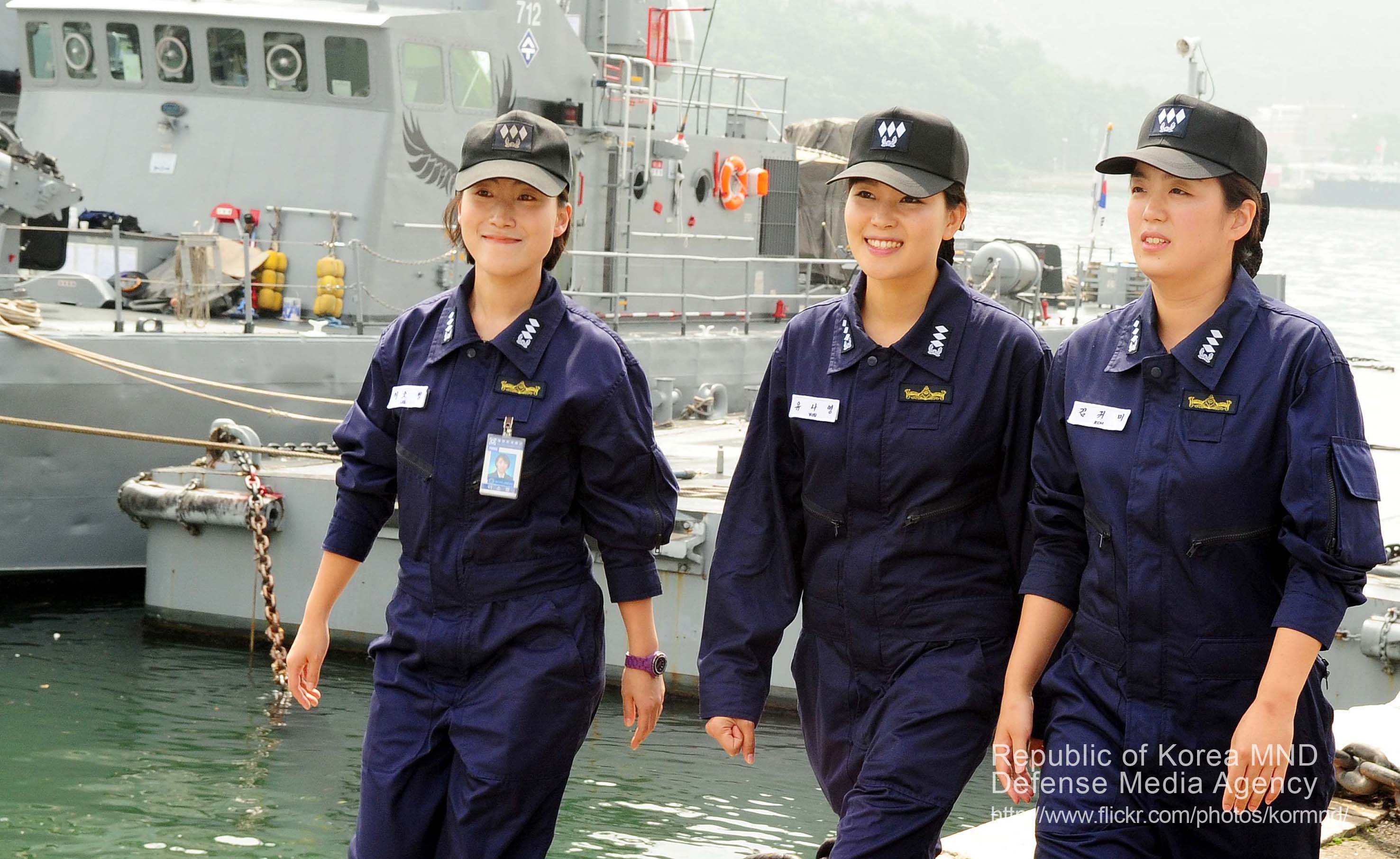
Three ROKN lieutenants wearing servicec uniforms with cloth name tag showing full name in Korean and last name in English

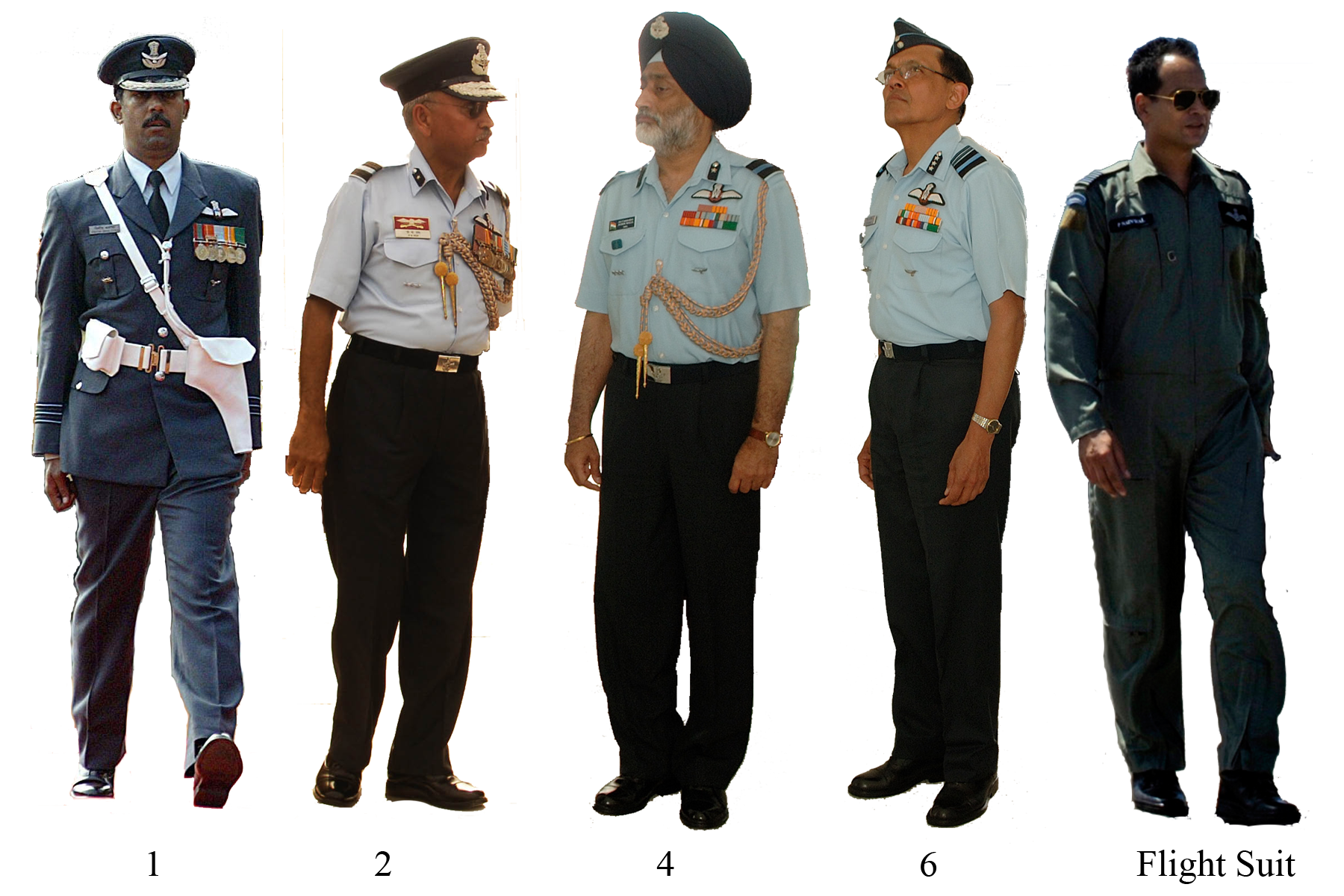
Indian Air Force uniforms, showing plastic bilingual name tags on ceremonial uniforms and an English cloth name tape on the flight suit

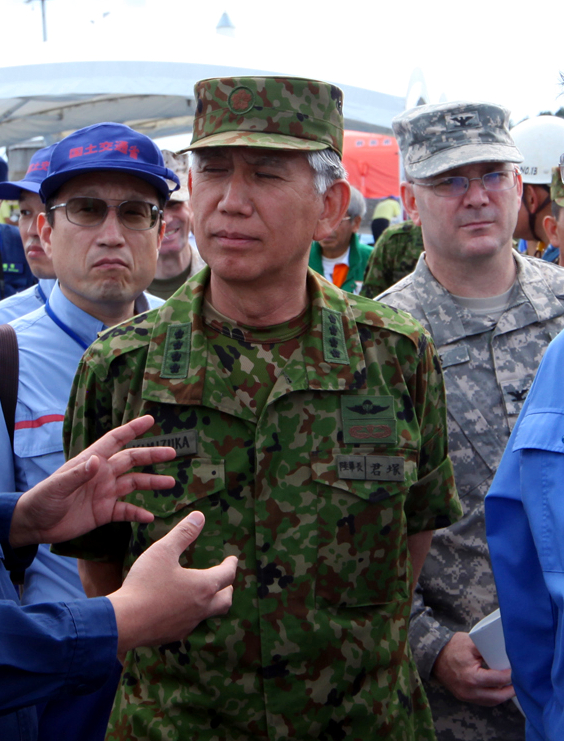
Former Chief of Staff of the Japan Ground Self-Defense Force Eiji Kimizuka. Cloth rank-surname tape in Japanese on left chest, cloth surname tape on right chest in English.

The use of name tags probably originated with laundry tags, used to identify clothing belonging to particular individuals. During World War II, the United States military began making use of external name tags, in particular on flight clothing and combat uniforms. The use of cloth name tapes became common by the Korean War and its use spread to other armies. The Canadian Army began using cloth name tapes on combat uniforms in the 1960s. During this period, the use of name tags extended to dress uniforms, and tags made of engraved plastic rather than cloth.

== Other professionals ==
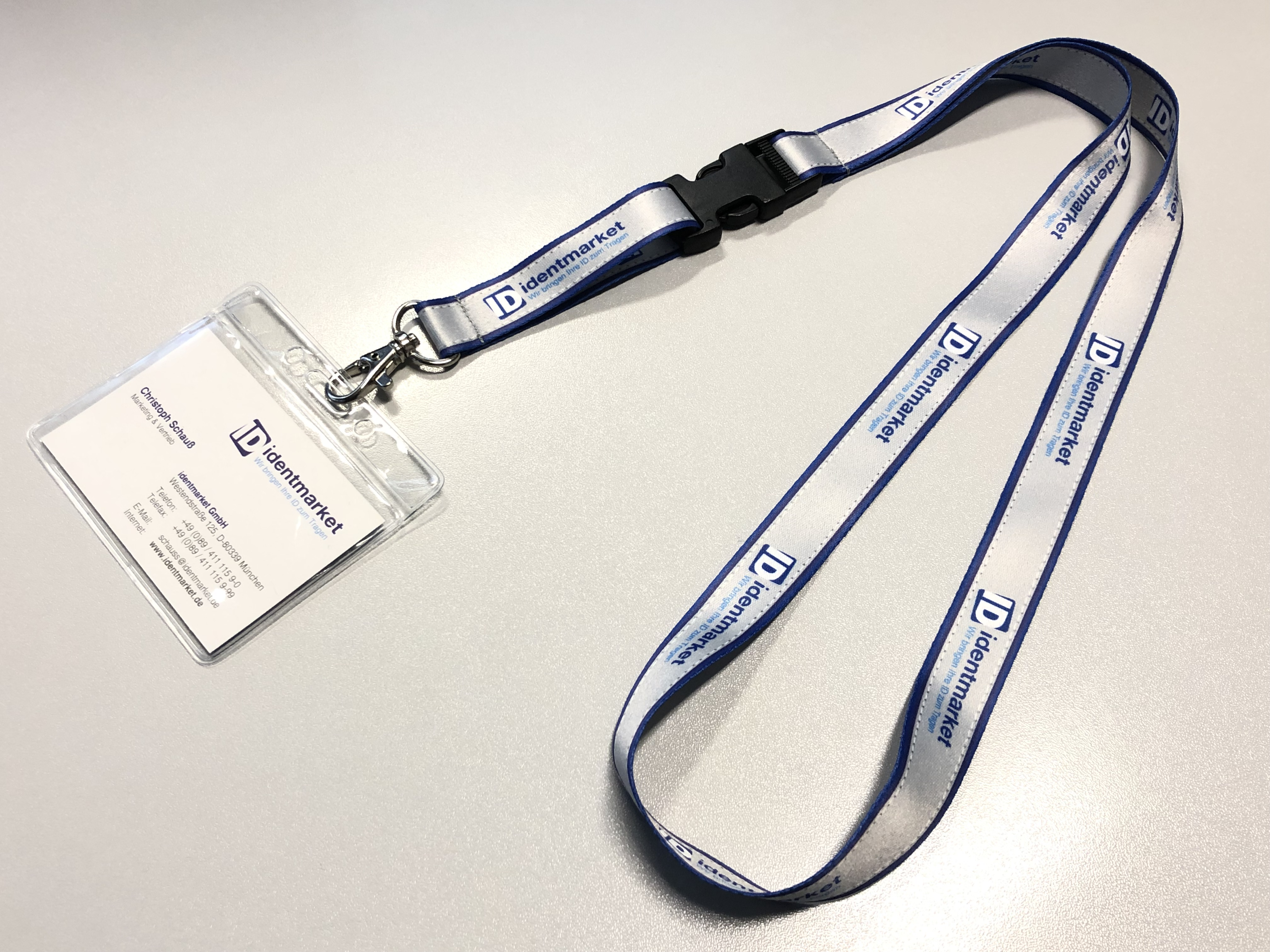
Lanyard name tag designed to be worn around the neck

Police officers usually often wear name tags on their uniforms that are separate from the badges that identify their official capacity as a law enforcement officer.

So that nametags have a degree of privacy, nametags may be attached with velcro which can be easily changed.

== Conventions ==
Associations of people gathering for conventions, and other events where socialization is encouraged, often wear name tags.

== "Hello my name is" stickers ==
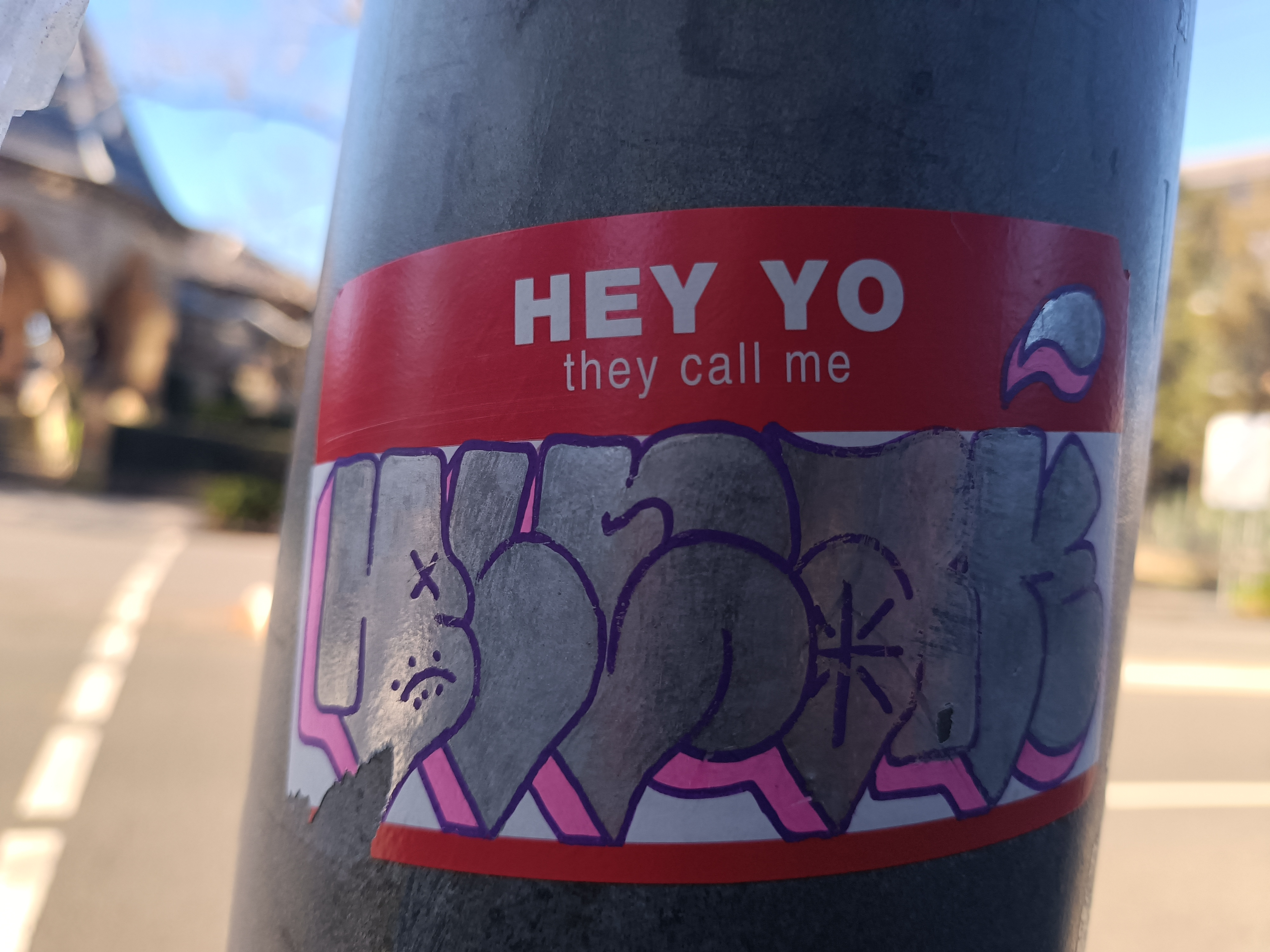
Graffiti usage of the "Hello my name is" sticker design; Sydney, 2024

"Hello my name is" stickers, first introduced by C-Line Products in 1959, went on to become widely used in both graffiti and sticker art.

== Name labels ==
In the United Kingdom and Ireland, iron-on or sticker name tags may be used for children's clothing, to help return items if lost. Cash's (J. & J. Cash Ltd) of Coventry, England, is a prominent manufacturer of woven name tapes.

== See also ==
- Nafudakake – Display of name tags in Japanese culture, especially at a dojo
