= Joachim Levy =

Swiss film director, screenwriter (born 1976)

Joachim Levy (born 1976) is a Swiss film director, screenwriter, showrunner.

== Biography ==
Joachim Levy was born in Geneva, Switzerland. He studied at the New York Film Academy, the Brooklyn College and the University of California, Los Angeles.

He began his film career as a production assistant in 1999 at Cineblast Productions, a New York-based film production company owned by producer Gill Holland.

From 2001 through 2007, Levy worked together with Thierry Guetta on Life Remote Control and on the Oscar nominated film Exit Through the Gift Shop, a film about the street artist Banksy.

In 2007 Levy became vice president of Six Point Films, working together with the double Oscar-winner Branko Lustig. Additionally he worked as director and film editor on a documentary about Buell Motorcycle Company, entitled Buell The Documentary, for Los Angeles-based Emmy Award winner and producer Steve Natt.

In 2012, Levy developed The Bank, a comedy drama series about soccer and glamor, starring Paz Vega, Rasha Bukvic, Gary Dourdan, Philippe Reinhardt. A few months later, his friend, producer Raphael Bonacchi (IMDB profile), joined him on the development of the TV Series.
