= The Next Step =

The Next Step may refer to:

== Music ==
- The Next Step (Kurt Rosenwinkel album), 2001
- The Next Step (People Under the Stairs album)
- The Next Step (James Brown album), 2002
- The Next Step, the backing band of Kamasi Washington on the 2005 album Live at 5th Street Dick's
- "Next Step", a song by Moka Only and Chief from Crickets, 2011

== Film and television ==
- The Next Step (film), 1997 film.
- The Next Step (1991 TV series), American technology magazine television show
- The Next Step (2013 TV series), Canadian drama series about young dancers
- "The Next Step", a season 4 episode of the TV series Everwood

== Other uses ==
- The Next Step, a newspaper published by the Revolutionary Communist Party in the UK from 1978 to 1988

== See also ==
- Next Step (disambiguation)
- Next (disambiguation)
- Step (disambiguation)
