= Exit Through the Gift Shop =

2010 documentary film by Banksy

- Directed by: Banksy
- Produced by: Jaimie D'Cruz
- Starring: Banksy; Mr. Brainwash; Shepard Fairey; Invader
- Narrated by: Rhys Ifans
- Edited by: Chris King; Tom Fulford
- Music by: Geoff Barrow
- Production company: Paranoid Pictures
- Distributed by: Revolver Entertainment
- Release dates: 24 January 2010 (Sundance); 5 March 2010 (United Kingdom)
- Running time: 86 minutes
- Country: United Kingdom
- Languages: English; French
- Box office: $5.3 million

Exit Through the Gift Shop is a 2010 British documentary film directed by street artist Banksy. It tells the story of Thierry Guetta, a French immigrant in Los Angeles who, over several years, filmed a host of street artists at work, including Shepard Fairey and Banksy, but failed to do anything with the footage. Eventually, Banksy decided to use the footage to make a documentary, which includes new footage depicting Guetta's rise to fame as the artist "Mr. Brainwash". In addition to narration read by Rhys Ifans, the story is largely related by Banksy himself, whose face is obscured and voice altered to preserve his anonymity. Geoff Barrow composed the film's score, and Richard Hawley's "Tonight The Streets Are Ours" plays during the opening and closing credits. The film premiered at the 2010 Sundance Film Festival on 24 January 2010, and was nominated for Best Documentary Feature at the 83rd Academy Awards.

Since its release, there has been extensive debate over whether the film is a genuine documentary or a mockumentary. When asked if the film was real, Banksy simply replied, "Yes."

== Synopsis ==
Thierry Guetta is a French immigrant living in Los Angeles, who runs a successful upscale vintage clothing shop and obsessively films his life. While visiting France in 1999, Guetta discovers his cousin is famed street artist Invader. Fascinated, he accompanies Invader and his friends, who include Monsieur André and Zevs, on their nocturnal adventures, documenting everything.

A few months later, Invader visits Guetta in LA and arranges a meeting with Shepard Fairey. Guetta continues to film Fairey after Invader returns to France, and when Fairey asks what Guetta plans to do with the footage, Guetta says he is going to make a documentary about street art. He follows Fairey as Fairey travels the world executing the OBEY Giant campaign, and films numerous artists at work, among them Poster Boy, Seizer, Neck Face, Sweet Toof, Cyclops, Ron English, Dotmasters, Swoon, Azil, Borf, and Buff Monster. However, in reality, Guetta merely likes to film things and has no intention of making a film out of the footage, which he never watches, simply dumping the tapes into boxes.

Guetta becomes obsessed with filming the mysterious Banksy, but can't arrange an introduction. Then, in the spring of 2006, Banksy's visit to LA is complicated when his usual accomplice is turned back at the border control, so he contacts Fairey, who recommends that Guetta would make a good guide. Things go well, and Banksy invites Guetta to England to film the production and deployment of his "Murdered Phone Booth" piece, including the crowd reaction. This confuses Banksy's crew, who are used to secrecy, but Banksy sees value in documenting street art, which he admits typically has a "short lifespan". After Guetta returns home, he begins to put up his own stickers and posters.

When Banksy is back in LA preparing for his Barely Legal show, he takes Guetta to Disneyland to film the reaction after he deploys an inflatable doll dressed like a Guantanamo Bay detainee there. Guetta is caught and interrogated by security but can stash the videotape in his sock and delete his still photographs, so he is released after four hours. Following this, Banksy admits he began to trust Guetta implicitly.

"Barely Legal" is a huge success, and the price of street art begins to skyrocket in auction houses. Banksy is stunned by the sudden hype and urges Guetta to finish his documentary to show what the movement is really about. Over the next six months, Guetta turns his several thousand hours of footage into a film titled Life Remote Control: an unfocused 90 minutes of disorienting fast cutting. Banksy deems it "unwatchable", but feels that the street art footage itself is valuable, and decides to try and produce a film himself; to distract Guetta, he suggests him to go home, make some art, and put on a show.

"I think the joke is on... I don’t know who the joke is on, really. I don’t even know if there is a joke."

— Banksy's former spokesman Steve Lazarides

Adopting the name "Mr. Brainwash", Guetta mortgages his business and home to rent equipment, hires a production team to create art under his supervision, and rents the 15,000 square-foot former CBS Studios complex for his first show, "Life Is Beautiful". As the show date approaches, Banksy becomes worried that things are going out of control and sends some professionals to help, who take care of the show's practical considerations, while Guetta focuses on publicity. He gets quotes from Fairey and Banksy, after which the LA Weekly does a cover story about the show, even though at that point he has yet to choose which of his team's works he wants to include. The press leads private art collectors to call Guetta about buying pieces before the opening, and he quotes prices of tens of thousands of dollars.

On the day of the opening, the nearly 200 paintings finally arrive to be hung, but Guetta is busy giving interviews, so the crew decides where to put them. The doors open, and over 4,000 people saw the show that day. Almost a million dollars' worth of Guetta's art is sold the first week of the show, which is extended by two months, and his pieces are included in shows and galleries around the world. The success of Mr. Brainwash confuses Banksy and Fairey, who found Guetta derivative and unready for the world stage, but Guetta insists time would tell whether or not he is a real artist. The closing titles reveal Guetta went on to create the cover artwork for Madonna's hits collection Celebration.

== Production ==
About the film's arduous editing process, Banksy said: "I spent a year [...] watching footage of sweaty vandals falling off ladders", and "The film was made by a very small team. It would have been even smaller if the editors didn't keep having mental breakdowns. They went through over 10,000 hours of Thierry's tapes and got literally seconds of usable footage out of it." Producer Jaimie D'Cruz wrote in his production diary that obtaining the original tapes from Guetta was particularly complicated.

== Release and reception ==
Film industry veterans John Sloss and Bart Walker founded a new distribution company, Producers Distribution Agency (PDA), to release the film in the US, and the company employed a unique grassroots promotional campaign. The film earned $3.29 million at the American box office, and Oscilloscope Laboratories released it on DVD and Blu-ray in 2011.

The film received overwhelmingly positive reviews. On review aggregator website Rotten Tomatoes, it holds an approval rating of 96% based on 116 reviews, with an average rating of 8.10/10; the site's "critics consensus" reads: "An amusing, engrossing look at underground art, Exit Through the Gift Shop entertains as it deflates the myths and hype surrounding its subjects." On Metacritic, the film has a weighted average score of 85 out of 100, based on 27 critics, indicating "universal acclaim". French journalist Marjolaine Gout gave the film 4 out of 5 stars, while linking Mr. Brainwash to Jeff Koons and criticizing Thierry Guetta's work as "artistic toilet papering".

At the 83rd Academy Awards, the film was nominated for Best Documentary Feature. The New York Film Critics Online bestowed its Best Documentary Award on the film in 2010.

=== Hoax speculation ===
One consistent theme in reviews of the film was whether or not it was an elaborate ruse by Banksy. For example, Jeannette Catsoulis of The New York Times wrote that the film "could be a new subgenre: the prankumentary", while Ty Burr of The Boston Globe, who found the film to be quite entertaining and awarded it four out of four stars, dismissed the notion of it being a "put on", writing: "I'm not buying it; for one thing, this story's too good, too weirdly rich, to be made up. For another, the movie's gently amused scorn lands on everyone." Roger Ebert, who gave the film 3.5 out of 4 stars, wrote: "The widespread speculation that Exit Through the Gift Shop is a hoax only adds to its fascination", adding that he believed the film was real.

In an interview with SuicideGirls, producer Jaimie D'Cruz and editor Chris King denied the film was a hoax and expressed their growing frustration with speculation it was. King said: "For a while we all thought that was quite funny, but it went on for so long. It was a bit disappointing when it became basically accepted as fact, that it was all just a silly hoax I felt it was a shame that the whole thing was going to be dismissed like that really – because we knew it was true." Cruz said: "It pisses me off when you read in serious newspapers that the film is a mockumentary. That's not true."

For his part, Guetta said: "This movie is 100% real. Banksy captured me becoming an artist. In the end, I became his biggest work of art."

=== Copyright issues ===
Following the release of the film, Glen Friedman, an American photographer, sued Guetta over his use of a photograph of the rap group Run-DMC taken by Friedman. Though Guetta claimed he had altered the original image enough for the result to be considered an original piece of art, the presiding judge, Judge Pregerson, ruled Friedman's photograph was protected under the transformative fair use law. Guetta also faced copyright claims from Joachim Levy, a Swiss filmmaker who edited and produced Guetta's film Life Remote Control, clips of which were included in Exit Through the Gift Shop, as Levy was not credited for his work, but Guetta owned the footage, which was licensed to Banksy.

Banksy had coincidentally chosen the name of the existing band Exit Through the Gift Shop. He gifted his work Brace Yourself (2010), valued then at £200,000, to the band in exchange for the rights to their name. In 2023, the band sold the artwork on for over $2 million, with the art itself having been valued only at $600,000. Some of the proceeds went to the charity MusiCares, providing help to those in the music industry.

== Archival footage ==
The film's opening montage includes archival footage from the following street art films: Dirty Hands: The Art and Crimes of David Choe, Infamy, Inside Outside, Next The Movie, Open Air, The Lyfe, Popaganda: The Art and Crimes of Ron English, Rash, Restless Debt of the Third World, Spending Time with Poster Boy, Turf War, Elis G The Life of a Shadow, Memoria Canalla, C215 in London, You Are Beautiful, and Beautiful Losers.

== See also ==
- List of works by Banksy
