= NXT =

NXT may refer to:

== Sports ==
- Indy NXT ("NXT"), open-wheel open-cockpit motorsports series, formerly Indy Lights ("Lights")

=== Professional wrestling ===
- WWE NXT, a professional wrestling television program produced by WWE that began in 2010
  - NXT (WWE brand), WWE's Florida-based brand and developmental territory
- NXT UK, the British spin-off of NXT featuring the namesake brand
  - NXT UK (WWE brand) WWE's United Kingdom-based brand

== Groups, companies, organizations ==
- NextDC (ASX ticker NXT), Australian data centre operator
- Centre Alliance, an Australian political party formerly known as the Nick Xenophon Team that traded under the NXT brand
- Nextpower (Nasdaq ticker NXT)

== Products ==
- Nxt, a cryptocurrency started in November 2013
- Lego Mindstorms NXT, a kit for building robots with Lego bricks created in 2006
- Sharp Nemesis NXT, a kit-built racing aircraft
- NXT, a COVID-aware smart-workplace platform developed by NetSol Technologies

== Other ==
- NXT record, an obsolete DNS resource record type; see List of DNS record types#NXT

== See also ==
- Next (disambiguation)
