= Next Step =

Next Step or Nextstep may refer to:

- NeXTSTEP, a UNIX-based computer operating system developed by NeXT in the 1980s and 1990s
  - OpenStep, an open platform version of NeXTSTEP originated by Sun Microsystems and NeXT
    - Rhapsody (operating system), the Apple Macintosh NeXTSTEP/classic Mac OS hybrid predecessor to macOS
      - Darwin (operating system), the open source version of macOS
  - GNUstep, an open source version of NeXTSTEP originated by the GNU Organization
- Next Space Technologies for Exploration Partnerships (NextSTEP), a NASA program
- Next Step Tour, a 1999 tour by the British pop group Steps
- Nextstep (magazine), an American magazine for high school students

== See also ==
- The Next Step (disambiguation)
- NeXstep, a brand of Coca-Cola Co.
- NexStep, a polyurethane product from Interface, Inc.
- Next (disambiguation)
- Step (disambiguation)
