= NEX =

NEX or Nex may refer to:

== Things ==
- Nex, Singapore, a shopping mall in Serangoon, Singapore
- Nex Entertainment, a Japanese video game developer
- NEX Group, a UK-based financial services firm
- NEX Stock Exchange, a defunct stock exchange from Montenegro
- Nex Team Inc., developer of video game console Nex Playground
- Generation NEX, a Nintendo video game clone
- Narita Express (N'EX), a Japanese train service
- Navy Exchange or base exchange, the US Navy retail store chain
- Pepsi NEX, a variation of Pepsi
- Sony NEX (New E-mount eXperience), a trading name of the Sony E-mount system
- NEXtv, a Panamanian television channel
- Post Human: Nex Gen, an album by Bring Me the Horizon, 2024

== People ==
- Christiane Nex (born 1973), Italian ski mountaineer
- Nex Benedict (2008–2024), American non-binary student

== See also ==
- Next (disambiguation)
- Nexus (disambiguation)
