= Buff Monster =

American painter

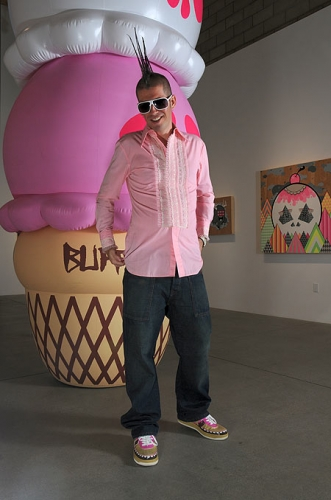
- Buff Monster with his work, circa 2011
- Born: April 14, 1979 (age 47); Hawaii, U.S.
- Education: University of Southern California
- Occupation: Artist
- Years active: 2000–present
- Known for: Painting, drawing, graphic design, sculpture
- Movement: Lowbrow, designer toy
- Website: buffmonster.com

Buff Monster (born April 14, 1979) is an American painter. His work is characterized by happy characters living in brightly colored bubbly landscapes.

Buff Monster was born in Hawaii and graduated from the University of Southern California with a fine arts major.

He made a name for himself by putting up thousands of hand-silkscreened posters across Los Angeles. Along with his paintings, he has created a range of merchandise, from prints and stickers to vinyl toys and plush. In 2012 he created a homage to Garbage Pail Kids called The Melty Misfits; a collection of vintage-style trading cards, complete with wax wrapper.

The color pink, a symbol of confidence, individuality and happiness, is present in everything he creates. He cites heavy metal music, ice cream and Japanese culture as major influences. His work has been shown in galleries worldwide, often accompanied by large installations. In 2010, the Bristol City Museum acquired a painting of his for their permanent collection. His art has been published in a variety of magazines, websites, newspapers and books, including Juxtapoz, Paper, Nylon, Cool Hunting, Angeleno, the Los Angeles Times, LA Weekly and The New York Times. He was also featured in Banksy's movie: Exit Through the Gift Shop.

In 2012, Buff Monster moved from Los Angeles to live and work in New York City.
