= Invader (artist) =

French urban artist

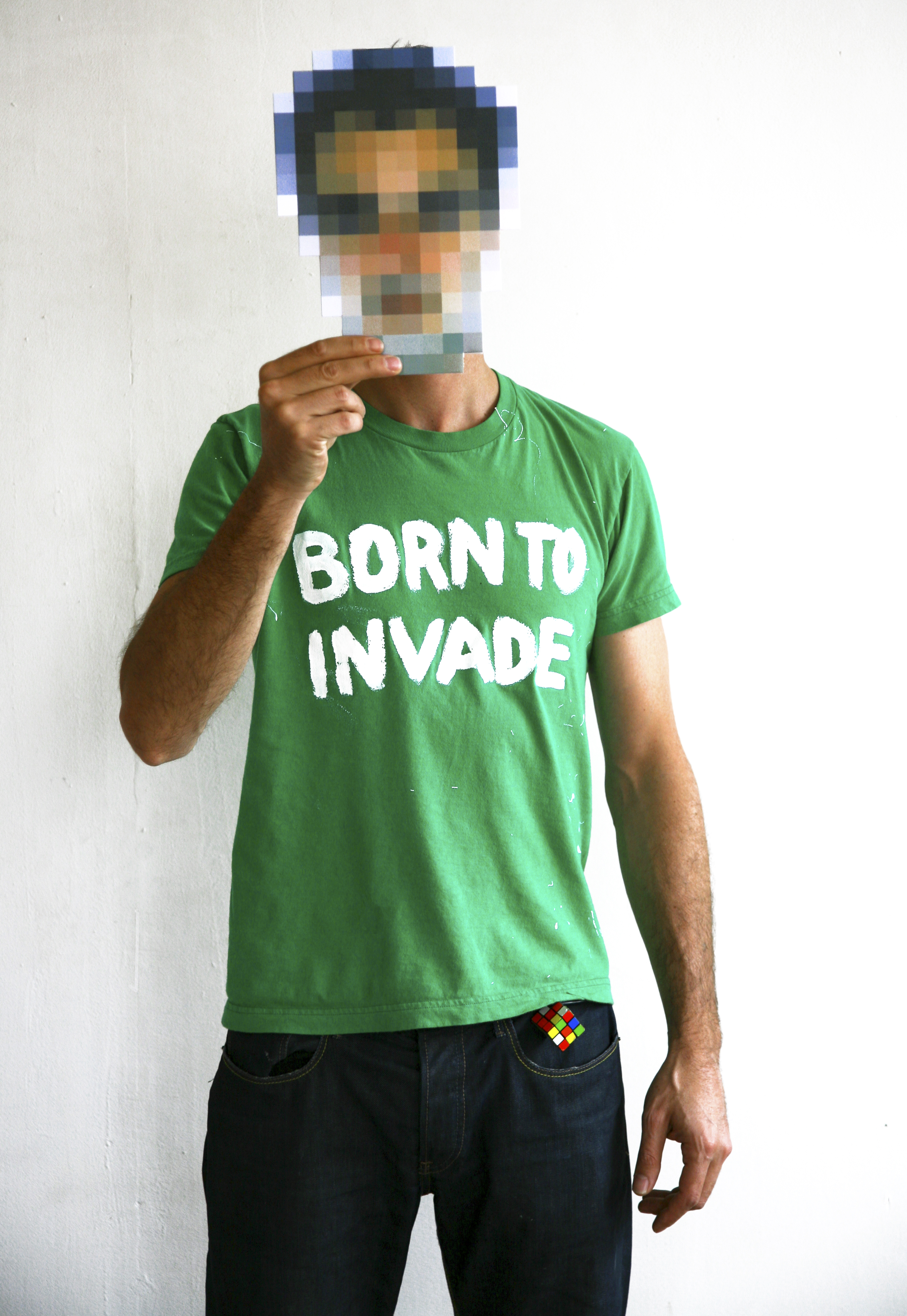
- Born: 1969 (age 56–57); France
- Education: École des Beaux-Arts
- Known for: Space Invader logos
- Style: Street art
- Movement: Graffiti

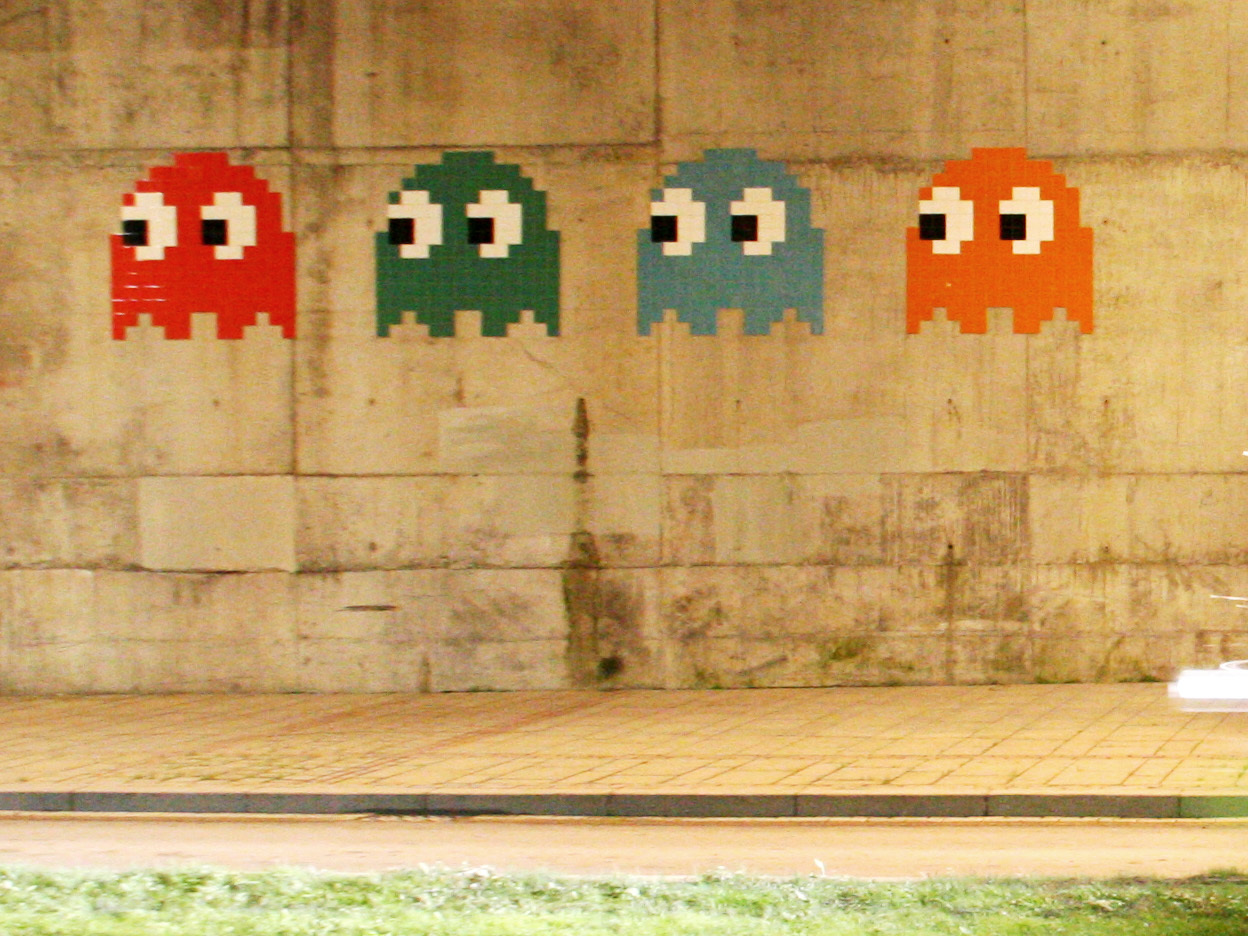
The ghosts from the arcade game Pac-Man. A mosaic by Invader in Bilbao, Spain (BBO 24–27), near the Guggenheim Museum. 2008

Invader is a pseudonymous French street artist. He is known for his ceramic tile mosaics modeled on the pixelated art of 1970s–1980s 8-bit video games, many of which depict the titular aliens from the arcade game Space Invaders which is where the inspiration for his pseudonym comes from, as well as the main character and the ghosts from Pac-Man and several characters from Super Mario Bros.. As of November 2026, his creations can be seen in highly visible locations in 79 cities in 20 countries and to accompany his citywide installations, or "Invasions", Invader publishes books, short films and maps as guides to the locations of his mosaics.

Invader also makes mosaics using QR codes and stacks of Rubik's Cubes with the Rubik's Cubes typically being installed indoors.

== History ==
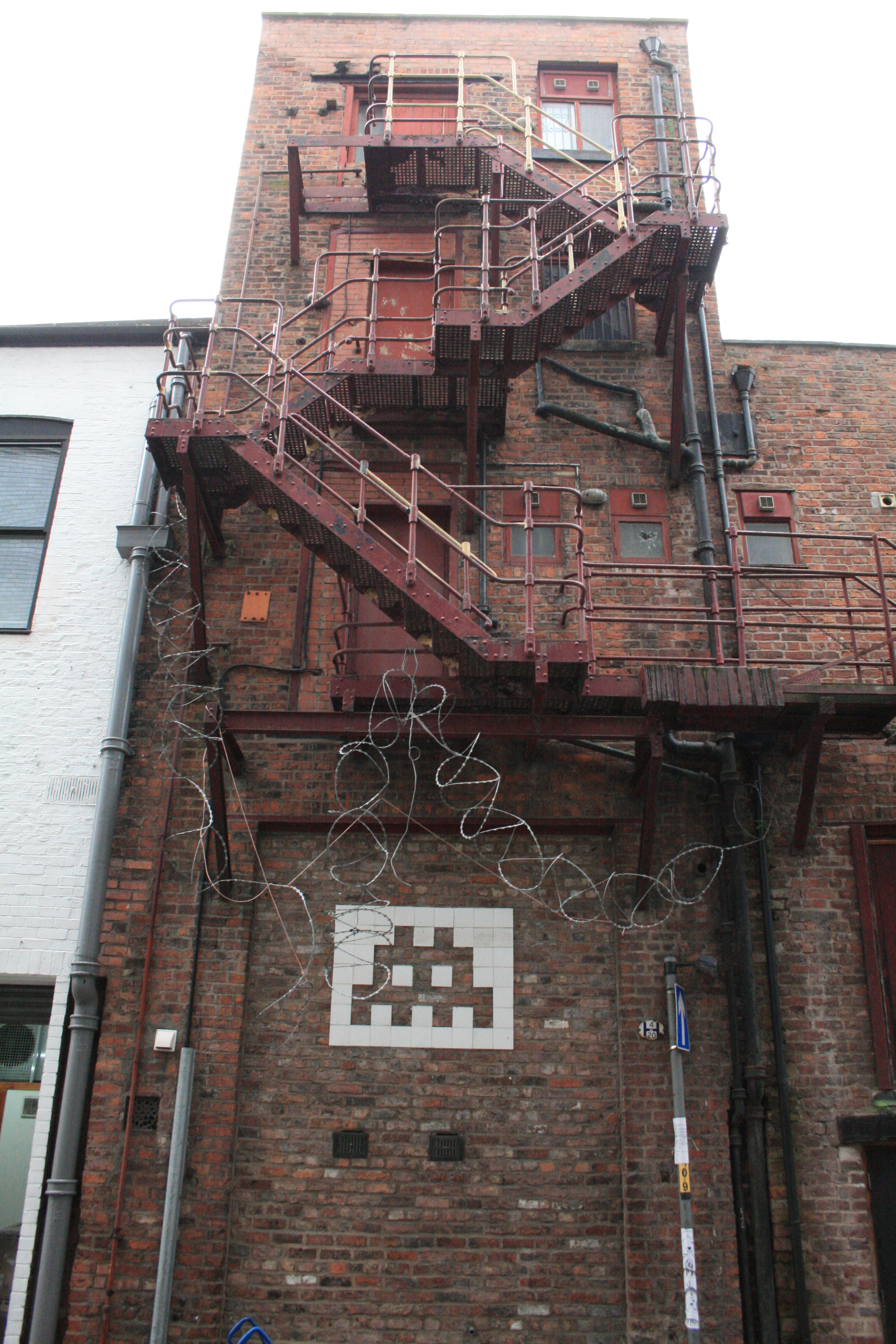
One of Invader's aliens (MAN 47) on a wall in Manchester, England, installed in 2004

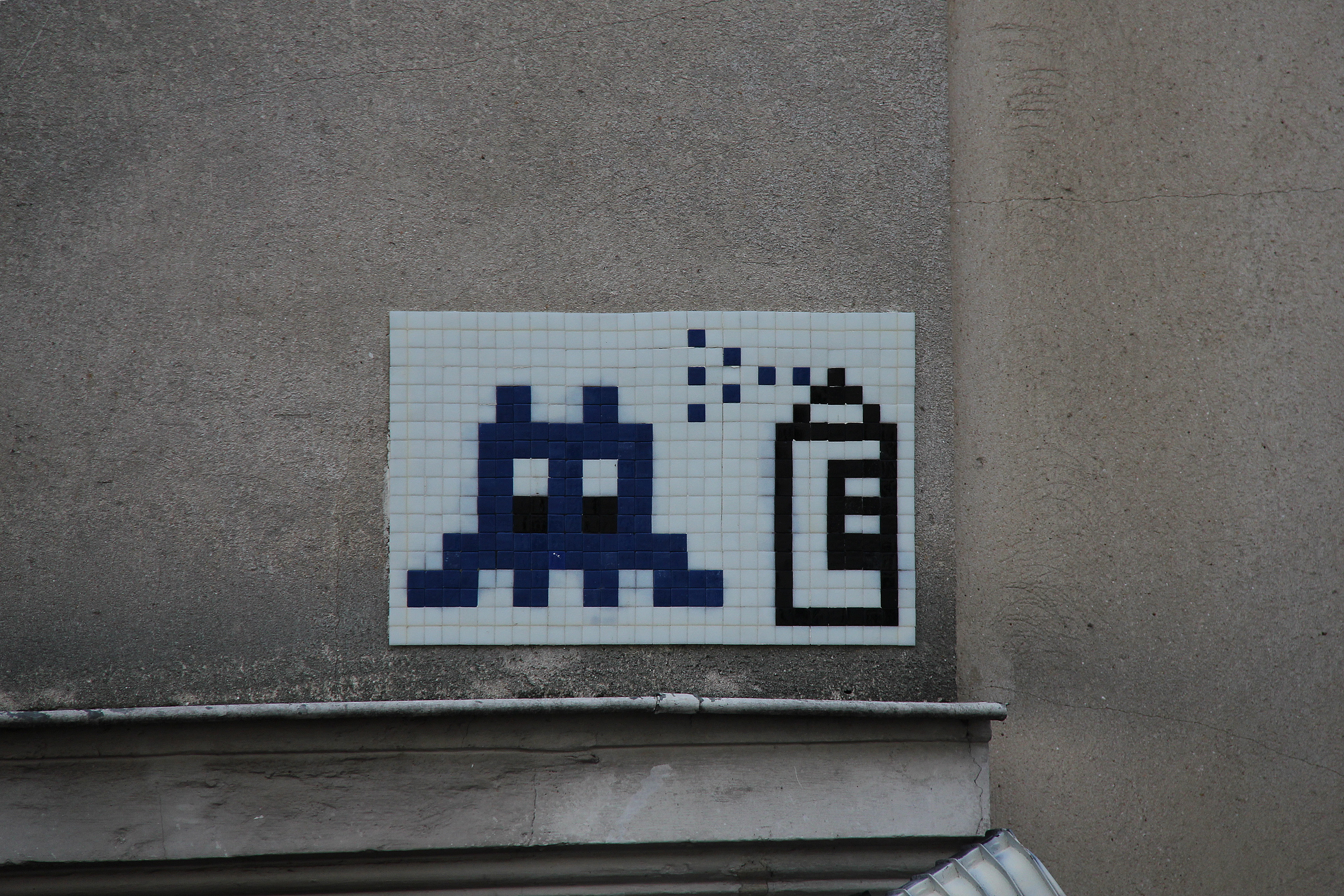
Another work of an alien from Space Invaders in Paris. 2010

A graduate of a Parisian École des Beaux-Arts, Invader initially derived inspiration for his creations from the video games he played when he was growing up in the 1970s and 80s. Using tiles to represent the pixels in the games' 8-bit graphics, Invader began making mosaics in Paris in the 1990s, and went on to install mosaics in 31 other cities in France.

Invader has since staged "invasions" in cities and countries worldwide, including seven in New York City and three in Hong Kong. He often installs mosaics in culturally and/or historically important locations, with one high-profile example being his 31 December 1999 mosaic on the letter D of the Hollywood Sign marking the Y2K bug. During subsequent trips to Los Angeles, he also placed mosaics on the eight other letters of the sign.

Paris remains a primary location for the artist's work; in June 2011, Invader marked the installation of his 1,000th work in Paris with an exhibition at La Générale entitled 1000. Since 2000, he has also installed more than 70 pieces of work around Hong Kong. As of January 2020, Invader had created mosaics in 79 cities, with 3,858 Space Invaders comprising over 1.5 million ceramic tiles, and had published 24 "invasion maps."

In 2012, Invader made a short film Art4Space documenting his attempt to launch one of his aliens into space on a modified weather balloon.

Invader also makes QR code mosaics using black and white tiles. The patterns can be easily decoded using standard QR reader smartphone apps; one such message, when decoded, reads, "This is an invasion."

Invader installations have become desirable collectors' pieces, to the point where some works have been stolen off of the walls upon which they were installed.

== Identity ==
Multiple sources have identified Franck Slama as Invader. Invader works incognito, often masked and largely at night. To guard his anonymity on camera during interviews, he pixellates his own image or wears a mask. He claims that only a few people know his real name and his face and that his parents think he works as a tiler in the construction industry.

== Modus operandi ==
Invader sees himself as a "hacker" of public space spreading a mosaic "virus". He believes that museums and galleries are not accessible to everyone, and so installs his work at street level for ordinary people to enjoy on a daily basis.

The sites for his mosaics are often chosen for their visibility, local interest and symbolism. No two pieces are alike.

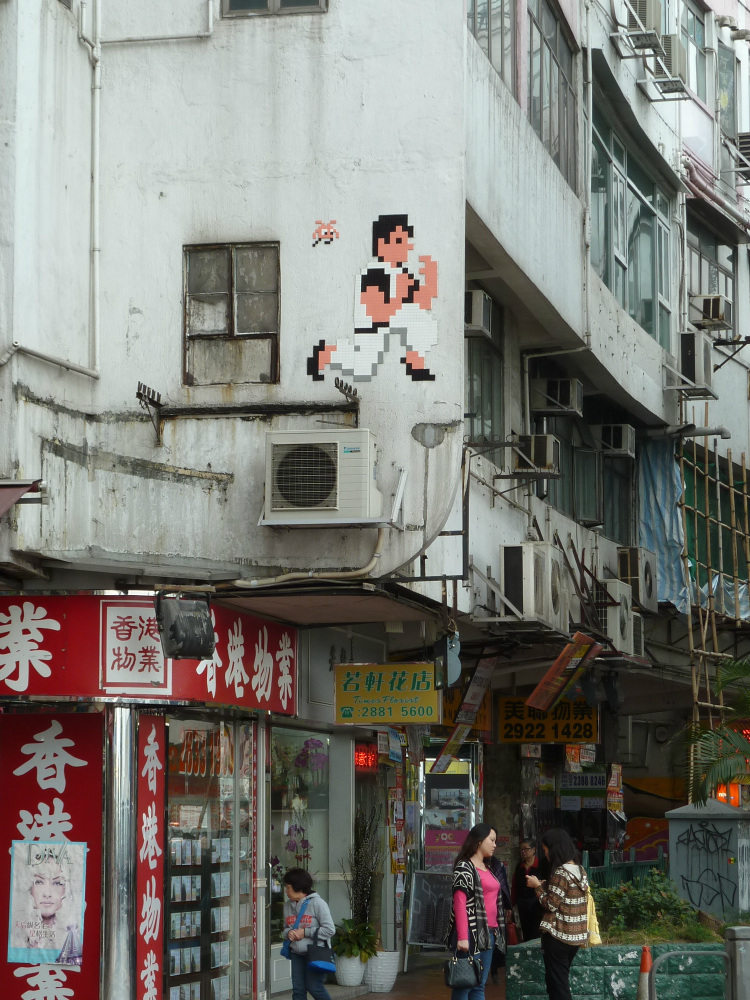
Thomas from Kung Fu Master (HK 56) on Cannon Street (景隆街), Hong Kong (2014)

Although many of his works feature his signature aliens, Invader's repertoire of subjects also includes Star Wars characters, the Pink Panther, Mega Man, Spider-Man, Hong Kong Phooey, Thomas from Kung-Fu Master and Popeye. The subject matter may also be themed and adapted to a particular location; sites near major bank buildings might be marked with dollar sign mosaics, while those in Hong Kong often have an oriental theme.

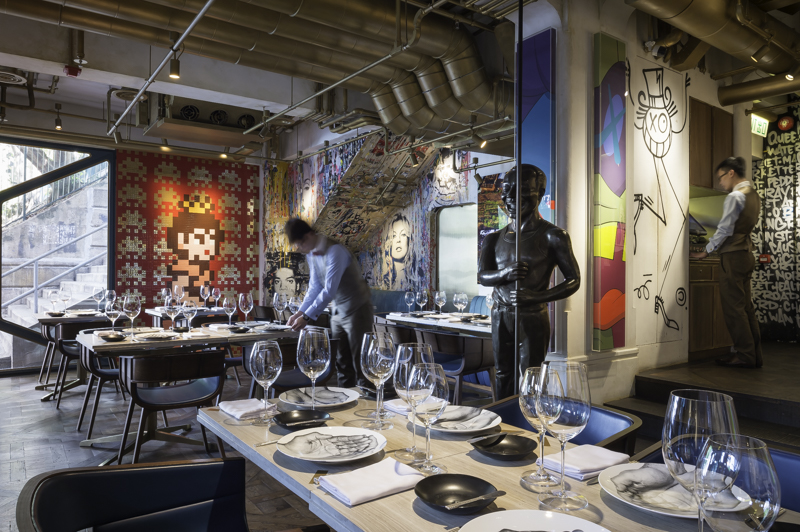
A revamped Mario Princess, installed at Bibo, a restaurant on Hollywood Road in Hong Kong, in 2014.

Each "invasion" usually takes around two or three weeks, with the actual installations taking at least a week. The mosaics are mapped, catalogued and photographed to indicate their locations within a city; using this data, the artist then prints and distributes city "invasion maps". Smartphone users can also hunt for mosaics globally using the "FlashInvaders" app. In Montpellier, locations were chosen so that, when plotted on a map, they form an image of a giant Space Invaders alien.

More recently, Invader has adopted strategies to avoid the removal of his works. Since the 2010s, when his works became highly sought after by art collectors and theft became a real concern, he has begun to choose sites that are more difficult to reach and to create larger works with more delicate tiles that cannot be removed without damaging the piece. He has also taken steps against legal action; in late 2015, while planning another "invasion" in New York City, he put out a call on social media for building owners who would be willing to host his mosaics legally.

== Rubikcubism ==
Since 2004, Invader has also created a series of works, typically for indoor display, exclusively using Rubik's Cubes (a style the artist calls "Rubikcubism," a play on the Cubist art movement of the early 20th century). Using a computer program, the artist works out the precise distribution of the six colors on a Rubik's Cube required to achieve the desired image; he then manipulates one side of each Rubik's Cube to reach the required pattern. Stacking the cubes eventually produces a full image, which is then glued to a backing board. Each piece is typically composed of approximately 300 cubes, measures about 0.9 by 1.3 metres (3 ft × 4 ft), and weighs approximately 36 kilograms (80 lb), though the exact dimensions depend on the subject and the level of detail.

The works are organized into three series: "Bad Men," comprising portraits of famous villains such as Osama bin Laden, Jaws and Al Capone; "Masterpieces," which reproduces famous paintings by artists such as Delacroix, Warhol, Seurat, and Lichtenstein; and "Low Fidelity," based on iconic album art such as Country Life, The Velvet Underground & Nico, and Nevermind. Among the images Invader has created using this technique are those of the Mona Lisa and the Dalai Lama; he received particular attention for a 2005 portrait of Florence Rey.

== Reception ==
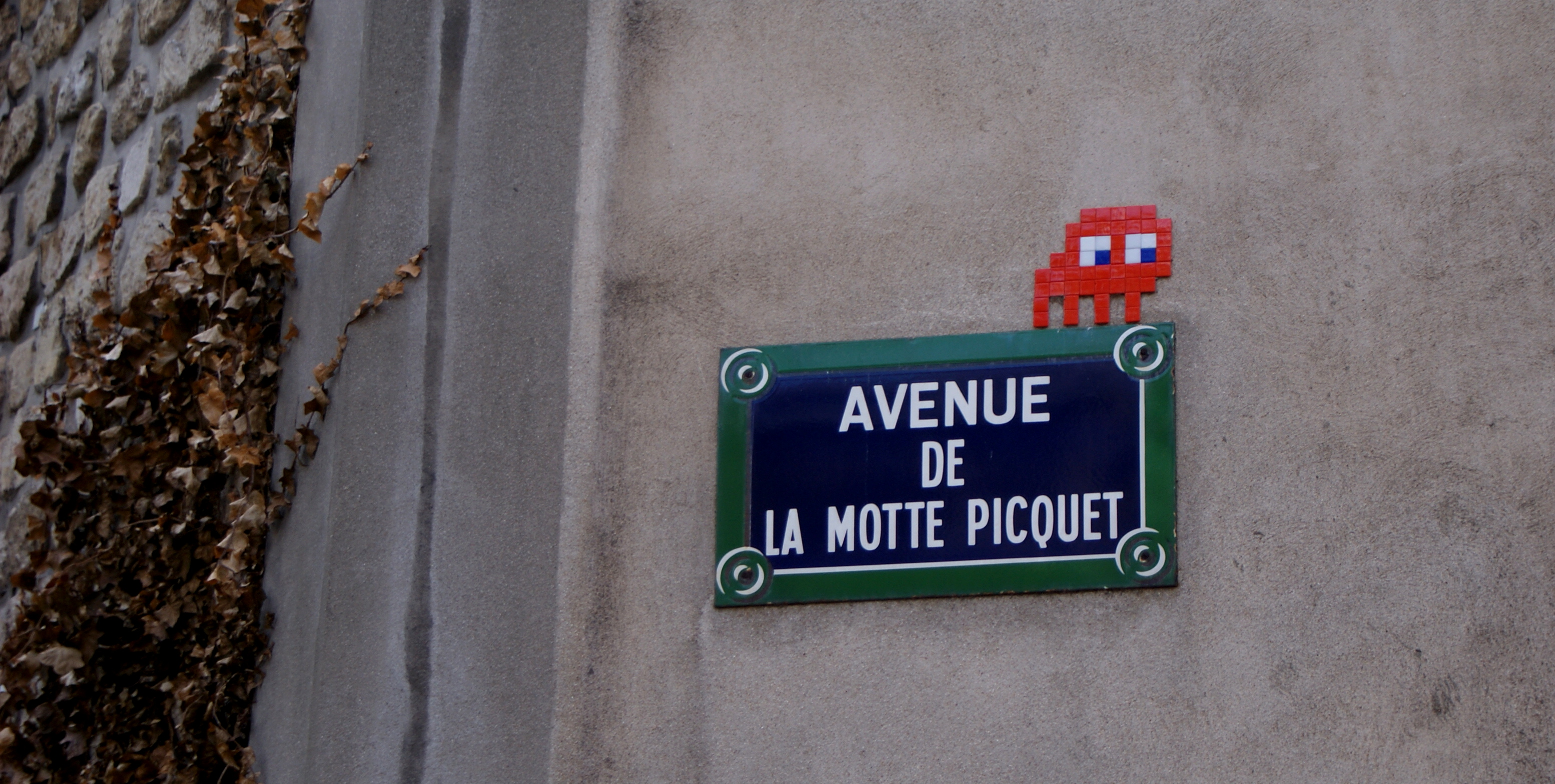
Tile mosaic of a ghost from Pac-Man. Paris. 2008

Invader has had solo exhibitions at art galleries in Paris, Osaka, Melbourne, Los Angeles, New York City, London, Rome and Lyon at Galerie de Bellecour (now Michali Gallery, Palm Beach; exhibition for which he created the famous "Rubik Mona Lisa"). He has exhibited works at the 6th Lyon Contemporary Art Biennale (2001), the MAMA Gallery in Rotterdam (2002), the Paris-based Magda Danysz Gallery (2003), the Borusan Center for Culture and Arts in Istanbul, Subliminal Projects in Los Angeles (2004), and Lazarides in London (2011).

In 2010, he was included in the Banksy documentary Exit Through the Gift Shop, filmed by fellow urban artist Thierry Guetta (AKA Mr. Brainwash), whom Invader has claimed is his cousin and it is also commented in Exit Through the Gift Shop that "In 1999 on a family holiday to France a chance discovery sent Thierry's life in a dramatic new direction. [Thierry Guetta:] 'My cousin at that time he was artistic, you know. He was putting mosaic together and trying to do the game of space invaders. Recreating the character, kind of way.'"

In 2011, he took part in "Art in the Streets," a MoCA LA show at the Geffen Contemporary curated by Jeffrey Deitch. His work, when sold in galleries, can fetch six-figure sums.

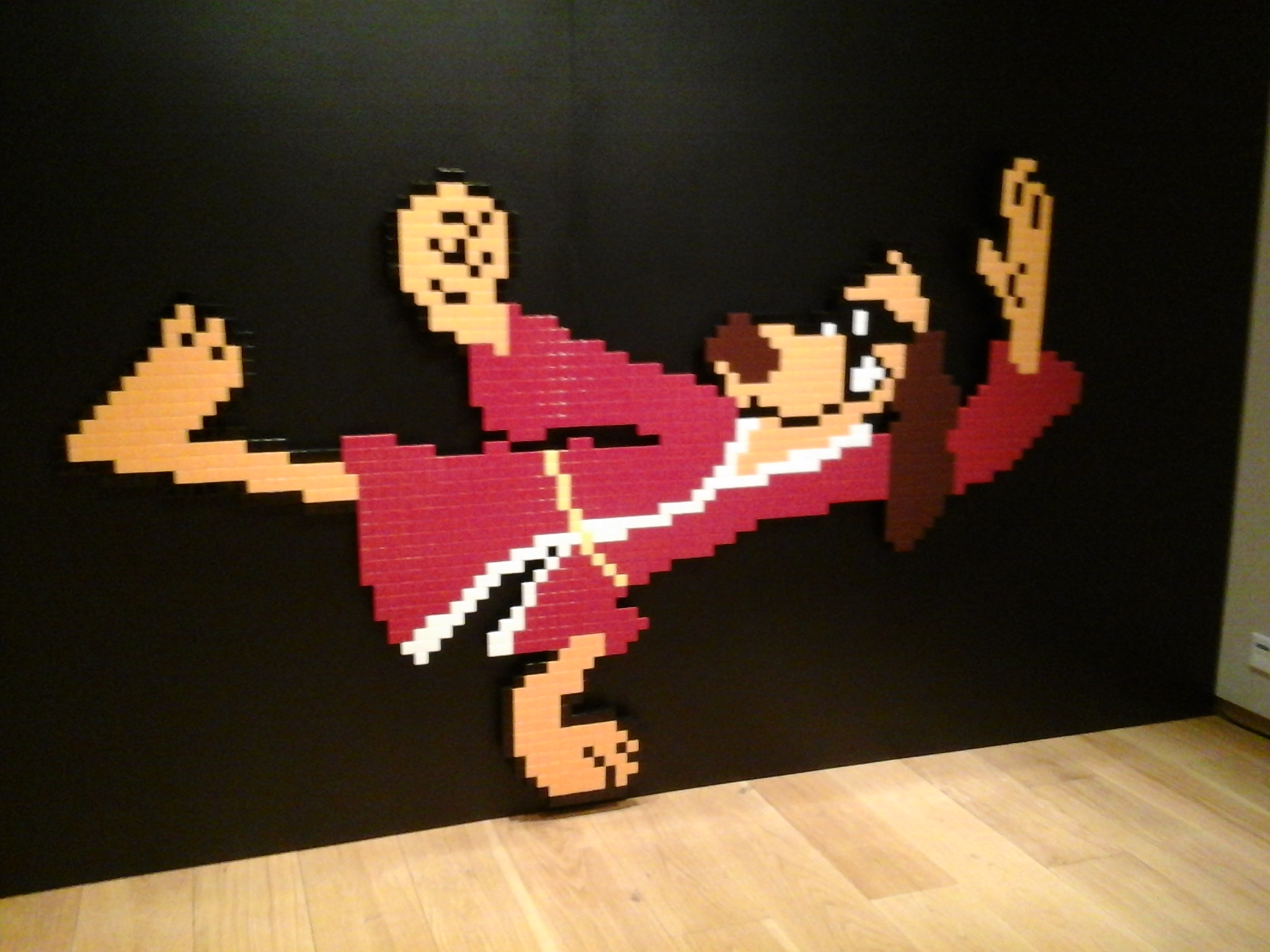
Hong Kong Phooey (HK 58), sold for US$250,000 in early 2015

Fellow street artist Shepard Fairey wrote in Swindle:

Invader's pop art may seem shallow, but by taking the risk of illegally re-contextualizing video game characters in an urban environment that provides more chaotic social interaction than a gamer's bedroom, he makes a statement about the desensitizing nature of video games and consumer culture. In a postmodern paradox, a game like Grand Theft Auto takes the danger of the streets and puts it in a safe video game, while Invader takes a safe video game icon and inserts it into the danger of the streets.

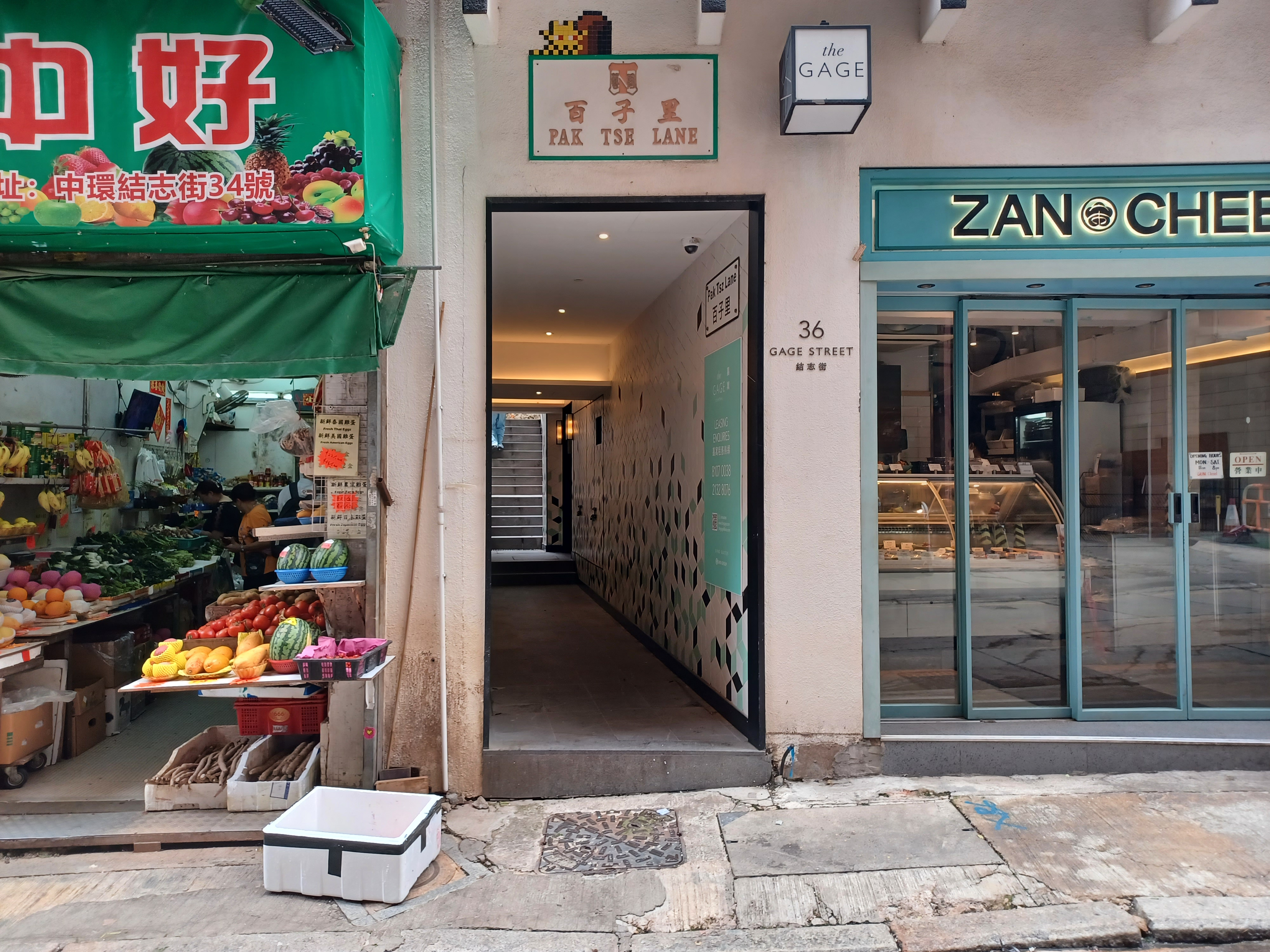
A work on Pak Tsz Lane (百子里), Hong Kong (2023)

During an early 2014 "invasion" in Hong Kong comprising a total of 48 works, the city's Highways Department removed the life-sized Hong Kong Phooey (HK 58) mosaic, which had been placed by the side of a road in Fortress Hill. This angered local residents, who saw the removal as an example of the government only paying lip-service to promoting the arts in the city. In early 2015, a replica of the mosaic reached HK$1.96 million ($250,000) at auction at Sotheby's. NY145, featuring an invader and an old Apple Computer icon, sold for HK$562,500 ($72,000). A solo exhibition of new and retrospective works – called Wipe Out – was held in Hong Kong in May 2015 in association with the Hong Kong Contemporary Art Foundation and Le French May.

In 2017, following an "invasion" in Ravenna, Italy (famed for its ancient mosaics), Invader installed a series of vegetarian-themed works in the "Veggietown" neighborhood of Paris (9th and 10th arr.) as a show of support for vegan restaurants.

In 2022, he glued up an Olympics themed piece to commemorate the occasion.

== Publications ==
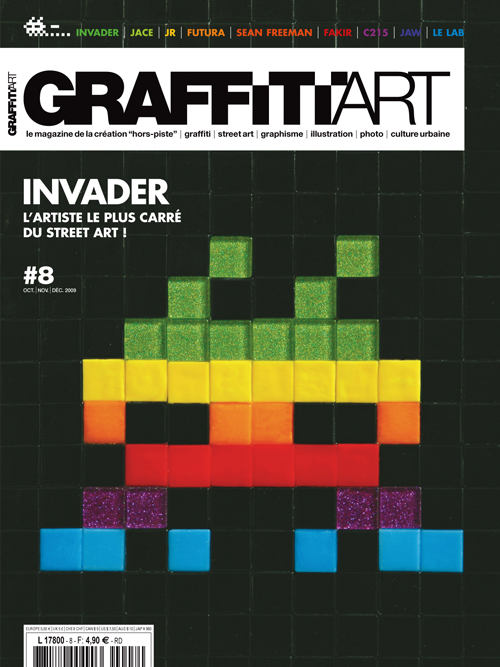
Invader on the cover of Graffiti Art magazine

- L'Invasion de Paris: Livre 01, la Genése. Paris: Invader, 2003. By Invader. ISBN 2-9520199-2-4. With text by Invader in French with English translation.
- Invasion Los Angeles: Invasion Guide 2: Los Angeles / Mission Hollywood. Paris: Invader, 2004. By Invader. ISBN 2-9520199-4-0. With text by Invader in French with English translation. Edition of 2000 copies.
- Invasion in the UK: London, Manchester, Newcastle: Invasion Guide 3. Paris: Invader, 2008. ISBN 978-2952019972. With text by Invader in French with English translation.
- L'Invasion de Paris: 1000. Control P, 2013. ISBN 978-2954125916. 2 Volumes. Text in French and English.
- Mission Miami: Art4Space Project: Invasion Guide 5. Control P, 2013. ISBN 978-2954125923.
- Wipeout in Hong Kong: Invasion Guide 6. Control P, 2015. ISBN 978-9881403186
- Invasion Los Angeles (Control P Editions, 2018), introduction and English translation by Bruno Blum.

== See also ==
- List of street artists
- Tavar Zawacki a.k.a. ABOVE
