= Tavar Zawacki =

American abstract artist

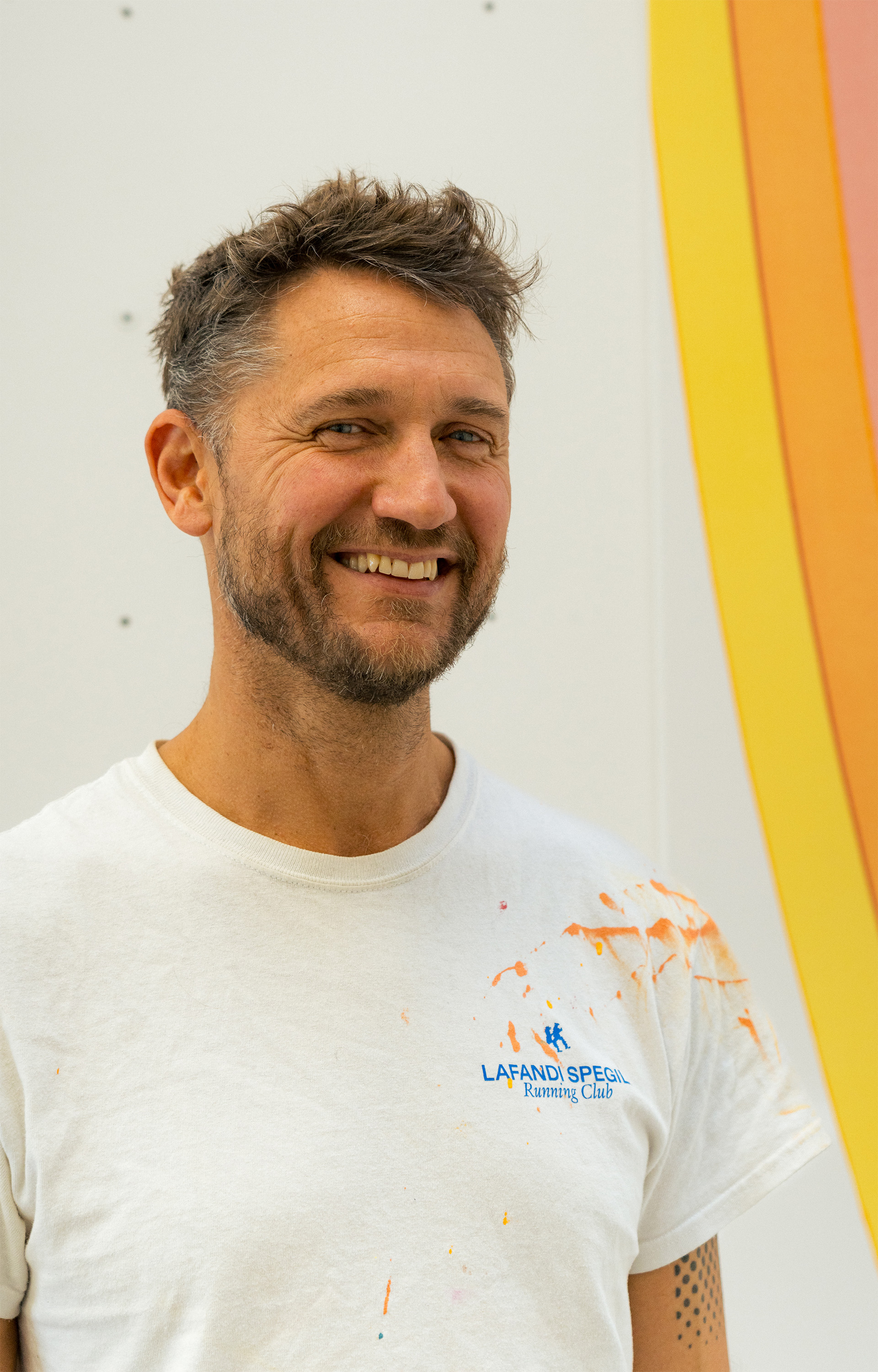
- Tavar Zawacki in his Berlin studio (2025)
- Born: Tavar Zawacki; 1981 (age 44–45); San Francisco, California
- Education: Self-taught
- Known for: Minimalism; Color field Transparency; Abstract Art; Hard-Edge Painting
- Movement: Public art
- Website: tavarzawacki.com

Tavar Zawacki (born 1981, California) is an American abstract artist based in Berlin, Germany. Known for a practice spanning public space and studio painting, Zawacki has spent more than two decades developing a visual language through repeated forms, systematic processes, and a disciplined, process-driven engagement with color and geometry.

Beginning in the late 1990s and working under the pseudonym ABOVE from 1996 to 2016, Zawacki first introduced his arrow motif in Paris in 2001, shortly after relocating from California to Europe at the age of 19. The arrow functioned as a visual extension of the ABOVE name, becoming a recurring device within a wider body of murals and public works realized across more than 45 countries, and reflecting themes of rising above fear, challenge, and limitation in pursuit of personal growth and aspiration.

Since transitioning to studio practice and exhibiting under his birth name, Zawacki has presented more than ten international solo exhibitions and developed a body of work centered on process-driven abstraction, employing geometric forms, color relationships, and transparency through layered and overlapping hues. His work has been associated with Minimalism, Color Field painting, and Hard-Edge painting.

In 2025, he presented Connected, a series of large-scale paintings produced in Berlin that extend these long-standing concerns, structured around a process in which overlapping colors and forms generate a third visual form through interaction.

== Career ==
=== Early career (1995–2000) ===
Tavar Zawacki was born in 1981 in Northern California. He began painting graffiti at the age of fourteen in 1995, working in the traditional letter style under the moniker "ABOVE" on freight trains in California.

In 2000, he shifted from lettering to an arrow symbol pointing upwards, which became his primary visual identifier. According to Zawacki, the change was prompted by an incident where a freight train he had painted with the word "ABOVE" became unreadable as the train moved, leading him to adopt a simpler, more immediate symbol.

=== "ABOVE" arrow period (2000–2006) ===
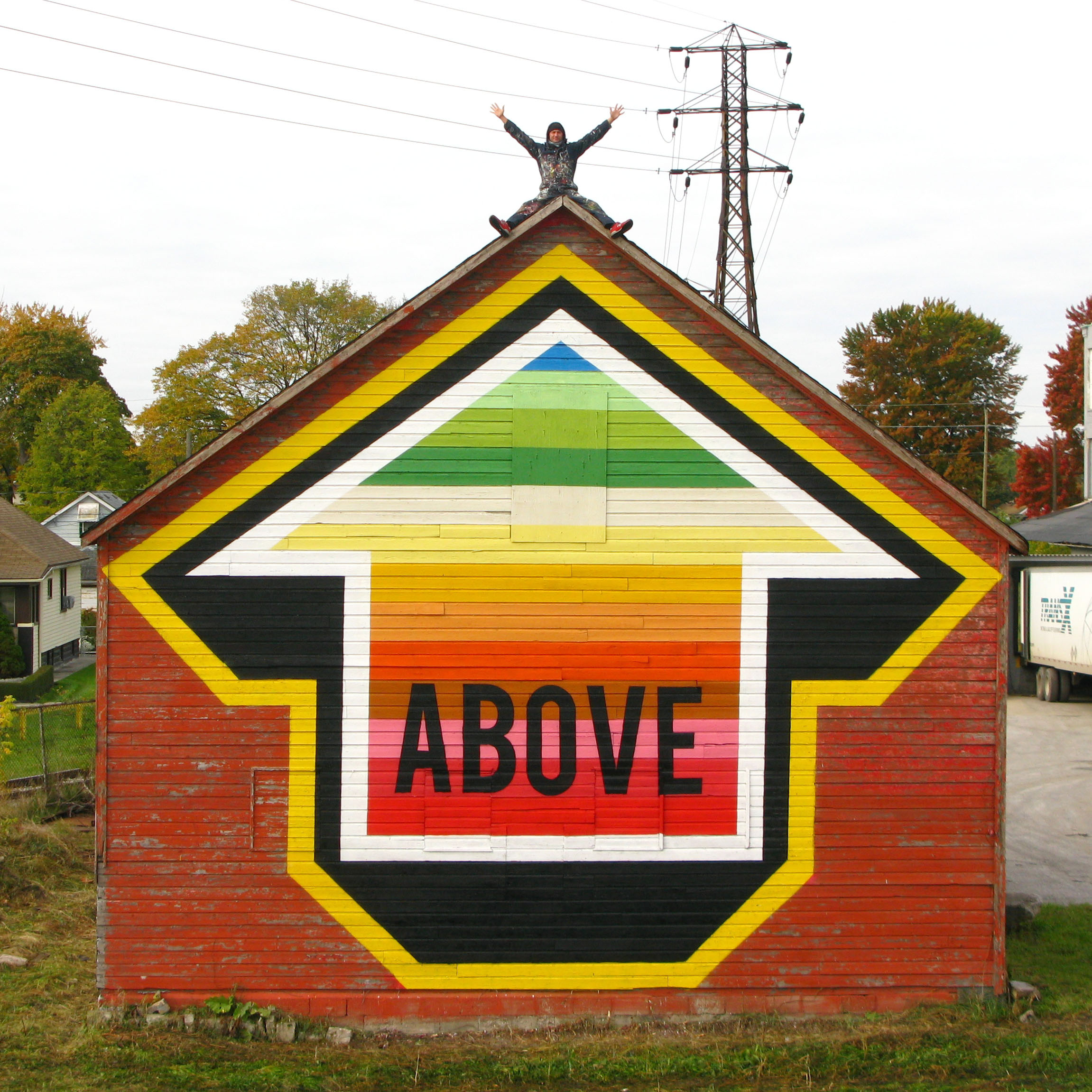
Zawacki sitting atop a large mural of his signature upward-pointing arrow motif (2013). The arrow symbol, introduced in 2000, later became the central visual identifier of his ABOVE period.

Between 2000 and 2006, Zawacki focused his practice on the upward-pointing arrow icon that became his signature motif. His work under the pseudonym ABOVE appeared in more than 100 cities across 50 countries during this period.

In 2000, at the age of 19, he relocated from California to Paris, France, where the street art scene included artists such as Zevs, Invader, Stak, and André. During this time he began painting his arrow logo throughout the city.

After returning to California in 2003, he developed a technique of suspending wooden arrow "mobiles" from overhead wires, a practice he would continue internationally in later years.

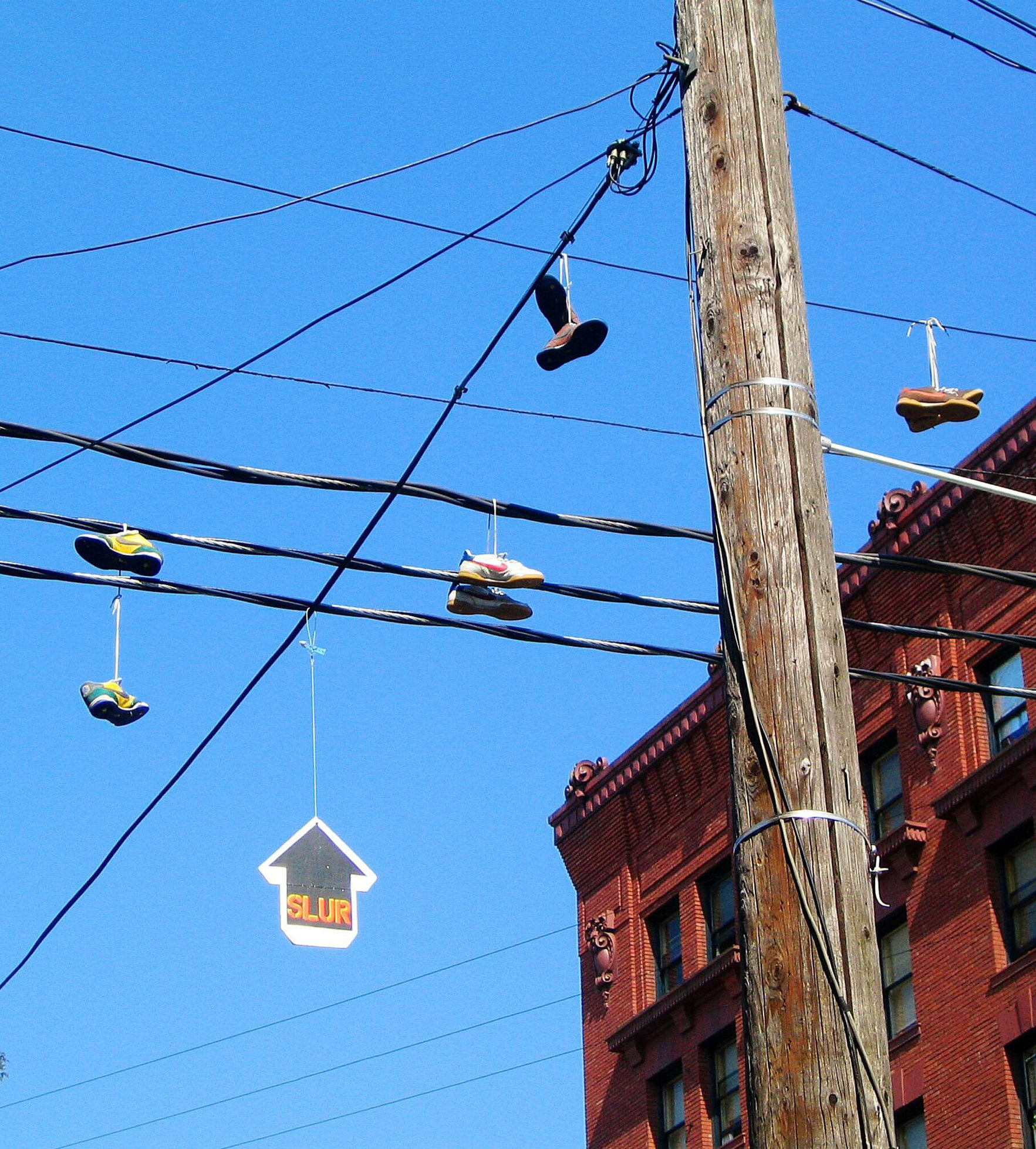
Arrow mobile installed in Seattle during Zawacki’s 2004 U.S.A. Tour, featuring the rotating word-pair “PURE / SLUR.”

In the summer of 2004 he undertook a self-organized "U.S.A. Tour," driving 5,000 miles across the country and installing more than 300 arrow mobiles in 14 cities. Many of these works incorporated wordplay, with different words painted on each side of the arrows to create a rotating dialogue as they spun in the wind.

In 2005, Zawacki returned to Europe and began installing larger wooden arrows affixed to buildings at elevated heights. Over the course of a four-month tour he visited 15 countries and installed approximately 500 works.

In 2006 he organized the "Sign Language Tour," a six-month project across 26 European countries that emphasized wordplay in his arrow mobiles. Each piece featured words painted on both sides in different languages, creating a visual dialogue when rotated by the wind. Examples included French ("J'ai"/"faim"), Spanish ("Hace"/"sol"), German ("über"/"alle"), and Italian ("ciao"/"ciao").

=== South and Central America Tour (2007) ===
In 2007, Zawacki extended the wordplay concepts from his 2006 "Sign Language Tour" to a new project across South and Central America. This tour emphasized larger word-based murals painted on building facades.

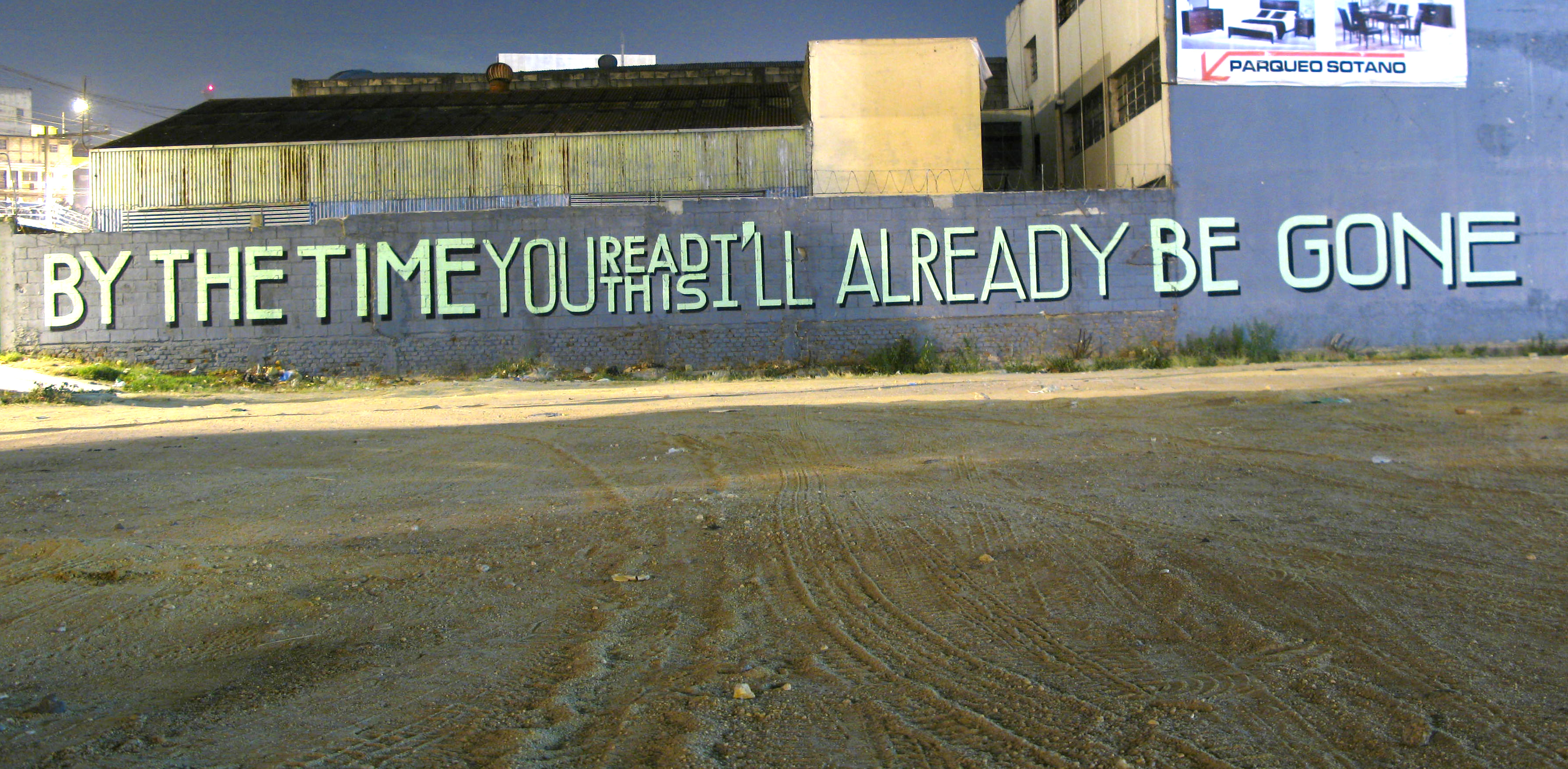
An illegal 'word play' mural painted during Zawacki’s 2007 South & Central America Tour, painted in Guatemala City. 'BY THE TIME YOU READ THIS I'LL ALREADY BE GONE'

He financed the project by working in Alaska for four months prior to departure. The tour lasted six months, beginning in October 2007 in Rio de Janeiro, Brazil, and concluding in May 2008 in Mexico City, Mexico. Over the course of the project, Zawacki produced works in 18 cities across 13 countries.

=== Stencil period (2008–2010) ===
In 2008, while still working under the pseudonym ABOVE, Zawacki shifted his practice from the arrow icon toward site-specific figurative stencil works that addressed social and political themes.

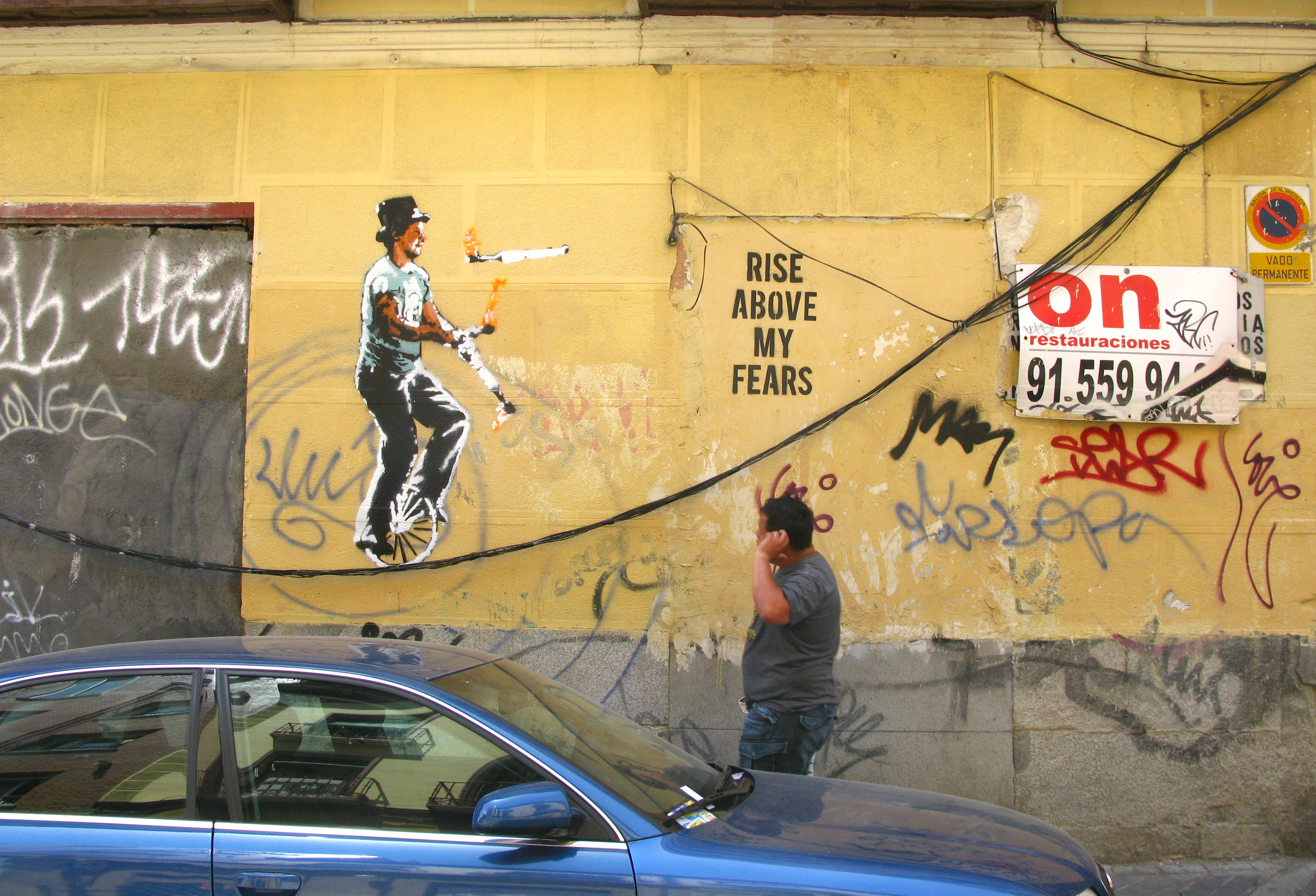
Site-specific stencil created in Madrid (2009), using a sloped electrical wire as a balancing line for a unicyclist juggling fire. 'RISE ABOVE MY FEARS'

In September 2008 he traveled to Lisbon, Portugal, where he produced the stencil "Giving to the Poor," commenting on homelessness by juxtaposing a homeless woman with an ATM machine. In October 2008, following the collapse of the Washington Mutual bank during the Great Recession, he created a stencil of a downward-sloping NYSE bar graph on the building's exterior.

In April 2009 he produced a stencil mural titled "Easter AIGs," depicting children searching for eggs, in response to the AIG bailout controversy. Later that year, during a four-month tour of Europe, he created a site-specific stencil titled "Bridging the Divide" on the Berlin Wall, showing a child reaching for flowers across the divide on the 20th anniversary of German reunification.

In January 2010, shortly after the 2010 Haiti earthquake, he produced the stencil "Help Thy Neighbor" in Havana, Cuba, depicting a boy with a raft, medical kit, and Haitian flag.

In May 2010 Zawacki exhibited with Blek le Rat, a pioneer of stencil graffiti, at White Walls Gallery in San Francisco. Press coverage described the exhibition as a "passing of the torch" between generations of stencil artists.

=== Mainstream media and political works (2011–2012) ===
In October 2011, during the global Occupy Wall Street protests, Zawacki created a 120-foot mural in Miami reading "Give A Wall St. Banker Enough Rope And He Will Hang Himself," accompanied by a hanging effigy of a banker. The work was reported on by NBC News.

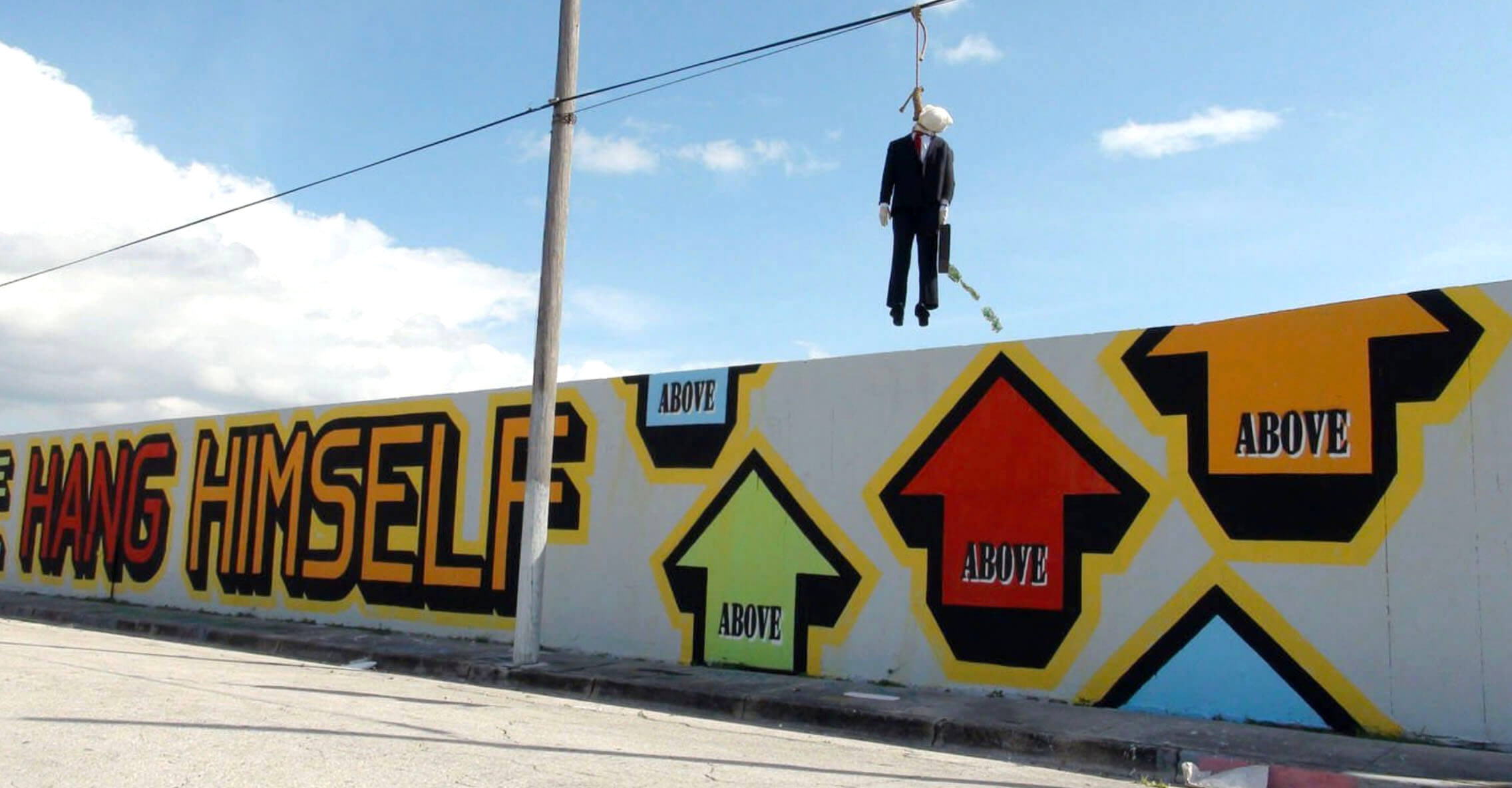
Miami installation from 2011 responding to the Occupy Wall Street movement, where Zawacki paired a 120-foot mural with a suspended banker effigy to complete the statement: “GIVE A WALL ST. BANKER ENOUGH ROPE AND HE WILL HANG HIMSELF.”

In February 2012 he produced a mural in Johannesburg, South Africa, addressing the blood diamond trade. The text read "Diamonds are a woman's best friend and a man's worst enemy," painted across an exterior wall of Jewel City, one of the world's largest diamond exporters. According to media reports, he obtained permission from building owners by initially presenting a less controversial phrase.

In September 2012, during the Eurozone financial crisis, Zawacki painted a 120-foot stencil mural in Zaragoza, Spain, depicting a queue of silhouettes with the phrase "24% Desempleados" ("24% unemployed"). The work referenced Spain's unemployment rate of 24.6 percent at the time, then the highest in the European Union.

Later that month he produced the short film #Socialmedia in Copenhagen, Denmark. The project involved painting a series of text-based statements on a wall, repeatedly covering and repainting them over two days, recorded as a time-lapse film. The messages addressed the role of platforms such as Facebook, Twitter, and Instagram in contemporary culture.

=== Timing Is Everything (2013) ===
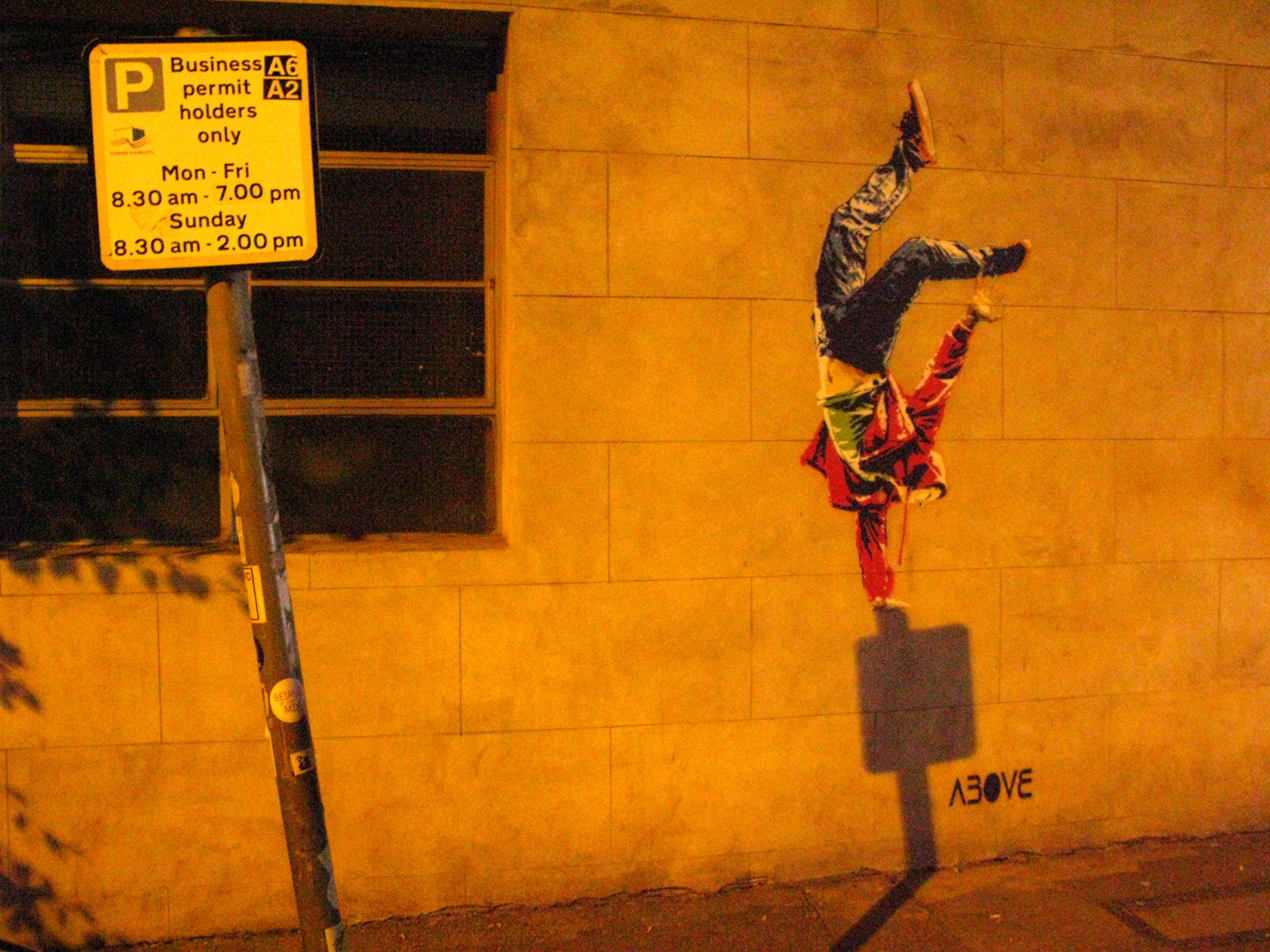
Street stencil Timing Is Everything (2013) in London. At night, the fixed shadow of the street sign aligns with the painted figure, completing the site-specific illusion.

In August 2013, Zawacki produced the stencil work Timing Is Everything in London, England. The piece depicted a breakdancer painted upside down with an arm extended downward. At night the stencil aligned with the shadow of a nearby streetlight pole, creating the illusion of the figure balancing on top of the shadow.

Coverage in the Huffington Post described the piece as a work in which "timing and lighting" were integral to the visual effect, noting its dependence on interaction with the urban environment. Similarly, Mashable reported on the project, emphasizing its use of context and shifting daylight conditions rather than social or political themes.

=== Abstract Arrow period (2014–2016) ===
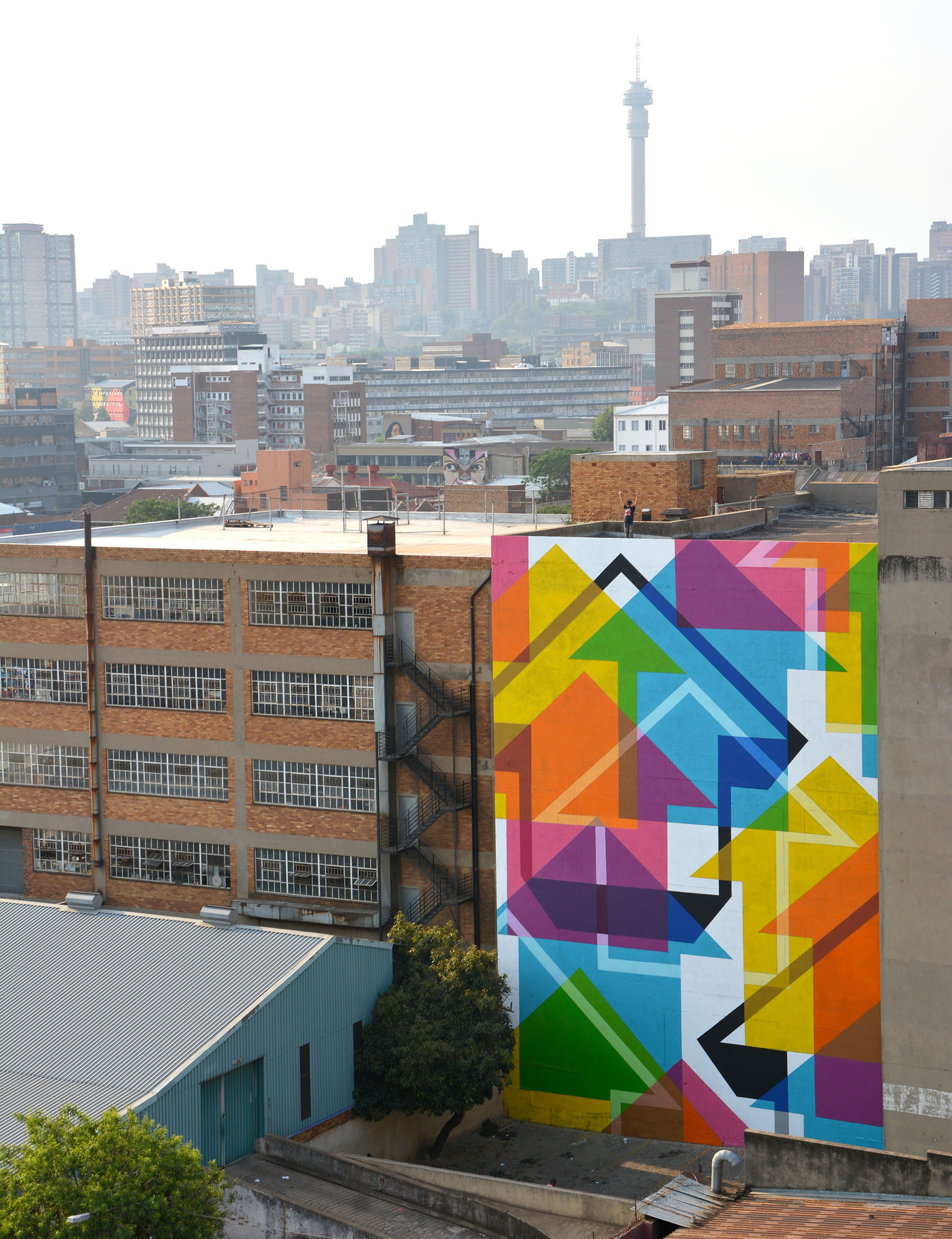
“Incognito” mural painted by Tavar Zawacki in Johannesburg, South Africa in 2015, created during the City of Gold Festival. The 33-meter-tall work layers overlapping arrow forms, generating secondary shapes where the colors intersect.

In June 2014 Zawacki participated in the Artscape mural festival in Malmö, Sweden, where he painted an eight-story mural titled Metamorphosis using a color scheme based on the CMYK color model.

Later that year he held a three-month residency in Detroit, Michigan, in preparation for his solo exhibition Remix at Inner State Gallery. The exhibition featured laser-cut wood panels reconfigured into new compositions, described as an exploration of the balance between curved and linear forms.

In October 2015 Zawacki painted a 33-meter-tall by 17-meter-wide mural titled Incognito in Johannesburg, South Africa, as part of the City of Gold Festival. The work, completed over ten days, layered overlapping arrow forms in varied colors, producing secondary shapes at their intersections.

In March 2016 he presented 12 Months at Galerie SOON in Zürich, Switzerland. The exhibition consisted of works reflecting Zawacki's associations with each month of the year, integrating his arrow motif into varied abstract patterns and color combinations.

That summer Zawacki was artist-in-residence for the Quin Arts program at the Quin Hotel in New York City. Curated by DK Johnston, the exhibition presented 36 mixed-media works in acrylic and resin on wood, marking his first solo show in New York.

=== Metamorphosis (2017) ===
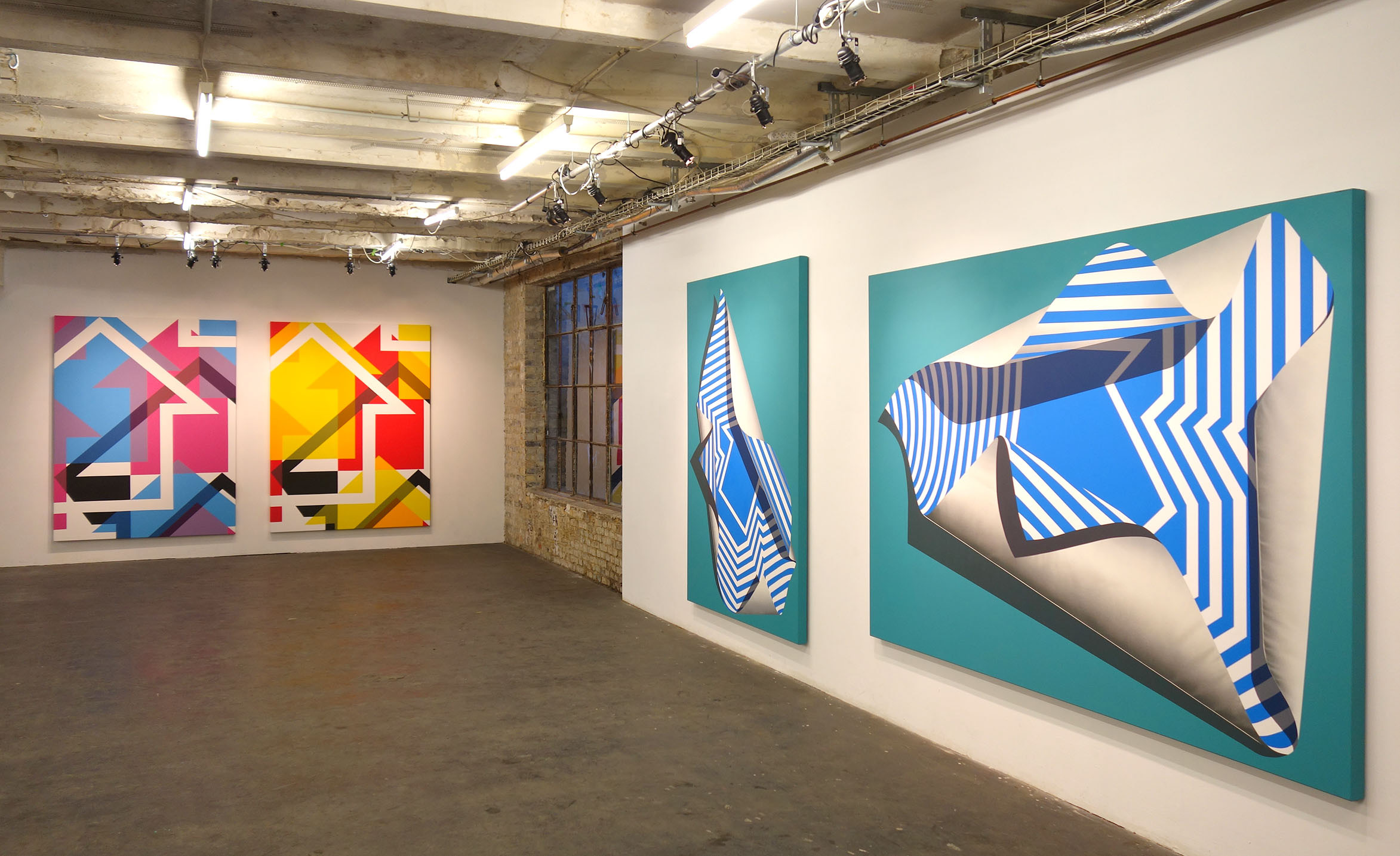
Installation view of Tavar Zawacki’s 2017 exhibition Metamorphosis in Berlin. The show featured large-scale Op art and hard-edge works and was the first time Zawacki exhibited publicly under his real name following two decades working anonymously as ABOVE.

In January 2017 Zawacki ended his anonymity and began creating and signing works under his birth name.

In September 2017 he presented the solo exhibition Metamorphosis at Urban Spree Galerie in Berlin. The exhibition included large-format canvases incorporating Op art, Trompe-l'œil, CMYK, and Hard-edge painting approaches. It marked the first time in his career that he publicly exhibited works signed with his real name.

That same month, his second monograph, also titled Metamorphosis, was published by Urban Spree Books. The 168-page volume surveys his work from the 2014 Remix exhibition in Detroit through the 2017 Berlin show, including outdoor murals and indoor works produced during that period.

=== Shapeshifting (2018) ===
In November 2018 Zawacki presented the solo exhibition Shapeshifting at Wunderkammern gallery in Milan, Italy. The exhibition explored ideas of transformation through varied shapes, color gradients, and trompe-l'œil effects.

Artist Shepard Fairey wrote the exhibition introduction, noting Zawacki's transition from his anonymous ABOVE identity to broader formal experimentation, and described the works as "visually dynamic" and engaged in a "2D/3D dialogue" through layered gradients and trompe-l'œil techniques.

=== Metamorphosis #5 (2019) ===
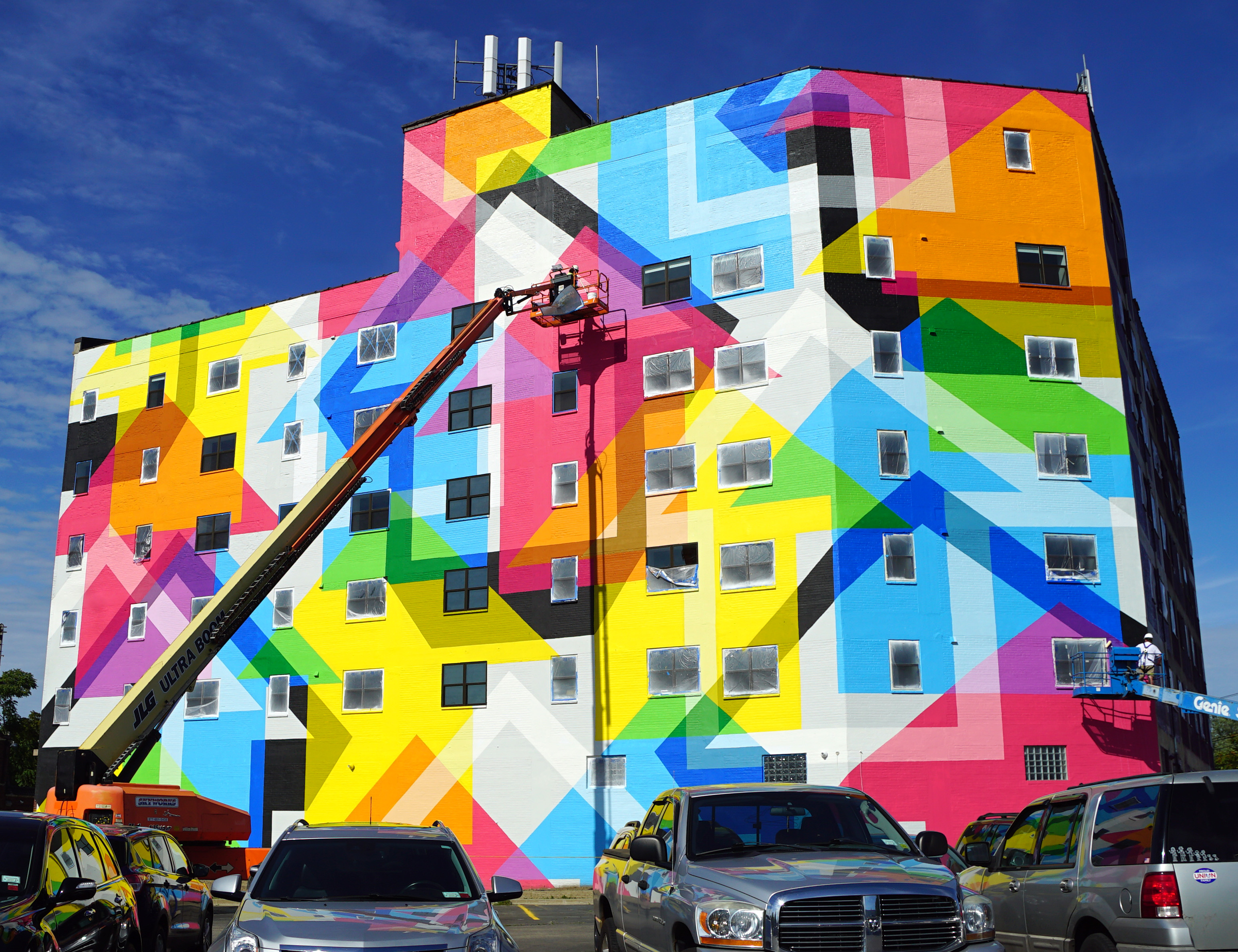
Tavar Zawacki’s 2019 mural *Metamorphosis #5* in Buffalo, commissioned by the Albright–Knox Art Gallery as part of its Public Art Initiative.

In September 2019 Zawacki was commissioned by the Albright–Knox Art Gallery in Buffalo, New York for Metamorphosis #5, the largest mural of his career and part of the museum's ongoing public art initiative. The mural, covering the side of a multi-story building, became the largest public artwork in Buffalo and Western New York.

Aaron Ott, Curator of Public Art at the Albright-Knox, described the project as an expansion of Zawacki's studio practice into a public setting, noting that it conveyed "the kind of energy that you get from the streets but that you can share throughout the world in museum settings, galleries, and here, with public art."

=== Lockdown paintings (2020–2021) ===
In February 2020 Zawacki travelled to Bali, Indonesia, for a planned six-week surf trip. Shortly after his arrival the onset of the COVID-19 pandemic led to global travel restrictions, preventing his return to Berlin. What was intended as a short visit extended into an eighteen-month stay. During this period he decided to let go of his remaining belongings in Berlin and later relocate to Lisbon, Portugal.

While Bali was under lockdown measures, Zawacki established a temporary studio and began working on the Lockdown series between March 2020 and April 2021. He described his routine during that period as painting “an average of 9–10 hours a day alone in my Bali studio,” adding that the works reflected his personal responses to the early months of the pandemic.

=== Papel (2022–2023) ===
After producing the Lockdown paintings in Bali, Zawacki relocated to Lisbon, Portugal. There he developed the Papel series (2022–2023), a body of minimal, hard-edge works based on folded and suspended paper forms. The series was exhibited in 2023 at Rhodes Contemporary Art in London, alongside related public murals. During this time Zawacki continued working without a permanent studio before reestablishing one in Berlin in 2025.

=== Connected (2025) ===
Following the Lockdown paintings (2020–2021), which were produced in Bali during the early months of the COVID-19 pandemic, Zawacki experienced a prolonged period of displacement. Between 2020 and 2025 he moved eighteen times across four countries on three continents without a permanent studio space. He has described this period as one of disconnection from both himself and the people around him, during which he stopped drinking alcohol, adopted daily meditation and breathwork practices, and sought to rebuild stability in his life.

In 2025 he returned to Berlin and established his first permanent studio since 2020. From this context he introduced the series Connected. The works are large-scale abstract paintings characterized by sweeping arcs of translucent color layered across the canvas. The overlapping veils generate secondary and tertiary tones, embodying Zawacki’s principle of "1 + 1 = 3," where the meeting of two elements produces a third outcome.

The series engages with themes of connection and disconnection in contemporary society, referencing both community and the human need for collaboration. Zawacki has described the project as a visual exploration of how relationships between forms—and between people—create something greater than the sum of their parts.

The Connected series is scheduled to debut publicly at Zawacki’s Berlin studio in May 2026.

== Exhibitions ==
=== Selected solo exhibitions ===
- 2023: PAPEL, Rhodes Contemporary Gallery – London, England
- 2021: LOCKDOWN, Virtual Reality Gallery – Bali, Indonesia
- 2019: INCOGNITO STUDIES, Die Kunstagentin Gallery – Cologne, Germany
- 2018: SHAPESHIFTING, Wunderkammern Gallery – Milan, Italy
- 2017: METAMORPHOSIS, Urban Spree Gallery – Berlin, Germany
- 2016: UNTITLED, The Quin – New York City, USA
- 2016: 12 MONTHS, Soon Gallery – Zürich, Switzerland
- 2014: REMIX, Inner State Gallery – Detroit, USA
- 2013: PUSH & PULL, Chez Joe – Paris, France
- 2012: JETSET, Metro Gallery – Melbourne, Australia
- 2011: RISE ABOVE, Art Basel Miami – Miami, USA
- 2011: HERE TODAY, GONE TOMORROW – Lofi Gallery – Sydney, Australia
- 2010: TRANSITIONS, White Walls Gallery – San Francisco, USA

== Personal life ==
Tavar Zawacki lives and works in Berlin, Germany. He was born and raised in northern California and has been skateboarding since he was 13 years old.

== Bibliography ==
- Zawacki, Tavar (2017). Metamorphosis. Berlin: Urban Spree Books. p. 168. ISBN 978-3-9819026-0-0.

Metamorphosis is the second published monograph by Zawacki, and the first under his real name. It covers three years of work, including large-scale outdoor murals and indoor gallery works, and documents his 2017 exhibition Metamorphosis in Berlin.

- Above (2011). Above: Passport. California: Zero+ Publishing. p. 156. ISBN 978-1-937222-03-1.

Above: Passport documents Zawacki's artworks and travels in over 60 countries from 2004 to 2010. The introduction was written by artist Shepard Fairey, who described Above as "extraordinarily driven" and praised his ambition and creativity on the streets of Paris.

=== Books featuring interview/works from Tavar Zawacki ===
In English:

- Søren Solkær, "Surface", Gingko Press, 2015, ISBN 978-1-58423-579-8
- Nicholas Ganz, "Street Messages", Dokument Press, 2015, ISBN 978-9185639731
- Anna Waclawek, Graffiti And Street Art, Thames and Hudson, 2011, ISBN 978-0-500-20407-8
- Christian Hundertmark, The Art of Rebellion 1, Publikat Verlag, 2003, ISBN 978-3-9807478-2-0
- Christian Hundertmark, The Art of Rebellion 2, Publikat Verlag, 2006, ISBN 978-3-9809909-4-3
- Christian Hundertmark, The Art of Rebellion 3, Publikat Verlag, 2010, ISBN 978-3-939566-29-8
- Without Reason, Ilovewr, Without Reason, 2006, ISBN 978-0-646-46066-6
- Markus Mai, Writing: Urban Calligraphy And Beyond, Die Gestalten Verlag, 2003, ISBN 978-3-89955-003-0
- Gary Shove, Untitled, I, Carpet Bombing Publishing 2009 ISBN 0-9559121-0-5
- Gary Shove, Untitled, II, Carpet Bombing Publishing 2010 ISBN 0-340-92059-9
- Gary Shove, Untitled, III, Carpet Bombing Publishing, 2011, ISBN 978-0-9559121-5-3
- Maxime Courtin, Colors Zoo, Colorzoo publishing, 2004, ISBN 978-84-609-0285-0
- Nicholas Ganz, Graffiti World, Thames & Hudson, 2004 ISBN 978-0-500-51170-1
- Tristan Manco, Street Logos, Thames & Hudson, 2004, ISBN 978-0-500-28469-8
- Louis Bou, Street Art: The Spray Files, HarperCollins, 2005 ISBN 978-0-06-083338-1
- Louis Bou, NYC BCN: Street Art Revolution, Collins Design, 2006, ISBN 978-0-06-121004-4
- Izastickup, Bo130, Microbo, TheDon, Drago, 2005, ISBN 978-88-88493-33-6
- Claudia Walde, Sticker City, Thames & Hudson, 2007, ISBN 978-0-500-28668-5
- R. Klanten, M. Huebner, Urban Interventions, Die Gestalten, 2010 ISBN 978-3-89955-291-1

In French:

- Kriss Montfort, Hip art the french touch, éditions Kitchen 93, 2004, (see p. 81) ISBN 2-85980-002-6
- Collectif, Une Nuit, éditions Kitchen 93, 2007, (see p. 72) ISBN 2-85980-007-7
- Fabienne Grevy, Paris Graffiti, Editions de la Martiniere, 2008, ISBN 978-2-7324-3731-6

In Italian:

- Duccio Dogheria, Street Art (Storia e Controstoria Techniche e Protagonisti), Giunti, 2015, ISBN 978-8-80981-142-3
