= Jaimie D'Cruz =

British documentary film producer and director

Jaimie D'Cruz is a British documentary film producer and director.

D'Cruz started as a music journalist, and founded the hip hop magazine TOUCH, which he edited between 1990 and 1998. In 1998, he began to make TV documentaries for the British television station Channel 4.

His first documentary film not made for TV was Exit Through the Gift Shop, directed by Banksy and co-produced by D'Cruz with Holly Cushing and James Gay-Rees.

In 2011, he co-founded alongside Francesca Newby an independent production company called "Acme Films" which specializes in producing films related to popular contemporary culture.

== Filmography ==
Director

- 2009: Chickens, Hugh and Tesco Too (TV documentary)
- 2011: The Antics Roadshow (TV documentary)
- 2016: Lawful Killing (feature-length documentary)

Producer

- 2008: Hugh's Chicken Run (TV series documentary) (series producer)
- 2008: River Cottage Spring (TV series documentary) (3 episodes)
- 2010: Exit Through the Gift Shop (documentary)
- 2011: The Antics Roadshow (TV documentary)

Executive producer

- 2011: Life of Rhyme (TV documentary)

== Awards and nominations ==
- 2011: Nominated for "Best Documentary, Features" for the documentary film Exit Through the Gift Shop (nomination shared with Banksy)
- 2011: Nominated for "Outstanding Debut by a British Writer, Director or Producer" for the same film at the BAFTA Awards in 2010 (nomination shared with Banksy)
