= NetSol Technologies =

Asset finance and automotive retail software company

NetSol Technologies Inc.
- Type: Public
- Traded as: Nasdaq: NTWK; PSX: NETSOL
- Industry: Software
- Founded: 1997; 29 years ago
- Founder: Najeeb Ghauri; Salim Ghauri
- Headquarters: Encino, California, U.S.
- Products: Asset finance and automotive retail software
- Website: netsoltech.com

NetSol Technologies Inc. is an American software company which makes asset finance and automotive digital retail software. It is based in Encino, California.

NetSol is listed on NASDAQ and its subsidiary NetSol Pakistan is listed on the Pakistan Stock Exchange. As of fiscal year ended June 30, 2025, the company had approximately 1,460 employees.

== History ==
NetSol Technologies was founded as Network Solutions in 1996 by Najeeb Ghauri, a Pakistani-born American executive with a background in corporate sector, and Salim Ghauri who worked as an IT consultant in Australia.

NetSol was listed on NASDAQ in 1999. It is also listed on the Pakistan Stock Exchange.

As of 2006, DaimlerChrysler implemented LeaseSoft in its auto-leasing and financing operations across eight Asian countries, while Toyota utilized the software in Thailand and China.

== Products and services ==
- NetSol LeaseSoft
- NetSol Financial Suite
