= Mr. Brainwash =

Los Angeles-based street artist born in France (born 1966)

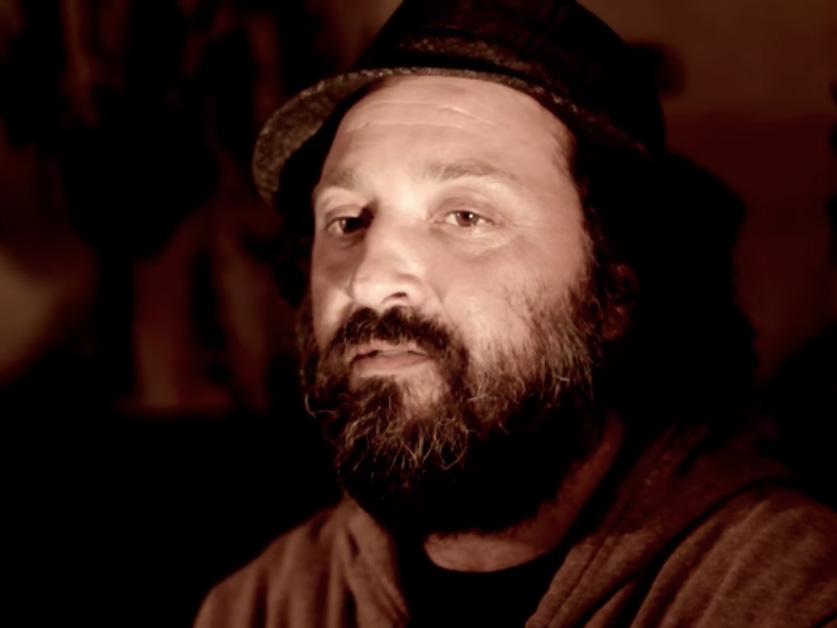
- Thierry Guetta in 2012
- Born: Thierry Guetta; January 31, 1966 (age 60); Garges-lès-Gonesse, France
- Known for: Photoshopping; Printmaker; Street art Social commentary
- Notable work: Exit Through The Gift Shop
- Movement: Pop art
- Website: mrbrainwash.com

Thierry Guetta (born January 31, 1966), best known by his moniker Mr. Brainwash, is a French-born Los Angeles–based street artist. He is also of Tunisian Jewish ancestry. According to the 2010 Banksy-directed film Exit Through the Gift Shop, Guetta was a proprietor of a used clothing store, and amateur videographer who was first introduced to street art by his cousin, the street artist Invader, in 1999 and who filmed street artists such as Shephard Fairey through the 2000s and became an artist in his own right in a matter of weeks after an off-hand suggestion from Banksy.

A number of critics have observed that his works strongly emulate the styles and concepts of Banksy, and have speculated that Guetta is an elaborate prank staged by Banksy, who may have created the works himself. Banksy insists on his official website, however, that Exit Through the Gift Shop is authentic and that Guetta is not part of a prank.

His work sold for five-figure sums at his self-financed debut exhibit Life Is Beautiful, due, it is thought, to a mixture of an overheated and hyped street art market and his endorsements from Banksy and Fairey. The exhibit was held in Los Angeles, California, on June 18, 2008, and was a popular success. In 2009, Madonna paid Guetta to design the cover art for her Celebration album.

In October 2013, Guetta took part in Art Wars at the Saatchi Gallery curated by Ben Moore. Guetta was issued with a stormtrooper helmet, which he transformed into a work of art. Proceeds went to the Missing Tom Fund set up by Ben Moore to find his brother Tom who has been missing for over ten years. The work was also shown on the Regents Park platform as part of Art Below Regents Park.

== Art and exhibitions ==
=== Life Is Beautiful ===
Mr. Brainwash's first solo show, Life Is Beautiful, opened in the summer of 2008, in a former T.V. studio in Hollywood. The show garnered the cover of LA Weekly, one of Los Angeles' most circulated publications. Life Is Beautiful attracted thousands of people who lined the streets for blocks. Featuring a 20-foot robot, a pyramid made of 20,000 books and a life-size recreation of Edward Hopper's "Nighthawks," Life Is Beautiful's exhibition time extended to three months, attracting a total of 50,000 visitors.

=== Life Is Beautiful: Icons ===
On February 14, 2010, Guetta opened his second show in New York City. The show Life Is Beautiful: Icons covered 15,000 square feet (1,400 m^{2}) of an abandoned warehouse in the Meat Packing District to create a gallery. According to Anthony Haden-Guest, a portrait of Jim Morrison made of broken vinyl records in a simplistic version of the style of mosaicist Ed Chapman was sold for $100,000. Massive cans were created for the show, ranging in size from 4 ft (1.2 m) to 12 ft (3.7 m) and are now embodied as prints in a series.

=== Opera Gallery London ===
On October 6, 2011, Guetta opened a solo exhibition at Opera Gallery in London. The previous night the street outside the gallery was sprayed with paint by RSH as a statement about the false nature of Mr. Brainwash's artwork.

=== Toronto Film Festival ===
Mr. Brainwash made his Canadian debut at the Toronto International Film Festival in 2011, by placing installations all over the city. They included his signature 8-foot tall spray can sculptures, each one a different film genre, and lifesize Canadian Mounties cutouts, armed with boom mics and cameras. MBW will be participating in multiple events and a collaboration about the festival exhibit with Grace Kelly.

=== 2012 Olympic Games in London ===
In 2012, during the Summer Olympics in London, Mr Brainwash made his second show in the UK in the Old Sorting Office, a colossal space in London's West End. Works include a 6-story tall Queen Elizabeth II, in her coronation attire, holding a Union Jack spray can, "God Save the People," a giant bucket of beans, a 20 ft. tall gorilla, a 20 ft tall Kate Moss on the front of the building, the Olympic rings in paint buckets, and a life-size taxi cab in a matchbox. David Guetta played the opening.

=== Art Basel ===
At Art Basel in Miami, in 2010, without any announcement or notice, Mr. Brainwash took over a 25,000 square foot building in South Beach with a colorful art spectacle entitled, "Life Is Beautiful: Under Construction."

In 2011, Mr. Brainwash headed back to Miami for Art Basel with a new show, Life Is Beautiful: Untitled. Occupying the same South Beach space, he constructed fiberglass sculptures and mixed media canvases.

Mr. Brainwash returned to Art Basel in 2013, taking up residency in Gale South Beach on Collins Avenue. This show included large scale oil paintings and sculpture, including a 3-story-tall Mona Lisa with a mohawk.

=== Life Is Beautiful: Art Show 2011 ===
Taking over an 80,000 square foot building in the center of the city, Mr. Brainwash also gave artists the opportunity to be a part of this show. For the exhibition, he donated over 20,000 square feet of space to showcase donated works from around the globe. Google chose this space to unveil their Google Music platform on November 11, 2011. The event featured performances by Busta Rhymes, Drake, and Maroon 5.

=== September 11 Mural, 2014 ===
Mr. Brainwash created a huge mural in honor of 9/11, which was located on the side of Century 21 (on Church between Dey Street and Cortlandt Street) across from the WTC site.

=== September 11 Mural, 2015 ===
In 2015, Mr. Brainwash returned to New York City to create another mural in remembrance of September 11. The 65-by-225-foot mural on the wall of the Century 21 department store in Lower Manhattan commemorates those affected by the terrorist attacks of September 11, 2001.

== Music collaborations ==
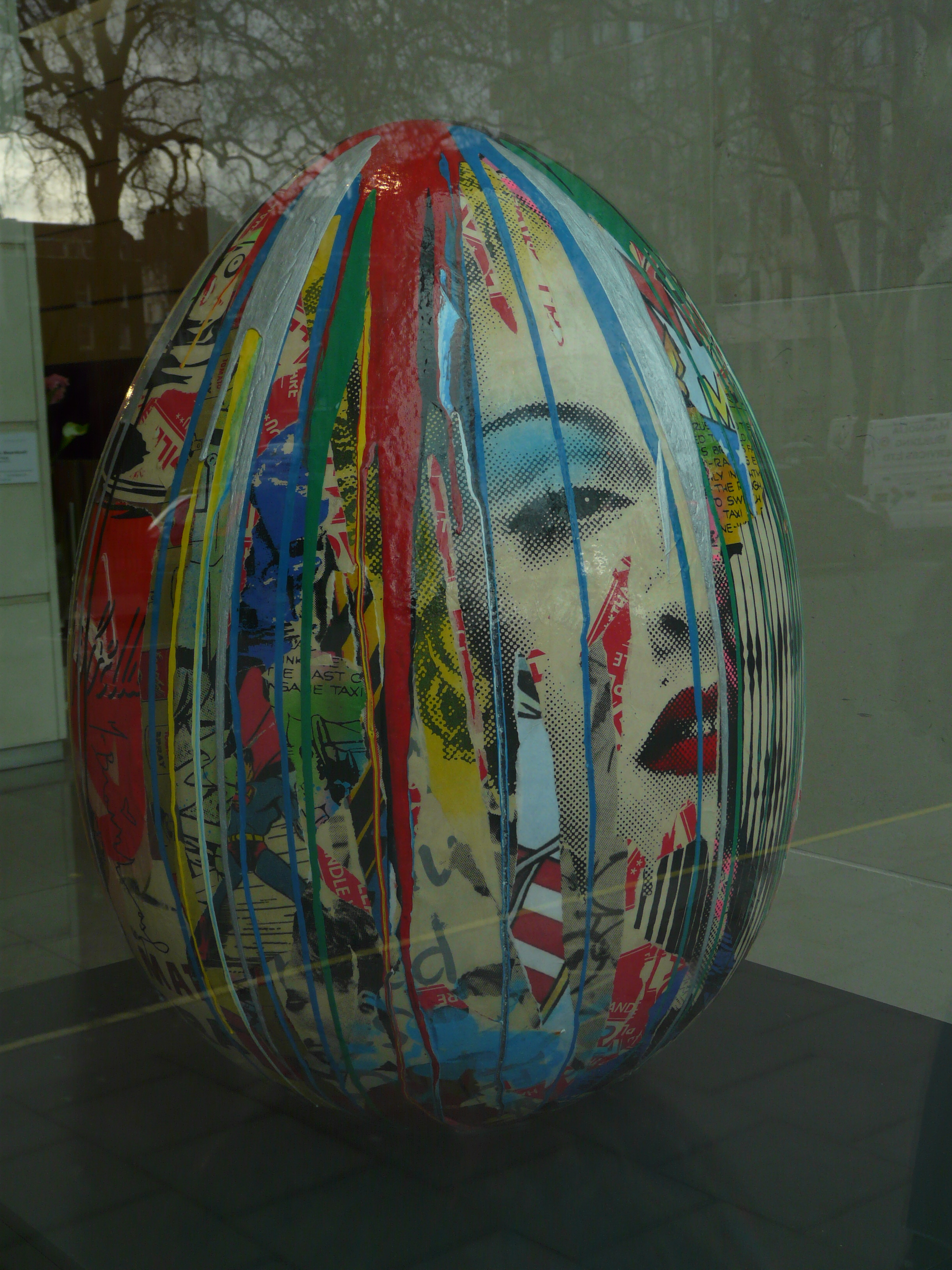
Artwork "Life is Beautiful" by Mr. Brainwash

In 2009, when Madonna was set to release her greatest hits compilation, Celebration, she asked Mr. Brainwash to design the cover. He designed 15 different covers for the wide release, singles, DVDs and special edition vinyl. Mr. Brainwash also collaborated with Madonna for her Hard Candy Fitness in Toronto. The Hard Candy Fitness opening featured the live onsite creation of an 11 by 30 foot Madonna mural, designed by Mr. Brainwash.

For the National Election, Mr. Brainwash designed key art for "Rock the Vote", a national campaign reminding the youth about the importance of voting and the power of democracy.

Brainwash designed artwork for Michael Jackson's "Xscape". Michael Jackson was a longtime friend of Thierry's and was one of the first people to purchase art from him. Mr. Brainwash also designed a digital cover to commemorate this posthumous release.

In early June 2011, cryptic artwork of a robot and the Red Hot Chili Peppers logo with the date 8/30/11 was posted around Los Angeles. The band's management denied that the works were connected with the band; however on July 14, 2011, TMZ reported that the artwork was by Mr. Brainwash and part of the official promotion for the Chili Peppers' I'm with You album.

Mr. Brainwash directed a video for "Divine Sorrow" by Wyclef Jean, featuring Avicii for Coca-Cola and the (RED) campaign, which aims to raise awareness and money for the Global Fund's efforts to virtually eliminate mother to child transmission of HIV.

In 2013, in collaboration with the Hard Rock Hotel, Mr. Brainwash did art installations for the Coachella Festival.

In 2014, Mr Brainwash was a part of Rita Ora's live musical performances on The Tonight Show with Jimmy Fallon.

Mr. Brainwash collaborated with Mercedes-Benz for The Evolution Tour, eight intimate concert experiences, across the country featuring artists such as Alabama Shakes and Mayer Hawthorne. At each stop of the Evolution Tour, Mr. Brainwash created a one-of-a-kind Mercedes-Benz 2015 GLA.

== Fashion collaborations ==
In December 2014, Mr. Brainwash created an installation for the opening of Hublot's Bal Harbor Boutique in Miami during Miami Art Week, wrapping the entire facade with his work but also intervening on presentation stands inside the boutique and even creating a one-of-a-kind Hublot timepiece with a presentation box.

In the spring of 2015, Mr. Brainwash helped launch Sunglass Hut's Signature Artists Series with a limited edition, one-of-a-kind run of Aviator and Wayfarer sunglasses by Ray Ban.

== Publicity and sales ==
=== At commercial auction ===
Mr Brainwash made his major auction debut on May 14, 2010, at Phillips. The piece, a massive canvas, was given a pre-auction estimate of $50,000–70,000. It showed a Charlie Chaplin character with paint can and roller in hand. The background of the work was adorned with the artist's Madonna and Heart image, set in an urban/street environment.

The London Fall 2010 Phillips Contemporary Art Sale was Brainwash's second appearance in auction, this time with two works, described as spray and metallic paint, acrylic and paper collage on canvas. The smaller of the two measures 106.7 x 106.7 cm (42 x 42 inches) and shows Kate Moss amongst heavy brush strokes and splatters of red, pink, and white paint all amongst a gold background. The larger one, measuring 162.6 x 121.9 cm (64 x 48 inches), shows Albert Einstein in front of a graffiti adorned wall. The works sold for about $67,000 and $120,000, almost three times their estimates.

=== Copyright infringement lawsuit ===
Guetta has been sued by Glen E. Friedman over Guetta's use of his photo of rap group Run DMC.

=== A Day in the Life ===
An episode of the Morgan Spurlock-produced documentary series A Day in the Life follows Guetta for a day. He is shown preparing for a large Los Angeles show. In the episode he reveals that all of his work since his 2008 debut has been completed with a team of graphic designers.

== Speculation and theories ==
There has been speculation that the film and story of Mr. Brainwash are a hoax concocted by Banksy and Shepard Fairey.

The Times noted that "The blogs buzzed with rumours: that Mr Brainwash is nothing but a front for Banksy; even that he is Banksy." Fast Company concludes that "The whole thing, it's clear now, was an intricate prank being pulled on all of us by Banksy, who has never publicly revealed his identity, with Fairey as his accomplice. ... [His work] looks like Banksy trying not to look like Banksy..."

Some suggest that Fairey and Banksy have been artificially inflating the sales of Mr. Brainwash's work. According to Rebecca Cannon, Mr. Brainwash's work hasn't sold as well on independent forums:

With both shows held outside of commercial galleries, no professional dealers have had their reputation on the line in making fake claims of high sales. However, if Guetta is a hoax, there also exists the possibility that these artworks are actually produced by Banksy himself, in a style deliberately intended to suggest inferior artistic skill.

As Exit Through the Gift Shop opened in North America, in April 2010, The Boston Globe movie reviewer Ty Burr found it to be quite entertaining as a farce and awarded it four stars. He dismissed the notion of the film being a "put on" saying "I’m not buying it; for one thing, this story’s too good, too weirdly rich, to be made up. For another, the movie’s gently amused scorn lands on everyone."

The artshow "Life Is Beautiful" depicted in the movie did occur, which implies that if this is a hoax the character of Thierry Guetta has existed since at least June 2008. A trailer for his movie, Life Remote Control, has been on YouTube since 2006. This suggests that, at the very least, genuine details of Guetta's life have been woven into the narrative.

An LA Times investigation found "[the] details of Guetta's unlikely biography are broadly supported by a review of public records, which trace his life in Los Angeles from his arrival as a teenager in the early 1980s. They are also consistent with the accounts of friends, former business associates and employees over those years." Friends the Times interviewed confirmed the film's story that Guetta was constantly filming and several notarized documents prove that he hired someone to assist with the construction of his film Life Remote Control.

However, it also adds that "it is impossible to prove whether his latest incarnation, Mr. Brainwash, is sincere. The film suggests that Guetta's artistic alter ego is largely a creation of Banksy, a notion Guetta doesn't refute." Guetta told the paper: "In the end, I became [Banksy's] biggest work of art."
