= Next =

Next may refer to:

== Arts and entertainment ==
=== Film ===
- Next (1990 film), an animated short about William Shakespeare
- Next (2007 film), a sci-fi film starring Nicolas Cage
- Next: A Primer on Urban Painting, a 2005 documentary film

=== Literature ===
- Next (Crichton novel), a novel by Michael Crichton
- Next (Hynes novel), a 2010 novel by James Hynes
- Next (play), a play by Terrence McNally
- Next: The Future Just Happened, a 2001 non-fiction book by Michael Lewis

=== Music ===
==== Performers ====
- Next (American group), an R&B trio
- NEXT (Korean band), a South Korean rock band
- Next (Chinese group), a boy group

==== Albums ====
- Next (ATB album), 2017
- Next (Journey album) or the title song, 1977
- Next (The Necks album) or the title instrumental, 1990
- Next (The Sensational Alex Harvey Band album) or the title song (see below), 1973
- Next (Sevendust album), 2005
- Next (Soulive album), 2002
- Next (Vanessa Williams album), 1997
- Next! or the title song, by Seeed, 2005
- Next, by 7th Heaven, 2015

==== Songs ====
- "Next" (Ivy Queen song), 2020
- "Next" (Sevyn Streeter song), 2017
- "Next" (YoungBoy Never Broke Again song), 2023
- "Next", by Béla Fleck and the Flecktones from Little Worlds
- "Next", by the Justified Ancients of Mu Mu from 1987 (What the Fuck Is Going On?)
- "Next", by Lil Pump
- "Next", by Raven-Symoné from Raven-Symoné
- "Next", by Ufo361
- "Next", by The Weeknd from Echoes of Silence
- "Au suivant", by Jacques Brel from Les Bonbons, 1966; recorded in an English-language version as "Next" by Scott Walker and the Sensational Alex Harvey Band

=== Television shows and episodes ===
- Next! (TV series), a 2002 American sketch comedy series
- Next (game show), a dating show on MTV
- Next (2020 TV series), a drama series on Fox
- "Next" (Desperate Housewives), an episode
- The Next: Fame Is at Your Doorstep, a 2012 American reality series
- "Next" (The Bear), a 2024 episode of The Bear TV series

=== Other media ===
- "Next", a 2018 update for the video game No Man's Sky

== Mass media ==
=== Print media ===
- Next (Nigeria), a newspaper
- Next Magazine (Santa Monica), a music industry trade publication
- Next Media, a publishing company in Hong Kong, China

=== Radio ===
- Next, a regional radio news show produced by the New England News Collaborative and WNPR
- Radio Next, a defunct Bangladeshi radio station

== Brands and enterprises ==
- Next (bicycle company)
- Next (cigarettes)
- Next (Indian retailer)
- Next (restaurant)
- NeXT, a 1980s computer company later bought by Apple Computer
- Next Management, a modeling agency
- Next plc, a British clothing retailer

== Education ==
- National Exit Test, an exit exam for MBBS students in India

== Science and technology ==
- NEXT (ion thruster), an ion thruster developed at NASA Glenn Research Center
- NExT, a mission of the Stardust space probe
- New X-ray Telescope or NeXT, a Japanese hard X-ray observatory
- Project NExT, a professional development program for mathematicians
- Yahoo! Next, a former showcase for Yahoo! projects
- Next.js, a web development framework
- Near-end crosstalk, crosstalk closest to the interfering device

== Transport ==
- Project NEXT, a proposed public transport payment system for New Zealand
- Stadler NExT, a Swiss commuter train

== See also ==
- NXT (disambiguation)
- NEX (disambiguation)
