= Next: A Primer on Urban Painting =

- Directed by: Pablo Aravena
- Written by: Pablo Aravena
- Produced by: Pablo Aravena
- Release date: October 21, 2005
- Language: English

Next: A Primer on Urban Painting is a 2005 documentary film from Canadian filmmaker Pablo Aravena, exploring graffiti around the world. The film was co-produced with French fashion designer Agnès B. Sequences were shot in the United States, Canada, France, the Netherlands, Germany, England, Spain, Japan and Brazil.
