= Flying Copper =

2003 portrait by Banksy

Flying Copper is a 2003 portrait of a British policeman by British artist, Banksy. The portrait is of a winged and heavily armed policeman with a yellow smiley replacing his face.

The piece was first shown on cardboard that was suspended from the ceiling at the Turf War exhibition in the East End of London in 2003. Screenprints were released in 2003 with two different background colours; blue and pink. The edition totals 150 signed prints, 600 unsigned prints as well 8 artist's proofs with pink faces and 63 artist's proofs with pink backgrounds.

== See also ==
- List of works by Banksy
