= Show Me the Monet (painting) =

2005 oil-on-canvas painting by Banksy

- Artist: Banksy
- Year: 2005
- Medium: Oil painting on canvas
- Subject: Consumerism, capitalism and pollution
- Dimensions: 143 cm × 143 cm (56 in × 56 in)
- Location: Privately owned

Show me the Monet is a 2005 oil-on-canvas painting by graffiti artist Banksy, which depicts a traffic cone and abandoned shopping carts in a scene that evokes the Japanese bridge paintings by Claude Monet. It is part of a series of paintings by Banksy called Crude Oil. It sold at Sotheby's in October 2020 for £7.5 million.

== Analysis ==
Show Me the Monet is a part of the series and exhibition Crude Oils, a rare segment of Banksy's body of work, as the canvas is entirely hand painted by him. The work was created during a period when Banksy had to remain indoors, in which he began oil painting, then adding his traditional environmental disruption learnt through his pre-existing practice of graffiti. The work cemented his importance as a controversial and socio-political commentator and satirist.

Show Me the Monet is an appropriation or vandalization of Claude Monet's Water Lilies series, specifically his series of twelve paintings that depict a Japanese footbridge over a water lily pond. Banksy chose to scale up the painting (143 x 143cm) compared to Monet's smaller compositions. The composition and colouring of the painting is believed to be an amalgamation of three of Monet's water lily paintings: Le Bassin Aux Nymphéas, Water Lilies and Japanese Bridge and The Water-Lily Pond.

Banksy has appropriated the image into a waste-site, adding in two shopping carts and an orange traffic cone half submerged into the water. Through the addition of these objects, he reimagines the original painting to convey the impact of consumption and consumerism on the natural environment, and the sacrifices taken to maintain and advance humans' lifestyles. The iconic image of Monet's Water Lilies is a strategic choice. This is one of Monet's most universally recognisable series of paintings and exists within the peak of artistic achievement within the last 100 years of art history. It is a quintessential image within the western canon. Through the selective use and repurposing of Monet's Water Lilies, Banksy tackles and criticises one of the perceived heights of human civilisation.

Banksy strategically chose shopping carts to subvert Monet's original image. The shopping cart has evolved from the centrepiece of shopping into a representation of subculture. It now symbolises the height of consumer culture and a way of life under anglophone capitalism. Either full or abandoned, it symbolises consumerism. Through the disruption of the tranquil environment by the contrasting shopping carts Banksy directly challenges a throw-away wasteful society driven by capitalist greed and corporate business.

There is an initial surface level criticism of laziness evoking imagery of consumers who have discarded their shopping carts on land strips or other natural areas such as green spaces or lakes. The laziness depicted within the work can be understood as a symptomatic result of consumption and consumerism in which a lack of personal responsibility prevails. The statement of the shopping cart in the river reads to a much larger ongoing criticism within Banksy’s artworks. Show Me the Monet presents a tipping point within society. Disrupted is the idyllic state Monet originally depicted. Now unsettled by waste the work communicates the destruction of Earth as shopping mania prevails.

The title employs a double entendre; Banksy has changed the sentence "show me the money" to reference the artist whose work he is appropriating. The reference could be interpreted as a critique of the traditional gallery institution, and its wealth and elitism. "Show me the money" is often said in movies and television, notably in the 1996 film Jerry Maguire. The slogan has now become synonymous with a capitalist society driven by fast earnings through any means. The painting's title suggests the problematic commodification of artworks, and that high claimed artworks such as Water Lilies have been reduced to purely a decorative role. Moreover, such works are now being sold in gallery gift shops on various different consumer goods such as t-shirts, tote bags, and mugs. Banksy puts forth a criticism in which timeless artworks have been dismounted from this acclaim. Now these works are reduced to a product driven by a capitalist consumerist society.

A secondary interpretation of the title pertains to the changing dreams and motivations under a consumerist society. Analysed at the artwork contextually with the title Banksy refers to Monet's idyllic 19th century scene as "outdated". Nature originally held advertising and literary connotation of enlightenment, romance, and an attainable end goal within society. Through the title of the work and the visual destruction of the landscape a secondary interpretation suggests that contemporary ideals have shifted towards a "hedonistic, pleasure-oriented consumer culture".

== Auction ==
The painting was initially expected to have a sale price between £3.5 and £5m. It was eventually sold for £7,551,600 after a nine-minute skirmish between five different potential buyers. The buyer of this work was unknown, but bought it through telephone bidding which was handled by Patti Wong of Sotheby's . At the time of the auction, Show Me the Monet had the second-highest auction price for a Banksy artwork, with the most expensive being Devoted Parliament.

The painting was put up for auction through Sotheby's auction house and was sold on 21 October 2020. It was included in the Modernités/Contemporary auction lot and was lot number 106. It was put up for sale by Steve Lazarides, Banksy's first agent. He acquired the painting in 2005 directly from Banksy.

The auction of Show Me the Monet was highly revered and very public. Due to the direct connection to Monet's Water Lilies, Banksy's appropriated painting was considered to be a "holy grail" and something serious collectors would be very interested in acquiring. The auction of the work was highly publicised with Alex Branczik (Sotheby's head of contemporary art) confirming the work was considered to be one of the "strongest and most iconic" works done by Banksy to appear at auction.

Banksy released a statement on Instagram regarding the painting's auction. He posted a quote by art critic Robert Hughes, acknowledging the record breaking sale and stating it was a "shame" he still didn't own the work.

== Exhibition ==
Show Me the Monet has been shown in two official exhibitions and one unofficial one. Within the auction information of the painting Sotheby's provided a comprehensive list of all past exhibitions of the work:

- London, 100 Westbourne Grove, Crude Oils: A Gallery of Re-mixed Masterpieces, Vandalism and Vermin, October 2005
- London, Lazinc Sackville, Banksy, Greatest Hits: 2002-2008, July - September 2018 (unofficial exhibition)
- Denmark, Silkeborg, Museum Jorn, Art Strikes Back: From Jorn to Banksy, September - December 2019, p. 13, illustrated, p. 40, illustrated in colour (installation view, Crude Oils, 100 Westbourne Grove, 2005) and p. 41, no. 7, illustrated in colour

== Crude Oils exhibition ==
Show Me the Monet was first exhibited at the Crude Oils exhibition, marking Banksy's second gallery exhibition at the disused shop space. The used shop was at 100 Westbourne Grove in Notting Hill, West London. The press release accompanying the exhibition labelled it as a "gallery of remixed masterpieces, vandalism and vermin". The exhibition contained 22 artworks. Prior to the public opening of the exhibition half of the works were sold, for between £10,000 and £22,000. It is unclear whether this sum is the collective total of the paintings sold or individual values.

Banksy publicised the private viewing prior to the public opening of the exhibition on his website. He warned of the gallery's limited space and noted there would be only 40 bottles of cheap wine at the private viewing. He advised that if patrons wanted a serious viewing of the paintings, they should come the following day on the public opening. This statement has been perceived to be a warning to potential scroungers not interested in the art.

The exhibition had entry limitations on the patrons' arrival. This was caused by Banksy's addition of live black rats who lived within the exhibition space. Approximately two hundred rats were loose on the floor, which their faeces adorned. Banksy hired the rats from a film and theatre company. Before entering the gallery space, patrons had to sign a disclaimer. What the disclaimer contained is unknown, but it is generally presumed that Banksy wouldn't be liable for any risks pertaining to the rats. The exhibition also contained a deceased gallery attendant dressed in a suit shirt, tie, coat and hat. The rats crawled around his skeleton, in between his shirt collar and vertebrae, and in and out of his exposed ribcage.

Neighbouring businesses threatened legal action towards the exhibition due to the live rats and permeating faecal smells. However, the show was cleared by the Environmental Health Services. The rats would go on to live in the glass front of the shop for the two-week duration of the exhibition.

The exhibition was considered to test the "critics' mettle" whilst also providing a deeper contextual investigation to the works presented. The rats living within the exhibition connected to a long existing motif within Banksy's work. He has continuously used rats to provide a symbolic representation within his work. Much like Banksy, the rat is known as a trickster in Chinese mythology. However, within a western context, rats have represented a lowly unwanted animal, containing disease and filth. They have become a significant part of Banksy's identity, drawing a parallel with graffiti artists' unwanted nature but their perseverance to persist in society. Banksy stated his fantasy for "all the little powerless losers" to "gang up together".

The rats also connect to the idea of a rat race or rat society in which people's qualities and way of living have something in common with rats. The symbolic representation of the rat connects to large themes within the exhibition and specifically the painting Show Me the Monet. This links to ideas of consumerism and capitalism for no greater good.

== Criticism ==
There has been limited criticism to the painting Show Me the Monet. There is initial criticism to the works perception and then a secondary criticism to the high selling price of the painting.

The initial criticism of the work pertains to Banksy’s continual discussion of socio-political issues that pertain to a cliché of the progressive left. The main centric criticism concerns that Banksy’s use of imagery and ideas are repetitive and uninteresting. Specifically with Show Me the Monet these criticisms specially relate to Banksy’s exploration of capitalism as a social exploiter or Monet’s masterful fine art is state or inaccessible to contemporary audiences. Show me the Monet was criticised to be “schoolboy stuff” lacking conceptual range and ambiguity, nothing more than a one liner.

A secondary criticism of the work is surrounding the conceptuality of the work and then the eventual high selling price of the painting. The auction of the work presented to be a point of criticism of the artworks statement when presented in conjunction with the sale price. As the painting deals with themes of capitalism and consumerism. There was question as to if the exurbian sale price undermined the message and concept of the work. The critique centres around the idea due to the high selling price the initial message of the work is overshadowed. Due to the themes of the painting the high auction price of the work invalidates the criticisms presented by Banksy. Moreover there is thought to be a mocking by the elite art buyers towards Banksy as their purchase shows little care towards the social message his work contains. The criticism of Show me the Monet is further extended to Banksy’s purchasable body of work; centred on the idea that while Banksy’s work continues to have monetary value his message would become “lost in the noise”.

This criticism was soon dismissed as it conversely added to the meaning. Art dealer Michael Reid confirmed the sale prices addition to the painting's meaning. Reid states that Banksy’s success comes from his “inversion of popular culture” at the expense of the upper class and high culture. The financial success at a public auction will also deeply cement the artwork into a cultural and art historical landscape.

== See also ==
- List of works by Banksy
