= Girl with a Pierced Eardrum =

Works by Banksy

- Artist: Banksy
- Completion date: 20 October 2014
- Type: Mural
- Medium: Stencil graffiti
- Movement: Street art
- Subject: Girl with a Pearl Earring by Johannes Vermeer
- Condition: Partially defaced
- Location: Albion Dockyard, Hanover Place, Spike Island, Bristol, England
- 51.447672°N 2.609816°W
- Preceded by: Mobile Lovers (2014)
- Followed by: The Son of a Migrant from Syria (2015)

Girl with a Pierced Eardrum is a 2014 mural by anonymous street artist Banksy, on the wall of a building in Hanover Place, Spike Island, Bristol, England. Appearing overnight on 20 October 2014, it is a parody of Girl with a Pearl Earring, c. 1665 by Johannes Vermeer, instead replacing the pearl earring with an existing security alarm.

The mural was partially defaced with black paint two days after it first appeared, on 22 October 2014.

== Description ==
Girl with a Pearl Earring, which the mural is based off

Girl with a Pierced Eardrum is at the end of a small alley on a building in Albion Dockyard in Hanover Place, Bristol. It is stencilled graffiti and depicts an enlarged version of part of Girl with a Pearl Earring, a c. 1665 oil-on-canvas painting by Johannes Vermeer. It is on a wall, positioned so that an existing yellow security alarm replaces the pearl earring.

It appeared overnight on 20 October 2014, with Banksy announcing the artwork on their website on the same day. Two days later, the mural was vandalised and partially defaced with black paint, above and to the left of the mural. No culprit has ever been identified.

== 2020 masking ==
In April 2020, a fabric face mask appeared on the wall, covering the face of the Girl in the mural. This referred to the masks worn by healthcare staff during the COVID-19 pandemic. It was not known exactly when the mask was installed, or who installed it. The BBC reportedly contacted Banksy at the time of the mask installation for comment.

== See also ==
- List of works by Banksy
