= Corrupted Oil Jerry =

Artwork by Banksy

- Artist: Banksy
- Year: 2003
- Subject: Jerry Mouse

Corrupted Oil - Jerry, also called Crude Oil Jerry, is a 2003 artwork by graffiti artist Banksy, using stencil of a cartoon mouse character Jerry on an oil painting.

It was valued by English antiques expert and television presenter Jonty Hearnden at £150,000 in 2014, which was a rise in value of 30 times what the owner originally paid.

== Exhibitions ==
The work was first seen in one of Banksy's first major exhibitions Turf War in 2003. It has been displayed in the Moco Museum of Amsterdam since 2016.

== Culture ==
In a 2024 BBC Culture analysis, American art critic Kelly Grovier argues that Banksy's Crude Oil Jerry (2003) exposes the romanticized falsehoods of John Constable's The Hay Wain (1821), revealing it as a "tinder-dry lie" in the face of industrialization. By adding the cartoon character Jerry Mouse holding a lit match to the pastoral scene, Banksy critiques the enduring, deceptive ideal of the British countryside, according to the article.

== See also ==
- List of works by Banksy
