= Mediterranean Sea View 2017 =

Artwork by Banksy

Mediterranean Sea View 2017 is a set of three reworked oil paintings designed by Banksy. Each portion of the piece depicts the Mediterranean seascape filled with life vests and flotation devices beached on the shores. Originally displayed in the Walled Off Hotel in Bethlehem, it was then donated to ABCD Bethlehem, a nonprofit medical organization. The set of three paintings was then sold in a Sotheby auction in 2020 for £2.2 million ($2.9 million), with the proceeds donated to providing medical equipment for the Bethlehem Arab Society for Rehabilitation (BASR) hospital. Two anonymous buyers bought the art, and the piece is currently in a private location.

== Description ==
Mediterranean Sea View 2017 is a triptych of reworked oil paintings. The centerpiece is the largest, with two smaller paintings at its side. Each section depicts a 19th-century seascape with crashing waves filled with empty lifejackets and buoys floating in the water or shored on land. The painting alludes to the lives lost at sea during the European migrant crisis of the 2010s. Many refugees struggled to cross the Mediterranean Sea in makeshift boats and rafts toward Italy and Greece, with thousands of migrants dying each year in the process. In 2015, more than 3,770 migrants were reported to have died crossing the Mediterranean. Although the European Union reported that the migration crisis was over in 2019, Banksy has continued projects to help with migration issues within the Mediterranean region.

The Mediterranean Sea View 2017 is not Banksy’s first piece created to address varying crises within Europe and the Middle East. Many Banksy paintings that visualize the conflicts between Israel and Palestine can be found in the Walled Off Hotel, the original location of Mediterranean Sea View 2017. The Walled Off Hotel was built next to the Israeli West Bank barrier, revealing a purposeful message of coexistence in the Holy Lands, according to hotel management. In addition to paintings, Banksy has created many public graffiti works in Israel and Palestine, with nine pieces being painted on the concrete barrier in 2005, including Rage, the Flower Thrower. Mediterranean Sea View 2017, among many other of Banksy’s art pieces, is an example of the artist publicly critiquing varying European and Middle Eastern government handlings of prevalent institutional and cultural issues.

== Style of painting ==
Mediterranean Sea View 2017 is an oil-paint triptych. A triptych has three connected panels of artwork and is a type of polyptych, the term for art pieces with multi-panel sections. The creation of Mediterranean Sea View 2017 consists of three reworked oil paintings of an original triptych. The original paintings consist of a 19th-century seascape that bears similarities to Romantic-era paintings. Although Banksy did not create the original oil paintings, the ‘found’ art pieces served as a platform to continue the artist’s contemporary messaging and public expression through existing spaces. Banksy is a self-professed “art vandal,” with the artist’s public graffiti art being painted on walls and spaces that do not belong to him.

Banksy’s other vandalistic art projects have symbolized issues similarly to how Mediterranean Sea View 2017 addressed the migration crisis. Near the French coastal town of Calais, Banksy painted the mural The Son of a Migrant from Syria, depicting Steve Jobs, Apple's creator. Commenting on the meaning behind the graffiti, Banksy explained that Steve Jobs was the son of a Syrian immigrant and that annual seven billion dollars in tax revenue “only exists because they allowed in a young man from Homs.” Although Banksy’s use of public spaces for art is illegal vandalism, the artist creates works that act as a tool for political and social messaging, ironically rebelling against institutional and political systems through the rebellious act of graffiti. As seen with both The Son of a Migrant from Syria and Mediterranean Sea View 2017, Banksy reuses existing land and art pieces to reveal prevalent issues of the migration crisis throughout the Mediterranean Basin.

== Sale and donation ==
The triptych was donated to a nonprofit organization named ABCD Bethlehem, a group that provides medical support to Palestinian children with disabilities. The paintings were then auctioned off by Sotheby on July 28, 2020, for more than £2.2 million ($2.9 million) to two anonymous buyers. The final sale nearly doubled the original pre-sale auction estimate of £1.2 million ($1.5 million), accumulating more revenue than expected. The proceeds from the auction were allocated towards building an acute stroke unit and buying children’s rehabilitation equipment for the Bethlehem Arab Society for Rehabilitation (BASR) hospital in Bethlehem.

== Interpretations ==
Mediterranean Sea View 2017 is one of many examples of how Banksy confronts political and cultural problems through the outlet of art. Mediterranean Sea View 2017 revealed the issues with the European migrant crisis by drawing the viewer's attention towards the deaths of the migrants. Although the European Union declared that the migrant crisis was over in March 2019, Banksy has continued to allocate resources toward solving migration issues. Although Mediterranean Sea View 2017 has been sold and its money has been donated to projects in the Middle East, Banksy continues to aid migrants traveling through the Mediterranean. An example of the artist’s modern-day efforts is seen through the artist-funded relief ship, the M.V. Louise Michel.

== See also ==
- List of works by Banksy
