= Valentine's day mascara =

2023 artwork by Banksy

Valentine's Day Mascara
- Artist: Banksy
- Year: 2023
- Location: Margate, Kent, England; 51.3848°N 1.3817°E

Valentine's Day Mascara is a 2023 artwork by England-based graffiti artist and political activist, Banksy. It appeared on the side of a house in Margate, Kent, on 14 February, Valentine's Day. The work depicts a woman shutting a man in a nearby discarded freezer.

== Description ==
The piece is painted on the side of a house on Park Place, to the rear of Grosvenor Place in Margate. It depicts an injured 1950s housewife with a missing tooth and a swollen eye shutting a man in a nearby, discarded freezer chest. She is dressed in a blue apron with yellow washing up gloves. Beside her is a frying pan with red paint on it. The work incorporates a chest freezer that had been abandoned in the street next to the house.

== History ==
Thanet District Council removed the fridge after the appearance of the artwork, claiming the "fridge freezer which is believed to have been part of the installation has been removed by council operatives on the grounds of safety as it was on public land", and would be returned once it had been 'made safe'. Other items by the piece were removed including an empty beer bottle, a broken garden chair and a crate.

The Thanet District Council said they would contact the property owner to discuss the preservation of the artwork. The owner subsequently contacted an art gallery to help preserve the artwork and said that she was "trying to balance the needs of the tenant and the local art community".

The work was posted by Banksy on his Instagram page. It has been interpreted as statement about violence against women. Local residents expressed shock that the area had been cleaned by the council so quickly, with complaints about rubbish usually taking weeks to resolve.

Banksy had previously created a different work on Valentine's Day in Bristol in 2018.

== See also ==
- List of works by Banksy
