= Forgive Us Our Trespasses =

Forgive Us Our Trespasses may refer to:

- Forgive Us Our Trespasses (album), a 2009 album by A Storm of Light
- Forgive Us Our Trespasses (film), a 1956 French drama film

== See also ==
- Forgive Us Our Trespassing, a piece by graffiti artist Banksy
