= Civilian Drone Strike (Banksy) =

2017 artwork by Banksy

- Artist: Banksy
- Year: 2017
- Preceded by: The Son of a Migrant from Syria
- Followed by: Love Is in the Bin

Civilian Drone Strike is a 2017 artwork by Banksy. The work depicts three General Atomics MQ-1 Predator drones flying above a child's drawing of a bombed house with a child and pet looking on at the destruction. The piece was donated to the Art the Arms Fair exhibition, which was held to coincide with the 2017 DSEI arms fair. The exhibition was organised by activists including the peace campaigner Sam Walton (peace activist), who said the work was a critique of the military-industrial complex. The work sold for £205,000. Proceeds from the sale have been donated to Campaign Against Arms Trade and Reprieve.

== See also ==
- List of works by Banksy
