= Wall art =

Wall art may refer to:

- Any visual artwork that hangs on a wall
- Mural, art painted on or applied directly to a wall or other permanent surface
- Wall decal, a vinyl sticker that can be affixed to a wall
- Wall Art or Peckham Rock, a fake cave painting by Banksy
