= Self Portrait (Banksy) =

Work by Banksy

- Artist: Banksy
- Medium: Graffiti

Self Portrait is a work by graffiti artist Banksy. In 2007, it sold for £198,000, nearly five times its estimated pre-sale value.

== See also ==
- Self-portraiture
- List of works by Banksy
