= Banksus Militus Ratus =

Artwork by Banksy

Banksus Militus Ratus is a piece of artwork by British artist Banksy. The piece consists of a stuffed rat with a spray can in a glass-fronted box. Banksy first exhibited the piece in 2004 in the foyer of London's Natural History Museum, without the museum's consent.

In 2014 the piece went on auction at Sotheby's for an amount higher than £500,000. Sotheby's did not disclose the exact figure.

== See also ==
- List of works by Banksy
