= Well Hung Lover =

Mural in Bristol

Coordinates: 51.453°N 2.601°W

- Naked Man Hanging From Wall, Naked Man
- Artist: Banksy
- Year: 2006
- Type: Mural
- Medium: Stencil graffiti
- Movement: Street art
- Location: Bristol

Well Hung Lover, also called Naked Man Hanging From Window and simply Naked Man, is a mural by the anonymous street artist Banksy, on a wall in Frogmore Street, Bristol, England.

Painted in 2006 on the side of a sexual health clinic, Well Hung Lover depicts a naked man hanging from a window, while a suited man looks out, next to a woman in her underwear. Despite featuring nudity, it is the first legal piece of street art in the UK following a survey by Bristol City Council, resulting in retrospective permission and protection being granted.

In 2009, the mural was defaced by a paintball gun, resulting in a partial restoration by the City Council. However, some paint splatters remain on the artwork. It was defaced a second time in 2018, with black spray paint.

== Design ==
Well Hung Lover is stencilled graffiti and depicts a naked man hanging from a windowsill by his right arm; his left arm covering his genitals. Looking out of the window are two people: a suited man on the left, and a woman in lingerie on the right, touching his shoulder.

The scenario portrayed is that the suited man is the woman's husband, and, suspecting her of having an extramarital affair with the naked man, is looking out of the window to search for him.

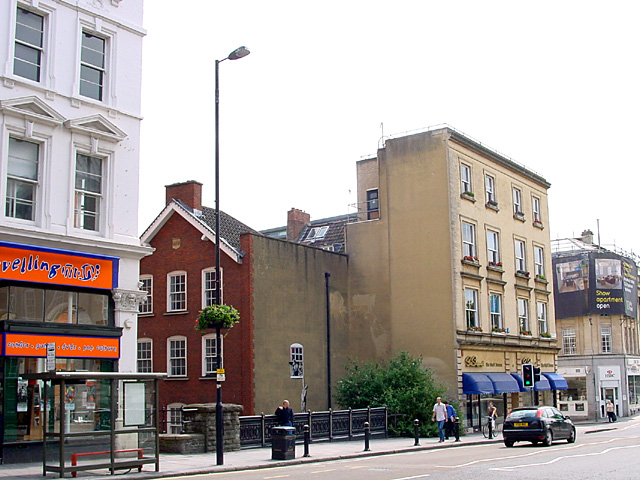
The mural as seen from Park Street in 2006. Brook Sexual Health Clinic is the red brick building in the middle, with the mural on the side wall.

At the time of creation, the artwork was stencilled on the side wall of Brook Sexual Health Clinic on Frogmore Street, which has since relocated. Banksy was reportedly unaware that the building was a sexual health clinic, and found humour in the irony when they were told via email. As the mural is approximately 5 metres (16 ft) above street level, it is almost level with, and can be best viewed from, the Park Street bridge, above Frogmore Street.

=== Creation ===
In order to get to the appropriate height and maintain the mural's secrecy during its creation, scaffolding was erected against the wall, covered by tarpaulin. After three days, the council removed the scaffolding, discovering the artwork.

== History ==
Well Hung Lover appeared at a time when the City Council's policy was to crack down on graffiti; the council was initially opposed to the mural. However, some residents supported the work, saying it "brightened up" the area. Following pressure to keep the mural, the council created an online poll asking whether or not it should be kept; 97% of respondents supported it, leading to retrospective permission being granted for the mural- the first legal street art mural in the UK. The council stressed that this was an exception, and that future street art would not necessarily be tolerated.

In 2020, as part of the inaugural Bristol Festival Of Light, Well Hung Lover was incorporated into a new piece of artwork called Neighbours. Limbic Cinema projected nine windows alongside Banksy's piece, with local artists Jasmine Thompson, Inkie, Parys Gardener and Zoe Power, all creating animated artworks depicting various scenes from Bristol's history and under-represented communities.

=== Defacements ===
On the night of 22 June 2009, 10 days into the Banksy Versus Bristol exhibition at Bristol City Museum and Art Gallery just up the road, the mural was defaced by seven blue paintballs fired at the mural with a paintball gun. The perpetrator was never identified, although one suspect was King Robbo, due to his rivalry with Banksy at the time.

Councillor Gary Hopkins described the vandalism as "disappointing" and promised that the council would remove the paint stains. Three of the seven splatters have since been removed, but the council cannot remove the others without damaging the work, so they remain.

Well Hung Lover was defaced again on 24 February 2018, with black graffiti tags, beside and below the work, with phrases "KAPE", "SOAK", and "FUCK BANKSY". The legs of the hanging man were also sprayed over.

=== Building sale ===
In November 2024, it was announced that the mural was being sold as part of the building that it was on (1 Unity Street), via auction in February 2025. The building is listed as a former nightclub with a guide price of £700,000 and with a covenant in the lease that the mural must be maintained or insured, and that it must remain publicly visible on the building.

== See also ==
- List of works by Banksy
- Works by Banksy that have been damaged or destroyed
- Bristol underground scene
