= Slave Labour (mural) =

Painting by Banksy (street artist)

Coordinates: 51.5911°N 0.1037°W

The Slave Labour mural as it appeared in May 2012

Slave Labour is a mural that was painted by a British graffiti artist, Banksy, on the side wall of a Poundland store in Wood Green, London in May 2012. The artwork is 48 inches (122 cm) high by 60 inches (152 cm) wide, and depicts an urchin child at a sewing machine assembling a bunting of Union Jack patches. The work was a protest against the use of sweatshops to manufacture Diamond Jubilee and London Olympics memorabilia in 2012.

In February 2013 the mural was removed from its location and put up for sale at Fine art Auctions in Miami, US. After an appeal from the residents of Wood Green the mural was withdrawn from sale in the US and returned to the UK. It was sold at an auction in Covent Garden, London for (USD) $1.2 million.

== Removal and sale ==
There is controversy over the disappearance of the mural, as a portion of the wall was physically removed from the building the artwork was sprayed upon. The owners of the building have not commented on whether it was legally or illegally sold and removed.

When the mural disappeared in February 2013 it was listed for sale on an on-line site and later appeared for sale at the Fine Art Auctions Miami for half a million dollars ($500,000). The auction house insisted the artwork was acquired through a legitimate transaction with a "well known" collector." The listing of the art at auction outraged some Wood Green residents, who believed the work was a gift to them, and that listing the artwork for sale at auction contradicted the wishes of the artist whose message called for an end to exploitation in the name of capitalism.

Despite claims that the acquisition of the artwork was legitimate, the FAAM director Frederic Thut withdrew the artwork, even after three bids had already been placed.

On 22 February 2013, a stencil of what is believed to be Banksy's signature rat holding a sign saying "Why?" appeared on the right of the area where the "Slave Labour" mural once stood, sparking views that it was a consolation to the community. To the left of that space, appeared the message ‘"Danger Thieves." The rat artwork was covered in plexiglass to protect it but a representative of Banksy claimed that the rat is a fake, and other Banksy enthusiasts agree.

=== Eventual sale of mural at auction ===
After protest from the residents of Wood Green the mural was returned to the UK. On 3 June 2013, it was on sold for over £750,000 (US$1.1m) by Bankrobber London at an auction held in the basement of the London Film Museum in Covent Garden by the Sincura Group. It was sold again in 2018 at Julien's Auctions in Los Angeles, United States for $730,000 (£561,000) to artist Ron English, who planned to whitewash the work in protest against purchases and sales of street art.

== Interview with Banksy ==
When prompted to comment on the sale of his artworks through auction houses, Banksy replied by giving a quote from Henri Matisse: "I was very embarrassed when my canvases began to fetch high prices, I saw myself condemned to a future of painting nothing but masterpieces." Furthermore, in previous attempts to sell his artwork, he has stated his position, "For the sake of keeping all street art where it belongs I'd encourage people not to buy anything by anybody unless it was created for sale in the first place."

== See also ==
- List of works by Banksy
