= Silent Majority (Banksy) =

1998 painting by Banksy

- Artist: Banksy
- Year: 1998
- Dimensions: 240 cm × 990 cm (94 in × 390 in)

Silent Majority (or Fragile Silence) is a 1998 painting by graffiti artist Banksy. It was painted during the 1998 Glastonbury Festival, shows soldier-like figures landing on a beach with a speaker in an inflatable raft. A quote written over the top of the piece says: "It's better not to rely too much on silent majorities ... for silence is a fragile thing... one loud noise and it's gone." The work was painted freehand, rather than using stencils as has been Banksy's signature, and is a rare example of the artist's early work, said a British street art expert Mary McCarthy.

The metal piece measures 2.4m (7.8ft) by 9.9m (32ft). It was painted in collaboration with fellow Bristol artist Inkie. The trailer's owner, Nathan, said "Banksy approached him in 1998 - before he rose to fame - to ask if he could use it as a canvas for a piece commissioned by the festival." A couple who owned the mobile trailer gave permission to Banksy to paint their home in exchange for two tickets to the Glastonbury Festival.

The trailer has fetched £445,792 ($676,668) at an auction in Paris. and has sold for 620,000 euros, or the equivalent of $848,516, including fees.

== See also ==
- List of works by Banksy
