= Bomb Hugger =

2003 painting by Banksy

Bomb Hugger is a 2003 painting by graffiti artist Banksy. In 2007, it sold for £31,200 at Sotheby's.

== Print release ==
Bomb Hugger was released as a limited edition screenprint by publishers Pictures on Walls in 2004 as a signed edition of 150 and an unsigned edition of 600.

== See also ==
- List of works by Banksy
- List of works by Banksy that have been damaged or destroyed
- 2003 in art
