= Untitled (2004) =

Graffiti art

- Artist: Banksy
- Year: 2004
- Medium: Stencil and spray paint on canvas
- Movement: Street art, stencilling
- Location: London
- Owner: Private collection

Untitled (2004) is a work by graffiti artist Banksy. In February 2007 it was sold at Sothebys London for £33,600 during a two-day action that included three other works by Banksy, all of which sold for unprecedented amounts: Bomb Middle England (sold for £102,000), Ballerina with Action Man Parts (£96,000) and Glory (£72,000). To coincide with the second day of auctions, Banksy updated his website with a new image of an auction house scene showing people bidding on a picture that said: “I Can’t Believe You Morons Actually Buy This Shit.”

In October 2007, a separate untitled work by Banksy, featuring a classically dressed painter poised with his brushes before an easel in the midst of artistic endeavour, was set to be auctioned at London's Lazarides Soho House for an estimated £50,000.

== See also ==
- List of works by Banksy
