= Space Girl and Bird =

Painting by Banksy

Space Girl and Bird is a painting by graffiti artist Banksy. The spray painted on steel work was commissioned by Blur to serve as cover art for their album Think Tank. In 2007, it was sold at auction to an American bidder for £288,000, twenty times its estimate value.

== See also ==
- List of works by Banksy
