= The Village Pet Store and Charcoal Grill =

Art installation by Banksy

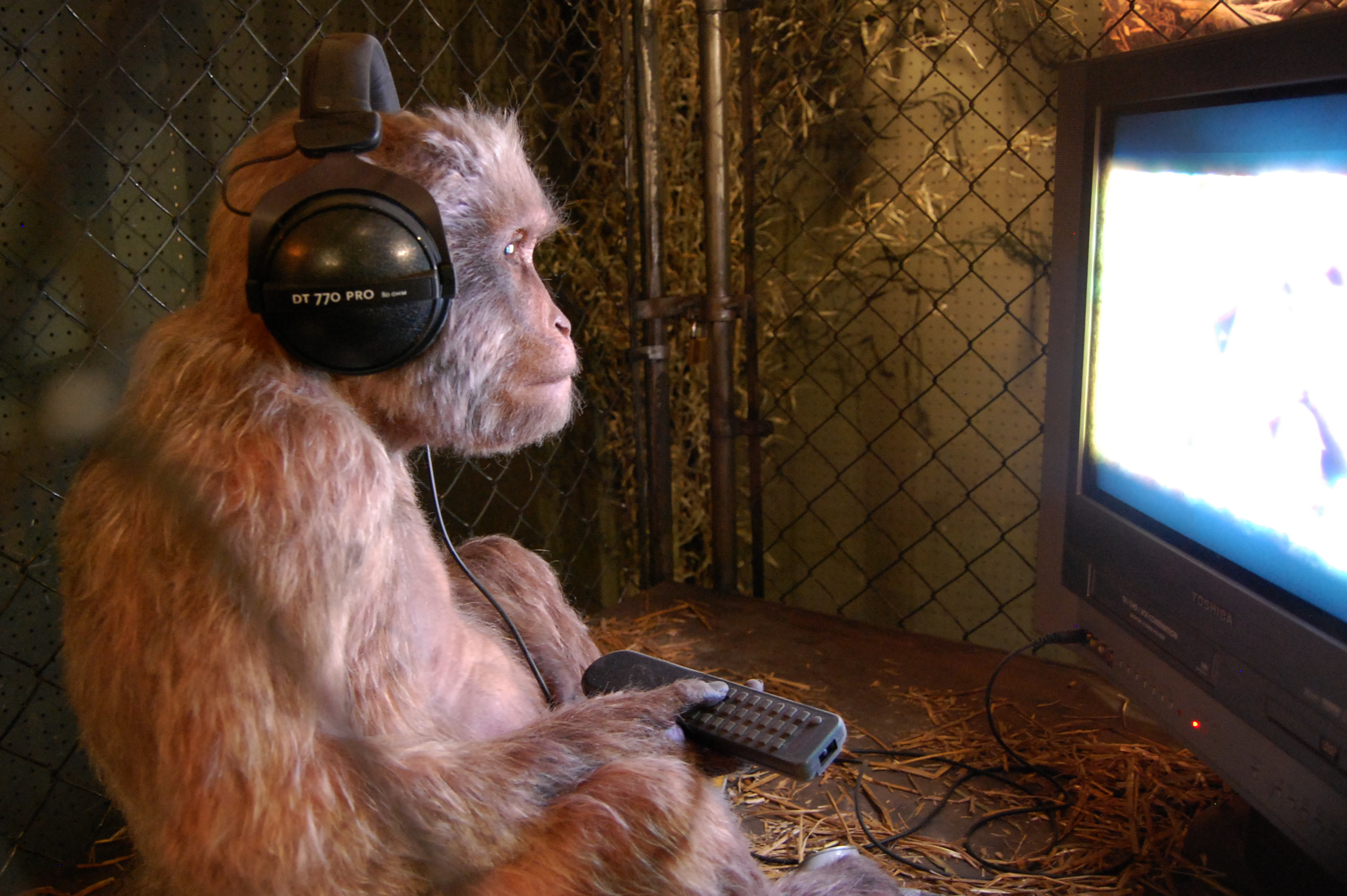
- Artist: Banksy
- Year: 2008

The Village Pet Store and Charcoal Grill is an art installation by Banksy. Held in Greenwich Village in 2008, it marked the graffiti artist's first official exhibition in New York. The installation took the form of a fake pet shop and aimed to question "our relationship with animals and the ethics and sustainability of factory farming".

Banksy said that "New Yorkers don't care about art, they care about pets. So I'm exhibiting them instead." The installation featured a variety of bizarre exhibits, including animatronic hot-dogs apparently performing a sex act; chicken nuggets with legs, dipping themselves in sauce; and a robot monkey wearing headphones, watching TV in a cage.

== See also ==
- List of works by Banksy
