= The Whitehouse, Liverpool =

Pub in Liverpool, England

Coordinates: 53.40019°N 2.97659°W

The Whitehouse
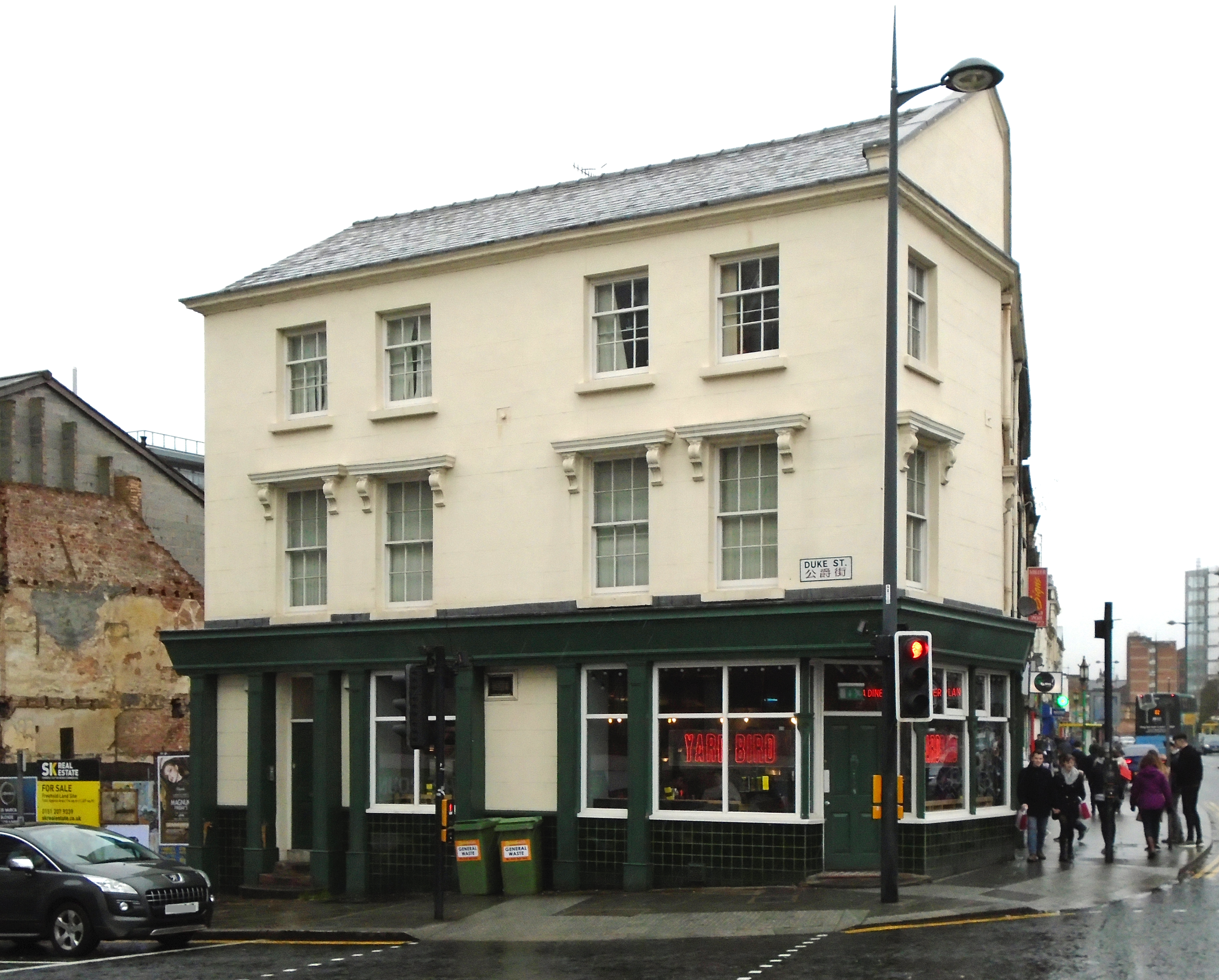
- The Whitehouse, April 2010
- Interactive map of The Whitehouse
- Location: 183-185 Duke Street, Liverpool, Merseyside, England
- Built: c. 1800

Listed Building – Grade II
- Designated: 6 July 2004

The Whitehouse was a pub in a Grade II listed building in Duke Street, Liverpool, England. The side of the building had an image of a giant rat holding a marker pen by graffiti artist Banksy. In February 2010, the building sold for £114,000 at auction, and has since been turned into a restaurant called Petit Cafe du Coin, following the removal and sale of the rat mural.
