= Bombing Middle England =

Painting by Banksy

Bombing Middle England is a painting by graffiti artist Banksy. It is made of acrylic and spray paint on canvas, and depicts pensioners bowling with bombs in a manner reminiscent of Cinders McLeod's 1999 drawing Anarchic Granny.

In 2007, it fetched £102,000 at Sotheby's, twice its estimated value of £50,000. This marked the highest amount paid for one of Banksy's works to date, August 2018. In 2021 his half shredded version of ‘girl with balloon’ was sold for almost £20,000,000.

== Print release ==
The motif featured in Bombing Middle England was released as a limited edition series of screen prints in 2005 by publishers Pictures on Walls. The series consisted of 50 signed versions and 500 unsigned versions.

== See also ==
- List of works by Banksy
