= Devolved Parliament (Banksy) =

2009 oil-on-canvas painting by Banksy

- Artist: Banksy
- Year: 2009
- Medium: Oil on canvas
- Dimensions: 2.5 m × 4.2 m (8 ft 2 in × 13 ft 9 in)

Devolved Parliament is a 2009 oil-on-canvas painting by Banksy, replacing British politicians debating in the House of Commons with chimpanzees. In 2019, the artwork became Banksy's most costly to date, selling for £9.9 million ($12.2 million) at Sotheby's in London on October 3, 2019.

The work measures 2.5 m × 4.2 m (8 ft 2 in × 13 ft 9 in). It was titled Question Time when first shown at the Bristol Museum & Art Gallery's 2009 Banksy show. It was sold to a private collector in 2011. A reworked and retitled version of the painting was exhibited in Bristol in March 2019, with changes to details such as a banana and some lamps. Banksy commented, "Laugh now, but one day no-one will be in charge".

The depiction of chimpanzees echoes Banksy's 2002 work Laugh Now, a 6-foot-long stencilled work showing a row of apes wearing aprons with the inscription "Laugh now, but one day we'll be in charge", and the similar Keep it Real. Chimpanzees are a theme that has occurred throughout Banksy's oeuvre, as a satirical device in the tradition of the singerie that depicts monkeys imitating human behavior. Examples include his Self-Portrait (2000) which shows a person holding spray cans but with a chimpanzee's head, and Monkey Queen (2003) based on a portrait of Elizabeth II with a chimpanzee's face.

== See also ==
- List of works by Banksy
- List of most expensive artworks by living artists
