= One Nation Under CCTV =

Mural by Banksy in London, England

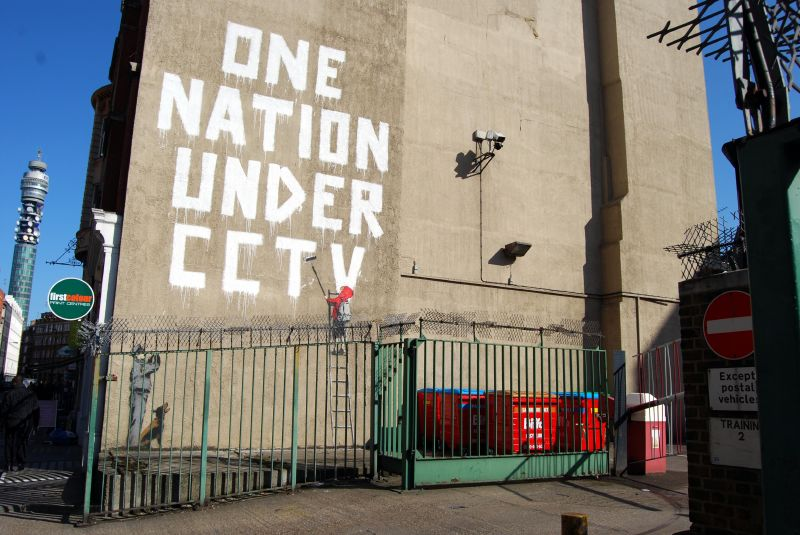
- Artist: Banksy
- Type: Mural
- Medium: Paint
- Location: London, United Kingdom; 51.5172°N 0.1352°W

One Nation Under CCTV was a 2007 mural by graffiti artist Banksy on Newman Street in London. Painted on the wall of a building used by the Royal Mail, it depicted a child in a red hooded top painting the phrase, while being watched by a police officer and a dog. The mural was situated next to a CCTV camera. In 2008, the Westminster City Council ordered the work's removal because it was an unlicensed commercial. The mural was painted over in April 2009.

== See also ==
- List of works by Banksy
- List of public art formerly in London
- Works by Banksy that have been damaged or destroyed
- Privacy
