= Follow Your Dreams (Banksy) =

Mural by Banksy in Boston, Massachusetts

Follow Your Dreams

Follow Your Dreams was a work of street art by Banksy, located on Essex Street in the Chinatown area of Boston, United States. Completed in 2010, it was among the earliest of his works in the United States.

The work depicted a man holding a brush and bucket stood by a handprinted sign saying "follow your dreams." The drip-dried slogan, which is a dark grey along with the man, had a red stamp over it reading "cancelled".

== See also ==
- List of works by Banksy
