= Parachuting Rat =

Series of artworks by Banksy in Melbourne, Australia

- Artist: Banksy
- Year: 2003
- Medium: Stencils and spray paint
- Movement: Street art
- Subject: A black rat with aviator glasses descending by parachute
- Location: Melbourne

One of the Parachuting Rat stencils in Melbourne

Parachuting Rat was a series of artworks in Melbourne, created by Banksy. On 26 April 2010, one was painted over by council contractors, leading to local and international coverage and debate on the nature of street art and its preservation, and new measures for its protection.

Another was accidentally destroyed in May 2012 by building work. As of 2015, there was one still remaining.

== Concept ==
Parachuting Rat was a black rat with aviator glasses descending by parachute. Banksy's oeuvre is largely directed towards anti-capitalist and anti-war themes, and this piece was painted in 2003. Banksy's work is described as distinctive in style, satirical, and provocative. Banksy himself has written, in connection with his works involving rats, 'they exist without permission. They are hated, hunted and persecuted … if you are dirty, insignificant and unloved then rats are the ultimate role model'; that 'you can win the rat race but you're still a rat'; and also that he had been painting rats for three years before someone told him that the word is an anagram of art.

== Medium ==
Parachuting Rat was executed using stencils and spray paint. While earlier in his career Banksy painted freehand, in his later work from the mid-2000s he adopted the use of stencils to accelerate the creative process and reduce the likelihood of being caught. His works generally appear anonymously and overnight. Banksy has written that 'graffiti…is the most honest artform available. There is no elitism or hype … nobody is put off by the price of admission. A wall has always been the best place to publish your work'.

== Context ==
Melbourne is recognised as the street art capital of Australia. Banksy, who spent a few months in the city earlier in his career, described the city's street art as 'arguably Australia's most significant contribution to the arts since they stole all the Aborigines' pencils'. Parachuting Rat is one of a number of works he executed in the city in 2003.

Parachuting Rat adorned the wall above a doorway of a council building behind the Forum Theatre in Hosier Lane, a tourist attraction which attracts up to a thousand people a day because of its street art. While Hosier Lane had at the time five approved areas for street art, Parachuting Rat was not in one of these. It was allowed to remain 'by exception' because the council was aware of the popularity of Banksy's works.

== Removal ==
While Melbourne has a policy of encouraging street art, it also has a problem with gangs tagging walls and public property. Melbourne's deputy Lord Mayor Susan Riley sent cleaners to Hosier Lane after residents complained about squalid conditions in the alley. The cleaners were instructed to tidy up the rat-infested garbage and remove all graffiti from unapproved street art sites. Leaving alone the approved sites, the cleaners painted over Parachuting Rat, by then thought to be the only remaining work by Banksy on public view in the city, with a thick layer of battleship-grey paint. Challenged at the time by a local resident, the cleaners replied 'we are just doing what we're told'.

Another was destroyed in May 2012 by builders working on plumbing. The building owner, who knows Banksy through a New York contact, said that he laughed at the fact that "TV Cameras took an interest in his work" in an email she sent them about the incident.

== Reaction ==
=== Melbourne Council ===
Robert Doyle, Lord Mayor of Melbourne, who had recently posed for a publicity photo before Hosier Lane's street art, praised such art as 'legitimate expression of artistic intent', although he also said Parachuting Rat 'was not the Mona Lisa' and declared it an 'honest mistake' by the cleaners. Melbourne City Council CEO Kathy Alexander said it was not an error on the part of the cleaners since they had been instructed to clean all unapproved areas, and had not been informed of its cultural significance. She also highlighted that there was no legal permit for the Parachuting Rat, and acknowledged that the council should have acted sooner to approve and protect all known Banksy works.

The council subsequently discussed whether it should invite artists to restore their damaged works and announced that it would issue retrospective legal permits to ensure other famous and significant works of street art are protected. The difficulty of protecting street art was also acknowledged. The council had previously attempted to protect 'Diving Bell' by Banksy by erecting a perspex sheet; its vandalism in 2008 was linked to discontent within the street art community over bureaucratic interference.

=== Art world ===
Parachuting Rat was potentially worth tens of thousands of pounds. An ABC debate suggested that street art is by nature ephemeral; that it should not be heritage-listed and protected with glass; that in restoring a painting you see not the artist's work but a representation of that work; and also raised the questions of ownership, public art, finance, and the egalitarianism of the selective preservation of works of art.

Within a few days ten replacement parachute rats, in fluorescent shades of pink, blue, green and purple were created in Hosier Lane using stencils, along with another rat in the lifts of 121 Exhibition Street, the offices of the Department of Justice. An anonymous expert in Banksy and Melbourne's street art observed 'I think [Banksy] delights in placing authorities and councils in this funny position of trying to preserve his work because it's worth so much money now'. He also claimed that there were a number of other works by Banksy in the city and argued that the locations should remain undisclosed to protect them from destruction. Later in 2010 an image of a rat stolen from an electricity meter box outside the home of a well-known underwear designer was claimed to be by Banksy; the authenticity of this work was questioned, with some calling it a fake.

== See also ==
- Street art in Melbourne
- Banksy
- List of works by Banksy
- List of damaged or destroyed works by Banksy
- Ephemera
- Bird in Space
