= Cardinal Sin (Banksy) =

2011 sculpture by Banksy

- Artist: Banksy
- Medium: Sculpture
- Location: Walker Art Gallery, Liverpool

Cardinal Sin is a 2011 sculpture by graffiti artist Banksy. It is a bust of a cardinal with his face sawn off and replaced with blank tiles. The work was unveiled at the Walker Art Gallery in 2011.

== See also ==
- List of works by Banksy
