= Peckham Rock =

Archaeological forgery

Peckham Rock, also called Wall Art, is a 2005 artwork by British street artist Banksy, in the form of a lump of concrete decorated in the style of a cave painting and depicting "a supposed prehistoric figure pushing a shopping trolley". It was originally displayed in the British Museum, without the knowledge of the museum staff, after being installed there by Banksy.

== Original installation ==
Peckham Rock is a piece of concrete, approximately 15 cm × 25 cm, supposedly sourced from Peckham but actually from Hackney. It depicts a buffalo, pierced by arrows, and a "lumbering hominin-like figure" pushing a shopping trolley.

In a 2005 art intervention, Banksy clandestinely attached the rock to a wall in the "Roman Britain" collection of the British Museum, with a placard in the style of the museum with the title "Wall art" that dated the piece to the "post catatonic era" and credited it to a little-known artist named "Banksymus Maximus".

The work went undiscovered for "several days", with later sources giving more specific but inconsistent amounts of time ranging from "three days", to "weeks". It was not the first such installation by Banksy; in 2003, he similarly hung a painting in the Tate, and earlier in 2005, he installed a fake beetle in the American Museum of Natural History in New York.

== Subsequent exhibits ==
After Peckham Rock was removed from the British Museum's walls, it was re-exhibited in 2005 at the Outside Institute in London, listed as on loan from Banksy and the British Museum.

Banksy stated that he did not intend to retrieve Peckham Rock, and the British Museum wrote at the time that they were accepting it "as a donation to its collections". However, it was eventually labelled as "lost property" and returned to Banksy. The only Banksy work actually in the museum's permanent collection is a counterfeit ten-pound note featuring Princess Diana.

Peckham Rock returned to public display in the British Museum in 2018, on loan from Banksy, for an exhibit on protest art titled "I object".

== See also ==
- List of works by Banksy
