= Ballerina with Action Man Parts =

Sculpture by Banksy

- Artist: Banksy
- Completion date: 2007
- Medium: Sculpture

Ballerina with Action Man Parts is a 2007 sculpture by graffiti artist Banksy. In 2007, it sold for £96,000.

== See also ==
- List of works by Banksy
