= List of works by Banksy =

The following is a list of works by Banksy. Banksy, active since the 1990s, is an England-based graffiti artist, political activist and film director whose real identity is unknown. Banksy's satirical street art and subversive epigrams combine dark humour with graffiti executed in a distinctive stencilling technique. Banksy's works of political and social commentary have been featured on streets, walls, and bridges of cities throughout the world.

Name	Type	Year	Location	Reference
Aachoo!!	Mural	2020	Bristol, UK	
The Antics Roadshow	Film	2011	united kingdom	
Art Buff	Mural	2014	Folkestone	
Ballerina with Action Man Parts	Sculpture	2007		
The Banality of the Banality of Evil		2013		
Banksus Militus Ratus	Art installation	2004	Natural History Museum, London	
Better Out Than In	Art installation	2013	New York City	
Bomb Hugger	Painting	2003	London’s East End	
Bombing Middle England	Painting	2003		
Cardinal Sin	Sculpture	2011		
Cash Machine Girl	Mural	2008	Exmouth Market in North London	
Civilian Drone Strike		2017		
Corrupted Oil Jerry		2003		
Create Escape	Mural	2021	Reading, UK	
Crude Oil (Vettriano)	Painting	2005		
Designated Picnic Area		2004		
Devolved Parliament	Painting	2009		
Dismaland	Art installation	2015	Weston-super-Mare, UK	
Dream Boat		2015		
The Drinker	Statue	2004		
Exit Through the Gift Shop	Film	2010		
Flower Thrower	Mural	2003	Beit Sahour, West Bank	
Flying Copper		2003	Turf War exhibition in London	
Flying Balloon Girl	Mural	2005	Palestine	
Follow Your Dreams	Mural	2010	Boston, US	
Forgive Us Our Trespassing	Mural	2011	Salt Lake City, US	
Fragile Silence	Painting	1998		
Game Changer		2020		
Gentleman rat		2007		
Girl with a Pierced Eardrum	Mural	2014	Bristol, UK	
Girl with Balloon	Mural (series)	2002	London, UK	
Glory		2005		
Gorilla in a Pink Mask		2011		
Greenwashed Tree	Mural	2024	London, UK	
A Great British Spraycation		2021		
Guard with Balloon Dog		2010		
Hula Hooping Girl		2020		
If You Don't Mask, You Don't Get		2020		
I Remember When All This Was Trees	Mural	2010	Detroit	
Kissing Coppers	Mural	2004		
Leake Street	Mural	2008	Lambeth, London	
London animal series	Murals	2024		
Love Is in the Bin (initially: Girl with Balloon)	Art installation	2018	Sotheby's London, UK	
Madonna and Child		2024		
Mediterranean Sea View 2017		2017		
The Mild Mild West	Mural	1997	Bristol, UK	
Mobile Lovers	Mural	2014	Bristol, UK	
MoneyBart	TV episode	2010		
Monkey Queen		2003		
No Ball Games	Mural	2009		
One Nation Under CCTV	Mural	2007	London, UK	
Painting for Saints		2020		
Parachuting Rat		2003	Melbourne, Australia	
Peace Dove		2005		
Policeman with Balloon Dog		2010		
Politician rat		2008	Bond St, London, UK	
Rat with baseball bat		2005	Kentish Town, London, UK	
Rat with microphone		2007 or earlier	Chalk Farm, London, UK	
Reindeers (sleigh bench)		2019	Birmingham, UK	
Rose on a Mousetrap		Early 2000s	Bristol, UK	
Unnamed Royal Courts of Justice mural	Mural	2025	London, UK	
Scar of Bethlehem	Art installation	2019	Bethlehem	
Season's Greetings	Mural	2018	Port Talbot, Wales	
Self Portrait	Mural	2000		
Shop Till You Drop	Mural	2011		
Show Me the Monet	Painting	2005		part of Banksy's Crude Oil series
Simple Intelligence Testing in Dumb Animals (Monkey Business)		2000		
Slave Labour	Mural	2012	Wood Green, London	
Soldier Perquisition		2007		
Space Girl and Bird	Painting	2003		
Spy Booth	Mural	2014	Cheltenham, England	
Statue of man with flag	Statue	2026	Waterloo Place, Westminster	
Take the Money and Run		Early 1990s		
The Son of a Migrant from Syria	Mural	2015		
The Village Pet Store and Charcoal Grill	Art installation	2008		
The Walled Off Hotel		2005	Bethlehem, Palestine	
Think Tank	Album cover	2003		
Thug for Life (Policeman)		2015		
Toxic Mary		2003		
Toxic Rat		2006		
Untitled (2004)	Painting	2004		
Valentine's Day Mascara	Mural with adjacent refrigerator	2023	Margate, UK	
Valentine's Banksy	Mural	2020	Bristol, UK	
Will Work for Idiots		2010		
Well Hung Lover	Mural	2006	Bristol, UK	
Yellow Line Flower Painter		2007		
Zero Interest in People		2010		

== See also ==
- List of works by Banksy that have been damaged or destroyed
