= Valentine's Banksy =

Mural by Banksy in Bristol, England

- Artist: Banksy
- Year: 2020
- Preceded by: Love Is in the Bin
- Followed by: Painting for Saints

Valentine's Banksy is a 2020 mural by the graffiti artist Banksy. It appeared in Bristol, United Kingdom in the early hours of the morning on 13 February 2020, prior to Valentine's Day.

The picture shows a young girl firing a burst of red flowers and leaves from a slingshot.

== Vandalism ==
Following the completion of the mural, it was vandalised within 48 hours.

== See also ==
- List of works by Banksy
- List of works by Banksy that have been damaged or destroyed
