= Painting for Saints =

2020 painting by Banksy

- Artist: Banksy
- Year: 2020
- Subject: NHS Workers
- Owner: Southampton General Hospital
- Preceded by: Valentine's Banksy
- Followed by: If You Don't Mask, You Don't Get

Painting for Saints or Game Changer is a 2020 painting by Banksy, who donated it to the Southampton General Hospital in Southern England, United Kingdom. The artwork depicts a child playing with a toy nurse, having selected the toy over superheroes Batman and Spider-Man, and was unveiled during the COVID-19 pandemic. The painting is largely monochrome apart from a red cross on the nurse's uniform. It was delivered to the hospital together with a note: "Thanks for all you're doing. I hope this brightens the place up a bit, even if its only black and white". The hospital titled the artwork Painting for Saints, which references "The Saints", a nickname for Southampton F.C. Banksy himself posted the image on his Instagram account with the caption "Game Changer".

The artwork remained at the hospital until it was auctioned off to benefit charities affiliated with the National Health Service. It was sold for £14.4m (£16.8m including buyer premium) on 23 March 2021, which at the time was a record for a work by Banksy.

== See also ==
- List of works by Banksy
