= Banksy's London animal series =

2024 artworks by Banksy

In August 2024 a series of nine artworks of animals by Banksy appeared in London over nine days. The artworks do not have titles and were confirmed by Banksy on his Instagram on the day of their appearance.

== Description ==
The animals are depicted by their silhouettes and are predominantly painted in black. The fish artwork painted on the police sentry box uses translucent paint.

== Interpretation ==
The series was created by Banksy to cheer up the British public during a period of bleak news headlines when "light has often been harder to spot than shade" as reported by The Guardian. Banksy hoped that the "uplifting works cheer people with a moment of unexpected amusement, as well as to gently underline the human capacity for creative play, rather than for destruction and negativity". Banksy's organisation Pest Control Office has said that "recent theorising about the deeper significance of each new image has been way too involved".

== List of works ==
Map of locations

List of works
Date	Image	Location	Description
5 August		Near Kew Bridge, Richmond 51.48538°N 0.28712°W	A goat with falling rubble on a wall The artwork was removed in February 2025 by a specialist company in preparation for essential work on the building which is owned by Boss & Co. gunmakers.
6 August		Corner of Edith Grove and Edith Terrace, Chelsea 51.48245°N 0.18242°W	Two elephants in the bricked up windows of a house.
7 August		Brick Lane 51.52307°N 0.07151°W	Three monkeys on a railway bridge. Removed by Transport for London in December.
8 August		Rye Lane, Peckham 51.46737°N 0.06667°W	A howling wolf on a satellite dish above a shop. The BBC reported the dish was not believed to have been in situ before the creation of the work. The dish was subsequently apparently stolen by three men in masks. The Metropolitan Police said they had reports of a "stolen satellite dish containing artwork". No arrests have been made. An eyewitness said that a man scaled the roof of the shop on a ladder and removed the dish while two other men watched the ladder. After the men saw the eyewitness, they kicked him and tried to throw his mobile phone on the roof, but it hit a tree.
9 August		Pretoria Avenue, Walthamstow 51.58428°N 0.03438°W	A pair of pelicans above the sign for Bonners Fish Bar, a fish and chip shop
10 August		Edgware Road, Cricklewood 51.5631°N 0.22232°W	A big cat of the genus Panthera stretching on an unused advertising hoarding. The hoarding was later dismantled and stored in a yard waiting for Banksy to claim it or "it'll go in a skip" and was removed due to the possibility of the billboard becoming unsafe if it had have been taken. The billboard had originally been intended to be removed on 12 August. Police had asked for the artwork to be covered as it was attracting crowds on a busy road. The owner of the billboard told police that he would give the work to an art gallery.
11 August		Ludgate Hill, City of London 51.51411°N 0.10289°W	Piranha fish swimming within a City of London Police sentry box. The sentry box was built in the 1990s and is owned by the City of London Corporation. Detective Chief Inspector Andy Spooner of the City of London Police said that they were " ... aware of criminal damage to a City of London Police box in Ludgate Hill" and that the police were liaising with the City of London Corporation. The work was then moved to Guildhall Yard, before being acquired by the Museum of London. Piranhas will reappear at the in 2026 as part of a $280 million relocation project at the London Museum.
12 August		Westmoor Street, Charlton 51.49284°N 0.03775°E	A rhinoceros on a wall, appearing to mount an abandoned Nissan Micra with a traffic cone on its bonnet. The work was marked with a white dollar symbol and letter V tag by a 'random youth' shortly after its creation.
13 August		London Zoo, Regent's Park 51.53575°N 0.15572°W	A gorilla lifting one of the shutters at the zoo entrance to release a sea lion and birds with other animals looking out from inside. It is the final image in the series. The zoo later removed the original for safekeeping and replaced it with a replica.

== See also ==
- List of works by Banksy
