= Simon Egan =

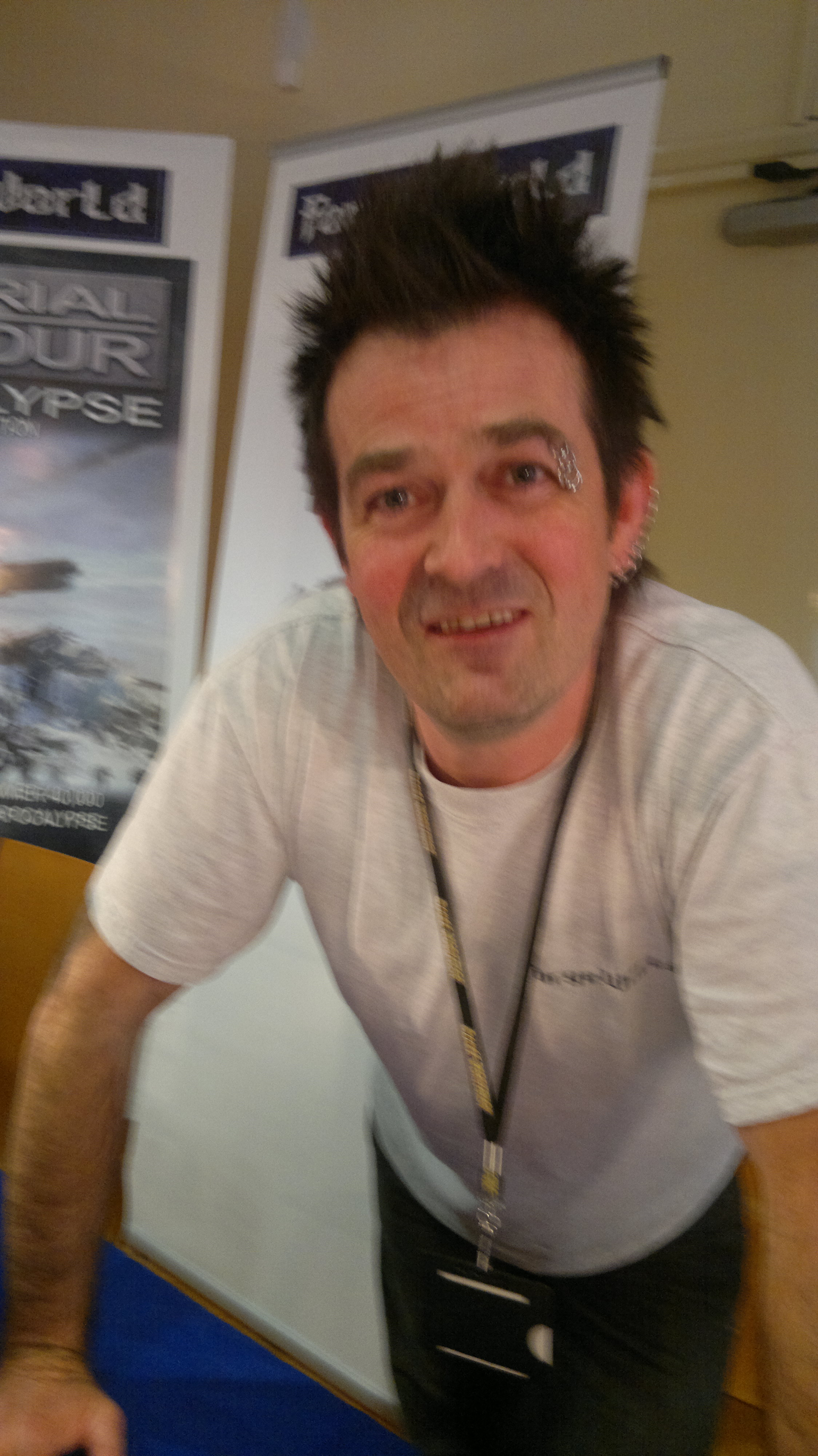
- Born: Simon Egan
- Occupation(s): Designer and Sculptor

Simon Egan is a designer and sculptor for Forge World, a subsidiary of Games Workshop. He is a sculptor in the miniature wargaming hobby and lives in the UK near Nottingham. He produces many of the Forge World miniature figures which can be used in the Games Workshop game systems: Warhammer Fantasy Battles and Warhammer 40,000. Egan has worked for Forge World since approximately 1996 when he started to work for Forge World part-time; at that time he was still working for other companies and his own company; he joined Forge World full-time shortly after.

== Figures and miniatures ==
Egan's contribution to Forge World's output of large scale figures and busts, which were not meant for gameplay, was significant and included the large model of Abbadon. Most of these figures are of the 75mm scale - at this scale, a model of an average sized human male is 75mm from the soles of the feet to the eyes - but they do vary.

Egan's miniatures intended for game play are in the 28mm scale - at this scale a model of an average sized human male is 28mm from the soles of the feet to the eyes. Most of Egan's figures are character miniatures, which tend to "stretch" the scale a little, so that the character miniatures stand out a little. He has stated that 54mm would be his ideal scale to work in, and that he expressed an interest in working on the figures for the specialist game Inquisitor when that range was being produced but that he was unable to.

Egan is well known for his work on the Horus Heresy character series, including many of the Forge World Primarchs. He has appeared on their YouTube channel "Forge World Visual Feed" talking about each project and the methods he used to design the miniatures.

== See also ==
- Games Workshop
- Miniature figure
