= Depictions of Elizabeth II by Banksy =

Artwork by Banksy

Weapons of Mass Distraction (2001)

Monkey Queen (2003)

Queen Ziggy (2012)

Over the years, the graffiti artist Banksy produced a series of signed and unsigned screenprints and artwork featuring Elizabeth II.

== Weapons of Mass Distraction (2001) ==
Originally made in 2001 as a promotional image for Banksy's website, Weapons of Mass Distraction mimics the traditional royal portrait style. The piece features 16 repeated images of Queen Elizabeth II wearing a gas mask, arranged and perforated like functional postage stamps.

== Monkey Queen (2003) ==
Banksy's Monkey Queen is an inflammatory portrait of Queen Elizabeth II. The monkey is pictured in the Queen's jewels and her coiffed hair, in front of a mod-style target background. The work was released as a series of 150 signed and 600 unsigned screenprints. A version of the work sold for £62,750 at Bonham's Banksy Online Sale in 2021

== Queen Ziggy (2012) ==
To coincide with the Diamond Jubilee of Elizabeth II, Banksy stencilled a picture of her as Ziggy Stardust, showing her with a jagged red stripe. The graffiti first appeared on Upper Maudlin Street in the city of Bristol.
