= Flower Thrower =

Mural in Palestine by artist Banksy

- Artist: Banksy
- Year: 2003

The Flower Thrower, Flower Bomber, Rage, or Love is in the Air is a 2003 stencil mural in Beit Sahour in the West Bank by the graffiti artist Banksy, depicting a masked man throwing a bunch of flowers. It is considered one of Banksy's most iconic works; the image has been widely replicated.

It was inspired by images of 1960s protests, such as Bruno Barbey photograph of the May 68 protests in France (e.g. his photograph of Boulevard Saint-Germain, 6th arrondissement, Paris, France. May 6, 1968).

An earlier version was originally drawn by Banksy in 1999 and presented at his first exhibition in 2000.

== Studio release ==
Flower Thrower was released as a screenprint edition of 150 signed versions and 600 unsigned versions by the publisher's Pictures on Walls in 2003. The work features the motif of the masked man set on a red background.

The motif was also used overlaid against a red CCCP text in 2003 in an edition of 8 to 10 known as CCCP Love Is in the Air. On 13 July 2023, an example of CCCP Love Is in the Air sold for £53,340 at the "New Now" auction at Phillips auction house, London.

== See also ==
- List of works by Banksy
