= TrustoCorp =

Group of artists based in New York City, USA

- Known for: Street art Graffiti; Sculpture; Satire; Social commentary

TrustoCorp is an artist or a group of artists based in New York City that produce humorous street signs and product labels, which can be found in New York City, San Francisco, San Diego, and Miami.

Internationally their signs have been seen in Newcastle-Upon-Tyne, United Kingdom.

Street sign art by TrustoCorp
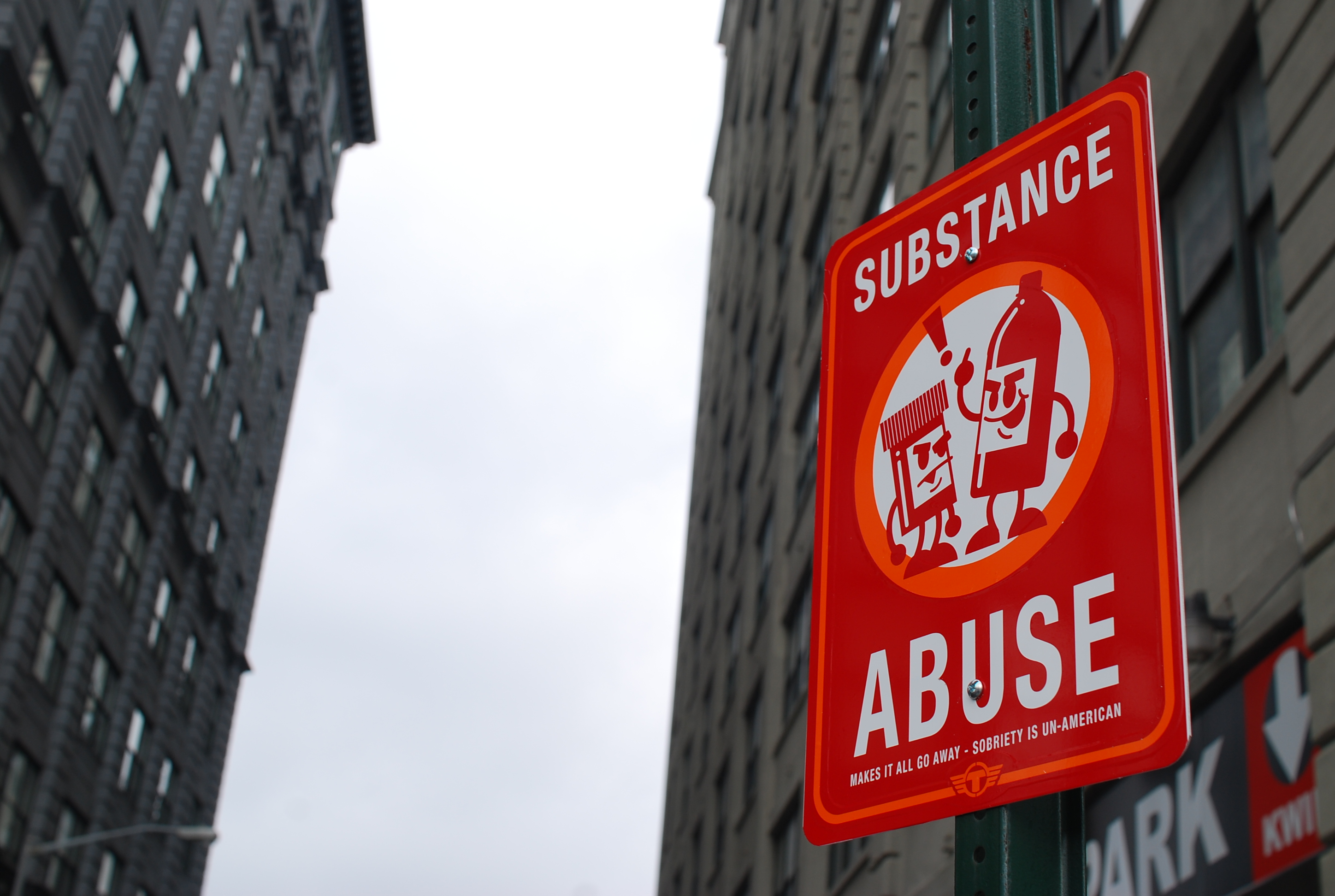

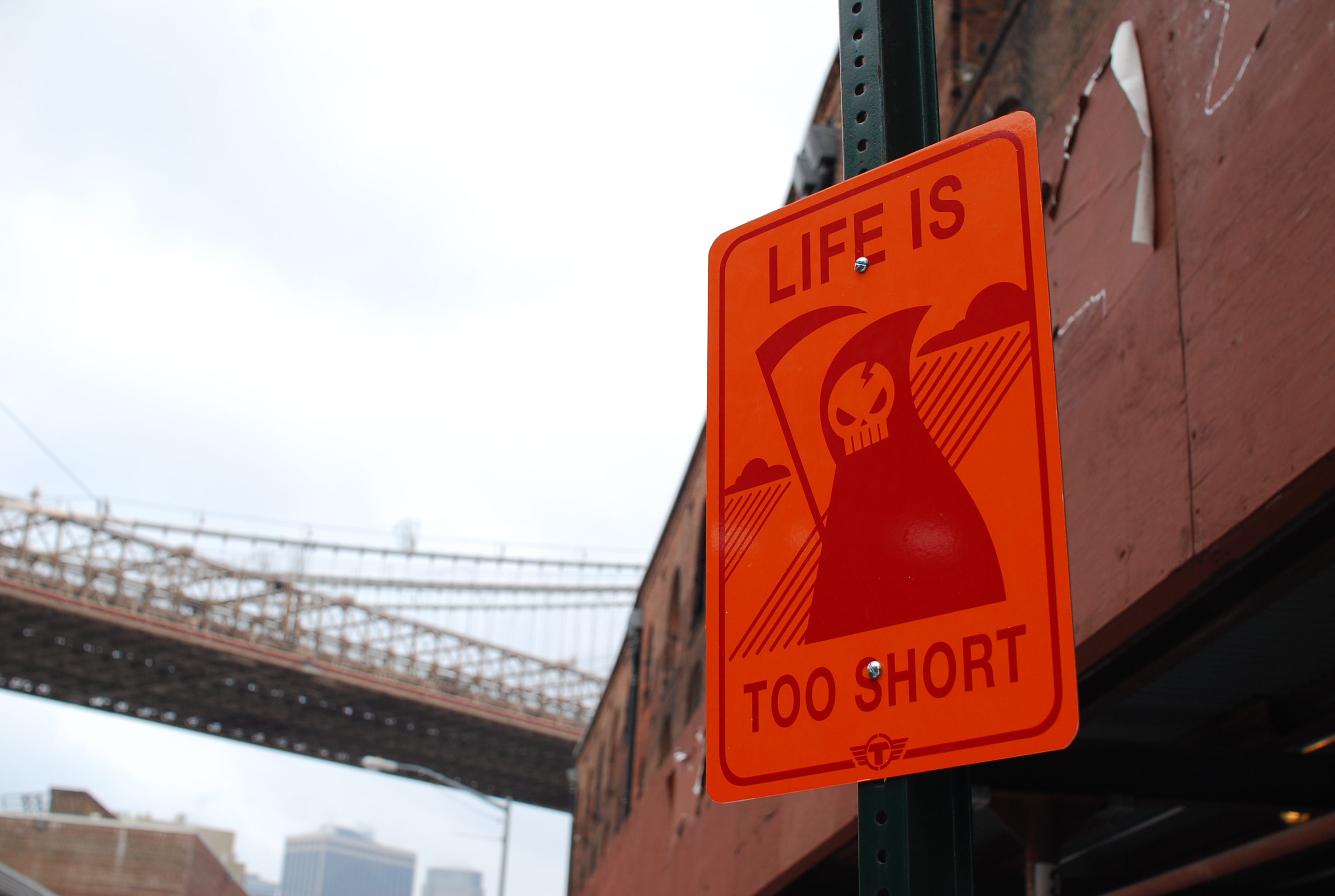
