= Forgive Us Our Trespassing =

Work by Banksy in Salt Lake City, Utah, U.S.

- Artist: Banksy
- Medium: Graffiti
- Location: Salt Lake City, Utah, U.S.

Forgive Us Our Trespassing is a piece by graffiti artist Banksy depicting a kneeling boy with a spray-painted halo. The image can be found on a wall in Salt Lake City, Utah. In 2010, the image was distributed in the form of posters to promote the artist's film Exit Through the Gift Shop.

In March 2010, an official large-format version of the artwork was displayed at London Bridge Station in a collaboration between Banksy and Don't Panic. Transport for London gave permission for this artwork to be hung only if the original image was altered to remove the yellow dripping spray paint halo, so as to not encourage graffiti. The print exhibited but removed within 48 hours after the halo was repaired by "either Banksy or one of his people”. Only one large-format poster of Forgive Us Our Trespassing now remains in existence.

== See also ==
- List of works by Banksy
