= Turf War (Banksy) =

Art exhibition by Banksy

"Turf War" was the first major exhibition by artist Banksy, staged in a warehouse on Kingsland Road in London's East End in 2003.

== Description ==
The exhibition was held in an East London warehouse over several days in July 2003, and featured painted animals, including pigs in police colours, sheep in "concentration camp stripes", and a cow with Andy Warhol's face. The New Yorker described the show as "a Barnumesque spectacle, staged at a secret location", and noted the inclusion of a portrait of Queen Elizabeth II as a chimpanzee. The show also displayed vandalized classic oil paintings. The exhibition was partly sponsored by the fashion brand Puma, who produced collaborative t-shirts and sneakers featuring 'Turf War' branding.

The exhibition's location was not revealed until one day before it began. "Turf War" marked Banksy's first gallery show in the United Kingdom.

== Reception ==
Banksy biographer Will Ellsworth-Jones regards "Turf War" as Banksy's "breakthrough" exhibition. Artnet said the exhibition was "one of England's best -- and briefest" of the season. The exhibition, which featured live animals, sparked protests by animal rights group. One activist chained herself to the railings surrounding a painted cow, despite the animal's conditions being approved by the Royal Society for the Prevention of Cruelty to Animals. Jamie Oliver attended the exhibition.

In 2014 and 2015, Business Insider's Christian Storm and Jack Sommer mentioned the exhibition in their overviews, "25 of Banksy's Cleverest Works" and "Banksy's most clever works", respectively. Some of the exhibition's artworks were put up for sale by Steve Lazarides in 2018.

== See also ==
- 2003 in art
- List of works by Banksy
