= The Son of a Migrant from Syria =

2015 mural by graffiti artist Banksy

- The mural in 2015
- Artist: Banksy
- Year: 2015
- Type: Mural
- Subject: Steve Jobs
- Location: Calais, France

The Son of a Migrant from Syria is a 2015 mural by graffiti artist Banksy. The mural was located in the Calais jungle, a nickname for the encampment near Calais, France, where migrants lived as they attempted to enter the United Kingdom. The artwork depicts the late Apple co-founder and former CEO Steve Jobs—the son of a Syrian migrant to the United States—as a traveling migrant.

== Background ==
Since the beginning of the European migrant crisis, many people have been fleeing war-torn Syria. Thousands of migrants, mostly from Syria, Afghanistan, and Eritrea, lived in a temporary camp nicknamed the Jungle near Calais, France. Banksy, an English-based artist and political activist, had previously donated pieces of his former installation Dismaland to help construct shelters in the camp.

In December 2015, Banksy revealed he had painted several graffiti works related to the migrant crisis in Syria, including a variation of Théodore Géricault's painting The Raft of the Medusa, depicting migrants on a raft waving towards a nearby luxury yacht. The Son of a Migrant from Syria depicts Steve Jobs wearing a black polo neck and round glasses. He is standing while one hand holds a bag of his belongings over his shoulder and the other his original Macintosh computer. Jobs' depiction is derived from a 2006 photograph taken by Albert Watson's which was later used on the cover of Walter Isaacson's 2011 biography Steve Jobs.

In a rare public statement Banksy, said: "We're often led to believe migration is a drain on the country's resources, but Steve Jobs was the son of a Syrian migrant. Apple is the world's most profitable company, it pays over $7bn a year in taxes – and it only exists because they allowed in a young man from Homs."

Using Jobs as a representation of Syrian migrants became popular after a September 2015 tweet by David Galbraith, a technology professional, included a photograph of Jobs with the caption "A Syrian migrants' child." Jobs' biological father, Abdulfattah "John" Jandali, was a student from an elite family in Homs who met Jobs' mother, Joanne Schieble, while pursuing a PhD at the University of Wisconsin. He was adopted a few months after his birth by a couple from California. According to Isaacson, Jobs had little interest in his Syrian heritage. Isaacson stated: "When the Middle East would come up in conversation, the topic did not engage him or evoke his typical strong opinions, even after Syria was swept up in the 2011 Arab Spring uprisings."

== Reception ==
Esquire's Matt Miller said the artwork was a "powerful statement" and "captured Jobs' origin story." Memphis Barker of The Independent praised visual aspects of the artwork, but criticized using Jobs as a representation of refugees and that the mural needed a footnote: "The idea that 'there might be a Steve Jobs' among those living in the Jungle should be washed quickly away. It is pat. It is besides the point. Better treatment and faster asylum procedures are owed to the people in the Jungle because they are people; some saintly, some less so; some business-minded, some illiterate." Wired's Issie Lapowsky shared a similar view. She described the mural as "poignant" and that Banksy raising awareness of conditions in the Jungle was "worth something." But also added "I hope the world will rally to help the millions of refugees who are in need simply because they are in need, and not because they may someday invent the next iPhone." Ashley Carman of The Verge said "While the sentiment and effort to make people care about the refugee crisis certainly warrants applause, it's also worth noting that Jobs rejected his birth parents as anything more than a biological relationship."

Calais city authorities installed protective glass panels over The Son of a Migrant from Syria and Banksy's other nearby murals. Mayor Natacha Bouchart said the murals provided the city with an opportunity and that it is "very good, and it has a message." In January 2016, The Son of a Migrant from Syria was defaced when vandals smashed the protective glass case and sprayed graffiti over the mural.

== See also ==
- List of works by Banksy
- List of works by Banksy that have been damaged or destroyed
- List of artistic depictions of Steve Jobs
