= Creative Folkestone Artworks =

Art exhibition in Folkestone, England

Folkestone’s outdoor public art exhibition – Folkestone Artworks – is the UK’s largest urban outdoor contemporary art exhibition, consisting of 74 contemporary artworks by 46 artists in scenic locations around the town and its coastline. Artworks include those by Lubaina Himid, Tracey Emin, Yoko Ono and Antony Gormley. Folkestone Artworks is refreshed every three years, as permanent works commissioned for the Folkestone Triennial are incorporated. Folkestone Artworks is maintained and cared for by Creative Folkestone on behalf of the Roger De Haan Charitable Trust.

Commissioned artists and their artworks often respond directly to the town of Folkestone itself and with the specific site in mind, reflecting both the town and its community whilst also reflecting broader themes. Creative Folkestone’s CEO, Alastair Upton notes that the artists “work with the grain of the history and the grain of the land to make something and people can come and read that but of course they’re artists so there is a universality".

Notable artworks reflecting this ethos include Sol Calero’s Casa Anacaona, built by the artist working with members of the community as part of the Creative Folkestone Triennial 2017. Lubaina Himid’s Jelly Mould Pavilion, a public pavilion commissioned in 2007, reveals the town’s history with themes of universality whilst also offering shade, opportunities for conversation and invites contemplation on a sandy beach looking out to the sea. Pilar Quinteros's Janus Fortress Folkestone artwork launched in May 2021 is part of the 2021 Folkestone Triennial, 'The Plot' and England's Creative Coast.

Some of the artworks are more of a personal nature, including Tracey Emin’s Baby Things - a seven-part collection of bronze sculptures, including a teddy bear that sits on a platform at Folkestone Central railway station. Mark Wallinger’s Folk Stones reflects a more universal theme, consisting of 19,240 numbered stones, the exact number of soldiers killed on the first day of the Battle of the Somme in 1916.

A volunteer-led project, Online Placemaking, resulted in all 72 Artworks being geo-located on Google Maps for the first time in March 2021.

== Artists and Artworks ==
Artist	Artwork	Date of Triennial/ Installation
Adam Chodzko	Pyramid	2008
Christian Boltanski	The Whispers	2008
Mark Dion	The Mobile Gull Appreciation Unit	2008
Mark Wallinger	Folk Stones	2008
Nathan Colley	Heaven is a Place Where Nothing Ever Happens	2008
Pae White	Barking Rocks	2008
Patrick Tuttofuoco	FOLKESTONE	2008
Richard Wilson	18 Holes	2008
Richard Wentworth	Racinated	2008
Tracey Emin	Baby Things	2008
A K Dolven	Out of Tune	2011
Cornelia Parker	Folkestone Mermaid	2011
Cristina Iglesias	Towards the Sound of Wilderness	2011
Hamish Fulton	31 Walks from Water to Water 1971-2010 Made on Western Europe	2011
Paloma Varga Weisz	Rug People	2011
Ruth Ewan	We Could Have Been Anything That We Wanted to Be	2011
Spencer Finch	The Colour of Water	2011
Tonico Lemos Auad	Carrancas	2011
Diane Dever and Jonathan Wright	Pent Houses	2014
Ian Hamilton Finlay	Weather is Third to Place and Time	2014
Jyll Bradley	Green/Light (for M.R.)	2014
Michael Sailstorfer	Folkestone Digs	2014
Muf Architecture/Art	Payers Park	2014
Pablo Bronstein	Beach Hut in the Style of Nicholas Hawksmoor	2014
rootoftwo	Whithervanes: A Neurotic Early Worrying System (NEWS)	2014
Sarah Staton	Steve	2014
Strange Cargo	The Luckiest Place on Earth	2014
Tim Etchells	Is Why The Place?	2014
Will Kwan	Apparatus #9 (The China Watchers Oxford University, MI6, HSBC)	2014
Yoko Ono	SKYLADDER	2014
Yoko Ono	Earth Peace	2014
Amalia Pica	Souvenir	2017
Antony Gormley	Another Time 1999-2013	2017
Bill Woodrow	The Ledge	2017
Bob and Roberta Smith	FOLKESTONE IS AN ART SCHOOL	2017
David Shrigley	Lamp Post (as remembered)	2017
Diane Dever and The Decorators	Customs House, Urban Room Folkestone	2017
Gary Woodley	Impingement No. 66 ‘Cube Circumscribed by Tetrahedron - Tetrahedron Circumscribed by Cube’	2017
Jonathan Wright	Fleet on Foot	2017
Marc Schmitz + Dolger Ser-Od	Sire	2017
Michael Craig-Martin	Folkestone Lightbulb	2017
Richard Woods	Holiday Home	2017
Rigo 23	Through the Glassworks, Earth’s Oldest Satellite, Me and You, Some in Fewture 1990-2017	2017
Sinta Tantra	1947	2017
Sol Calero	Casa Anacaona	2017
Studio Ben Allen	The Clearing	2017
