= Creative Folkestone Quarterhouse =

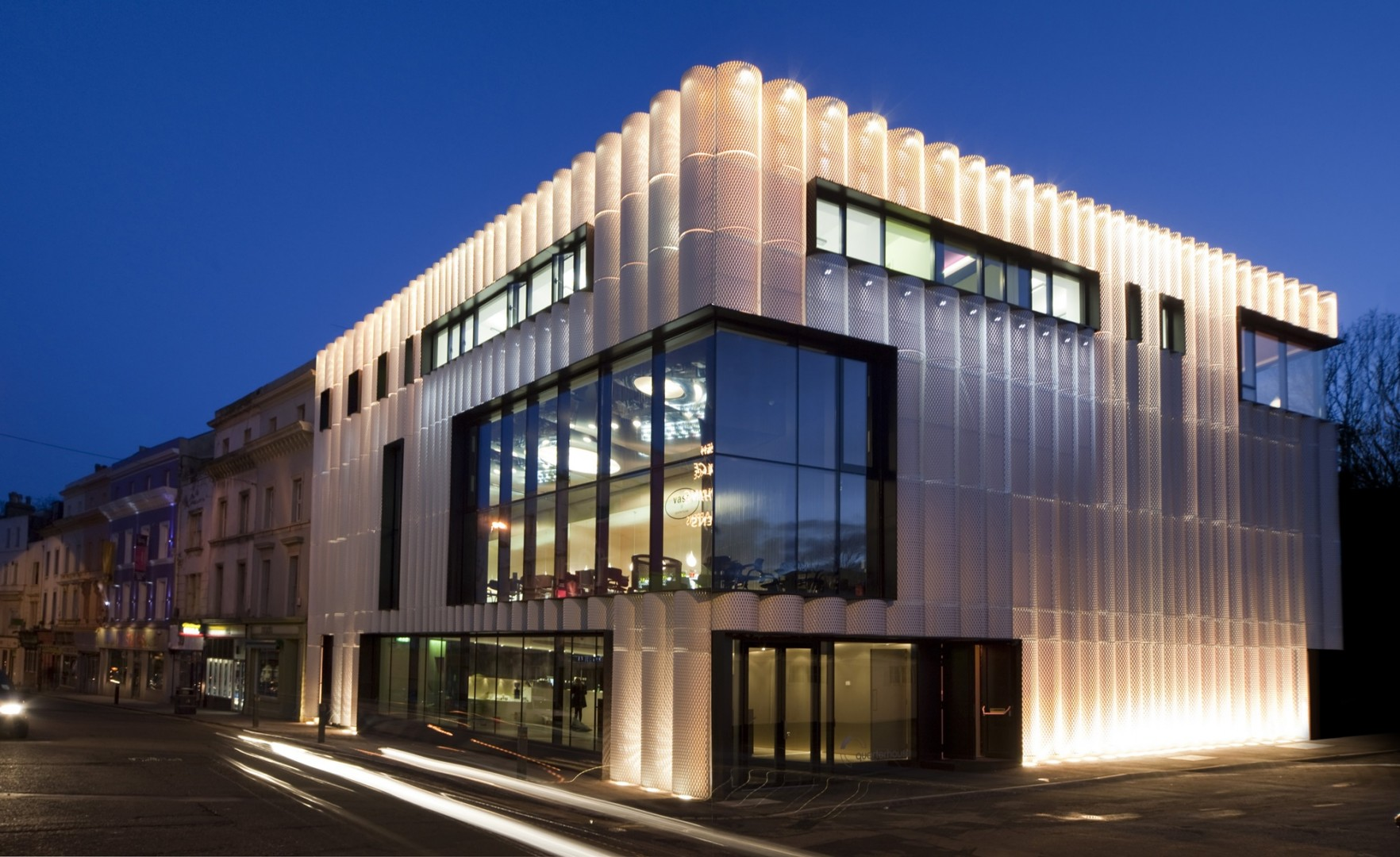
- External view of Creative Folkestone Quarterhouse

General information
- Status: Completed
- Type: Performing Arts & Business Centre
- Location: 49 Tontine St, Folkestone CT20 1JT
- Completed: 2009
- Cost: £3.8 million (£4 million funding)

Technical details
- Size: 1550 m²

Design and construction
- Architects: Alison Brooks Architects Ltd, project architect Dominic McKenzie
- Structural engineer: Akera Engineers
- Quantity surveyor: GPM partnership
- Main contractor: D.J. Ellis Construction Ltd.
- Awards: RIBA Stirling Prize Midlist 2009, RIBA National Award 2009, RIBA South East Regional Award 2009

Website
- https://www.creativefolkestone.org.uk/folkestone-quarterhouse/

Creative Folkestone Quarterhouse (also known as Quarterhouse) is a performance and exhibition space in Folkestone, Kent, England. It is used for activities including theatre, dance, music, film, comedy, family shows, and live screenings from organisations including National Theatre and Royal Opera House. The venue is also home to numerous festivals, including Creative Folkestone Book Festival, Normal? Festival of the Brain, and SALT Festival of the Sea and Environment.

== Building ==
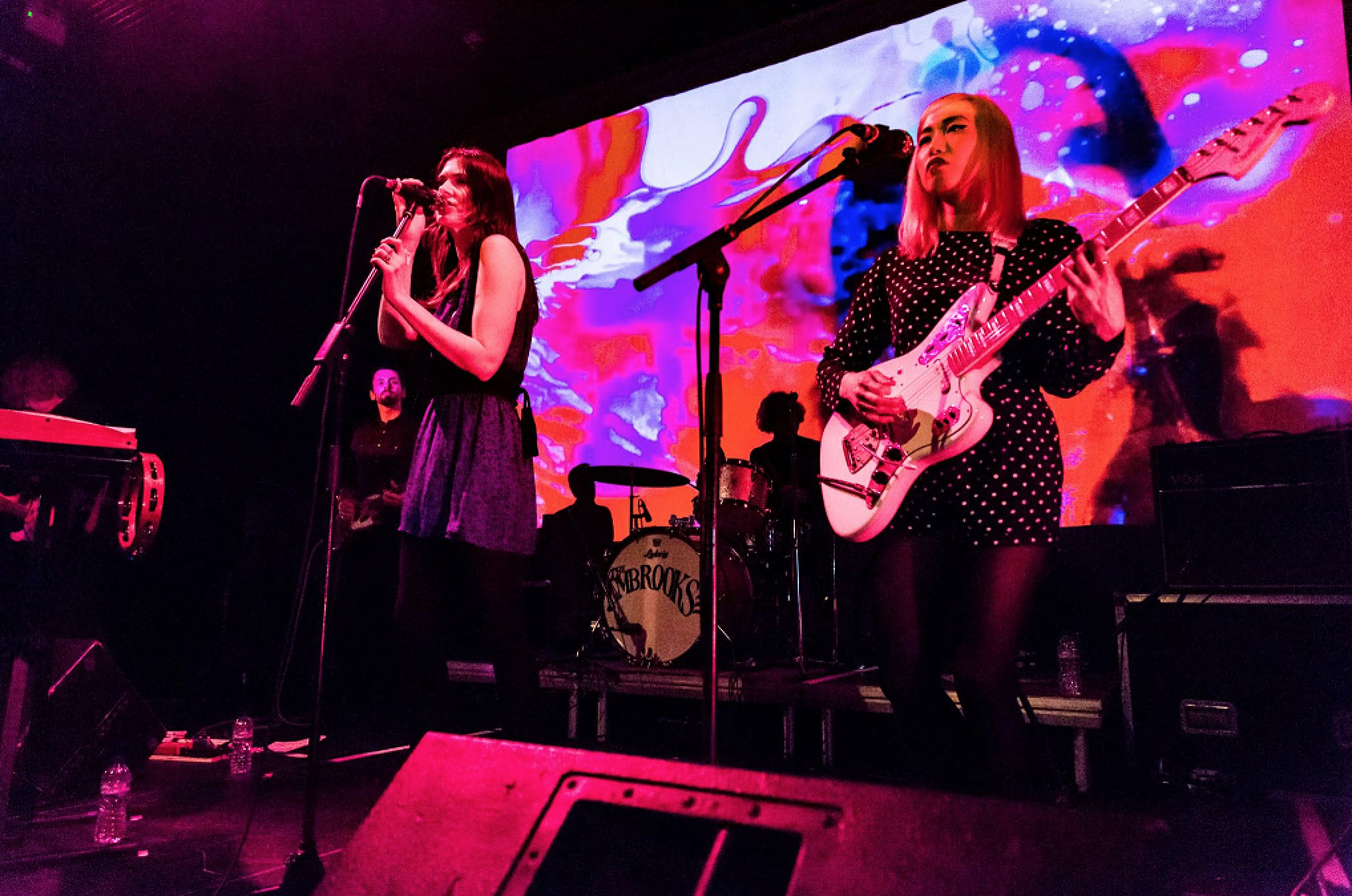
Quarterhouse

=== Design ===
The Quarterhouse was the first built part of a masterplan for the Folkestone harbour area produced by architects Foster and Partners. It was envisioned as a link between Tontine Street and the town centre. Kent County Council provided a £3.5 million grant for the Quarterhouse. The South East England Development Agency (SEEDA) provided a further £500,000.

In December 2005, Creative Folkestone selected a design by Alison Brooks Architects (ABA) for a building to serve as Folkestone’s “living room”. This was the culmination of a two-stage national competition to select a design of the Quarterhouse.

=== Planning constraints ===
In August 2007, a hearing at Shepway District Council Committee culminated in a unanimous vote to award planning permission for a new building at the site, previously occupied by a builder's yard. Permission was granted despite a recommendation by the council's planning department for the exterior mesh cladding to be removed.

The building is located in Folkestone Leas and Bayle Conservation area. It contains two structurally and acoustically isolated boxes – an inner one and an outer one. This prevents noise travelling out of and into the building. Inspired by scallop shells, the fluted mesh cladding is backlit at night bookending a curved east façade of Georgian buildings on Tontine Street.

The design was further developed through 2006, with on-site work starting in early summer 2007. Construction was completed in February 2009.

=== Facilities ===
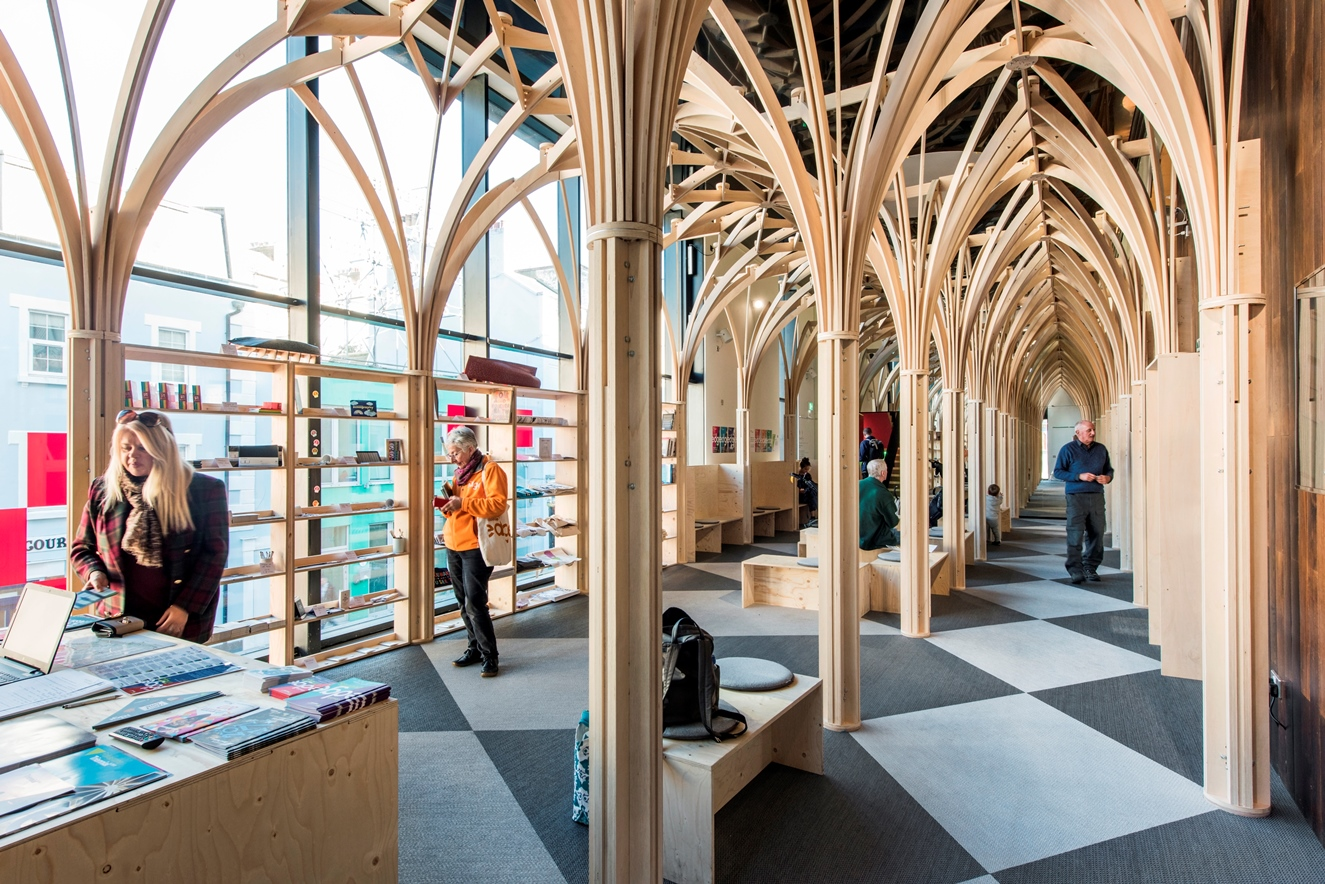
The Clearing

The Quarterhouse comprises:

- a 220-seat, 490-standing multi-purpose auditorium. The brief had called for 250 seats, but this was reduced due to space constraints
- ground floor foyer and exhibition space
- first floor cafe/bar
- a top floor business enterprise centre – including 13 small offices of approximately 15 square metres each, shared reception and meeting room

In addition to its auditorium, Quarterhouse houses Creative Folkestone's administrative offices and the Creative Folkestone Triennial.

== Artworks ==
Quarterhouse is also home to three public artworks in the Creative Folkestone Artworks collection, installed during successive Creative Folkestone Triennials. Yoko Ono’s Skyladder, installed for the 2014 Triennial, is an ‘instruction’ work, an invitation to the people of Folkestone, exhibited in the Quarterhouse Bar.

On the first floor, London-based architects Studio Ben Allen installed The Clearing as part of the 2017 Triennial. Comprising 16 vertical gothic wooden tree-like forms, creating a cathedral-like visitor centre for the café bar, it is now a permanent part of the Creative Folkestone Artworks collection.

On the roof, there is one of the five sculptures called Pent House by artists Diane Dever and Jonathan Wright.

== Awards ==
- RIBA Stirling Prize Midlist 2009
- RIBA National Award 2009
- RIBA South East Regional Award 2009
- Alison Brooks won the AJ100 Contribution to the Profession Award in 2017
