= Folkestone Triennial =

Arts festival in Folkestone, England

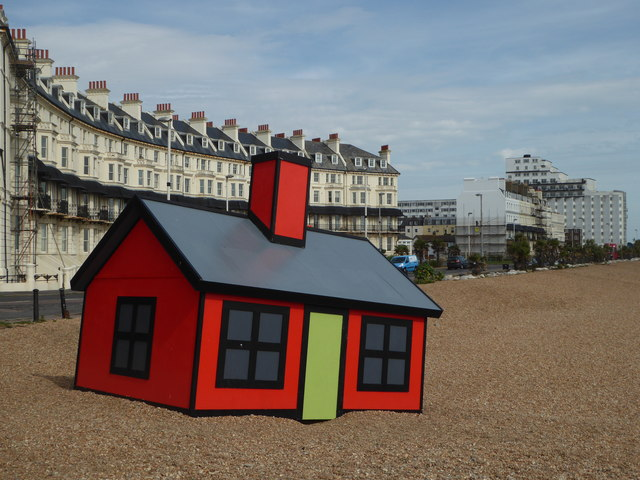
- Holiday Home by Richard Woods at the 2017 Folkestone Triennial
- Status: Active
- Genre: Arts festival
- Frequency: Triannually
- Location: Folkestone, Kent
- Coordinates: 51.081°N 1.166°E
- Country: England
- Years active: since June 2008
- Most recent: 2021
- Next event: 19 July - 19 October 2025
- Attendance: 51,000 in 2008; 103,000 in 2011; 135,000 in 2014, 150,000 in 2017
- Website: http://www.folkestonetriennial.org.uk

The Creative Folkestone Triennial is an arts festival held every three years in Folkestone, Kent, England.

Site-specific artworks are commissioned for what are often unusual locations around the town, a number of works remaining in place permanently after the end of each festival as part of the permanent Creative Folkestone Artworks exhibition. The 2021 Triennial will be the first to break the usual three-year cycle following a postponement from its original 2020 dates due to the global COVID-19 pandemic.

Artists who have exhibited at the Triennial include Lubaina Himid, Tracey Emin, Cornelia Parker, Martin Creed, Myles Stephens, Emma Hart, Sir Anthony Gormley, Andy Goldsworthy and Bob and Roberta Smith. During 2014, graffiti artist Banksy contributed Art Buff to the town, announcing that it was "Part of the Folkestone triennial. Kind of."

The Folkestone Triennial was curated by Andrea Schlieker in 2008 and 2011, and Lewis Biggs in 2014, 2017 and 2021.

== Community engagement ==
Announcing the 2021 artists, curator Lewis Biggs described the Triennial's connection with Folkestone by saying "we will treat the town as a gallery", adding it "has to be about the context and history of Folkestone".

Community engagement and involvement with the development with the artworks is a key feature of the Triennial, including HoyCheong Wong's 2017 piece working with Folkestone's Islamic Cultural Centre - a relationship which will be extended for Wong's collaboration with the local Islamic community, artist Simon Davenport and architect Shahed Saleem/Makespace for the 2021 Triennial.

Other pieces commissioned for 2021 with strong elements of community engagement include those commissioned through Pioneering Places East Kent and funded by Arts Council England and National Lottery Heritage Fund inspired by the former site of Folkestone's Ship Street Gasworks. These include Jacqueline Donachie's piece inspired by a social club which remained on the derelict site long after it ceased production while Morag Myerscough is designing a gateway or 'welcome pavilion' for the former gasworks site.

== Educational programme ==
The Triennial's significant educational programme has been growing since its first inception in the 2014 edition, which involved over 18,000 learners across more than 70 schools and 50 community groups. In 2017 this was further developed to 202 talks, tours, workshops and conferences through a schools, community and further and higher education programme. In 2021 the Triennial will expand its footprint online through virtual tours and video content.

== Economic impact ==
According to the organiser, the direct and indirect impact of the Folkestone Triennial was worth more £65 million in 2014, including £2m in grants and donations, £2.7 million in visitor spend and £59 million in media value.

== Reception ==
An independent survey was conducted after the 2014 Triennial, finding that 89.8% of visitors gave a good or excellent rating for the artworks; 96.3% rated the Folkestone Triennial as good or excellent. In 2014, the Triennial attracted 119 articles in regional, national and international media, as well as 14 items of radio or television coverage and over 1.6 billion hits across more than 200 web articles, generating a combined media value in excess of £59m.

== Themes ==
=== # 1 Tales of Time and Space - Folkestone Triennial 2008 ===
Inspired by Folkestone's past, present and future the inaugural Triennial saw work displayed in Folkestone's beach, harbour, parks, marine promenade and historic buildings.

Artists included Christian Boltanski, Tacita Dean, Jeremy Deller, Tracey Emin, Langlands and Bell, Heather and Ivan Morison, Mark Wallinger and Richard Wilson. Works retained and still included in the Creative Folkestone Artworks collection include Tracey Emin's series of works, Baby Things, Mark Wallinger's Folk Stones, Patrick Tuttofuoco's FOLKESTONE, Richard Wilson's 18 Holes, Adam Chozko's Pyramid, Christian Boltanski's The Whispers, Pae White's Barking Rocks and Richard Wentworth's series, Racinated.

=== #2 A Million Miles from Home - Folkestone Triennial 2011 ===
In 2011, the theme highlighted an outward-looking facet of Folkestone and the town's place as "a gateway to other cultures, politics, environmental warnings and the fundamental notion of how our shores contribute to our sense of place and belonging". Notable highlights included Cornelia Parker's Folkestone Mermaid - her own version of Copenhagen's 'Little Mermaid', with a local woman acting as a model for the sculpture. Parker's piece can still be viewed overlooking Folkestone's Sunny Sands as part of the permanent Creative Folkestone Artworks collection dotted across the town, along with works by Richard Wentworth, Hamish Fulton, Tonica Lemos Auad, A K Dolven, Paloma Varga Weisz, Ruth Ewan, Spencer Finch and Christina Iglesias.

Additional artists presenting hailed from Algeria, Morocco, Kosovo, Israel, Egypt, Guyana, India, Brazil, Denmark, Spain, Germany and the USA.

=== #3 Lookout - Folkestone Triennial 2014 ===
While Andy Goldsworthy was seen by some as the "headline act", Berlin-based artist Michael Sailstorfer attracted most media attention by hiding £10,000 of 24-carat gold bars on Folkestone beach, with some of the 30 bars yet to be found despite the rush to dig. Artists with works still featured in the permanent Creative Folkestone Artworks collection include Cézanne Charles and John Marshall (a.k.a. rootoftwo), Pablo Bronstein, Diane Dever and Jonathan Wright, Strange Cargo, muf Architecture, Ian Hamilton Finlay, Tim Etchells, Sarah Staton, Will Kwan and Yoko Ono, who contributed two pieces - Earth Peace and Skyladder 2014.

==== Banksy's Art Buff ====
Renowned graffiti artist, Banksy, gatecrashed the 2014 Triennial, painting a mural called Art Buff on the side of Palace Amusements in Payers Park in October 2014. His website announced that the mural was "Part of the Folkestone triennial. Kind of". It was soon vandalised with the addition of a phallic symbol, spray painted onto the previously empty plinth in the artwork. It was then flown to the US to be sold two months after its creation. In September 2015, a London judge – Richard Arnold – ruled that Banksy's mural Art Buff must be delivered to Creative Foundation (now known as Creative Folkestone) from storage in New York, where it was being kept by the curator of a December 2014 exhibition of Banksy's works in Miami, at which it failed to sell. It was finally returned to Folkestone in 2020, inspiring Creative Folkestone's celebration of creativity in the community, The Plinth.

=== #4 double edge - Folkestone Triennial 2017 ===
The 'double edge' theme in 2017 "plays with ambiguity, dialogue and deceit," according to the curator, Lewis Biggs. Audiences were tasked with exploring why the world is the way that it is, how it might be, and how change is always possible. Issues explored included borders; thresholds; margins; the periphery; gateways and the liminal.

Notable works in the 2017 Triennial which still reside as pieces in the Folkestone Artworks collection include Antony Gormley's Another Time XXI, Richard Woods's Holiday Home sequence, featuring model second homes by the sea, Bob and Roberta Smith's Folkestone is an Art School and Marc Schmitz and Dolgor Ser-Od's giant shell-cum-gramophone piece, Siren, which was described as an example of a work that "seems to have fallen to Earth on the East Cliff". Other remaining pieces in the Folkestone Artworks collection from the 2017 collection include works by Amalia Pica, Rigo 23, Diane Dever and the Decorators, Sol Calero, Michael Craig-Martin, Lubaina Himid, Gary Woodley, Bill Woodrow, David Shrigley and Studio Ben Allen, whose architectural piece, The Clearing, is still a feature of the first floor bar at Folkestone's Quarterhouse.

Additional artists exhibiting at Triennial 2017 included Alex Hartley, Emily Peasgood, Nomeda and Gediminas Urbonas and HoyCheong Wong.

=== #5 The Plot - Folkestone Triennial 2021 ===
The theme in 2021 is 'The Plot', subtitled 'Urban myths and their relation to verifiable realities: the gap between the story and the materiality'. The first artwork to be unveiled for the 2021 Triennial was Rana Begum's brightly painted new beach huts, replacing rundown chalets along the coast between Folkestone and Sandgate.

Interactive sculptures - Skating Situations - at the mainline railway viaduct and the Harbour Arm is a collaboration between Turner Prize-Winning collective Assemble and local skateboarders. The event will include 20 outdoor, newly commissioned public artworks by artists including Assemble, Rana Begum, Gilbert & George, Atta Kwami, Pilar Quinteros, and Richard Deacon.

=== #6 How Lies the Land? – Folkestone Triennial 2025 ===
The sixth Folkestone Triennial, titled How Lies the Land?, ran from 19 July to 19 October 2025 and was curated by Sorcha Carey. Eighteen new commissions were installed across Folkestone’s coastal paths, Martello towers and disused buildings.

Notable works included Katie Paterson’s Afterlife, engaging with themes of mortality and ecology; Dorothy Cross’s marble sculpture referencing migration; Cooking Sections’ Ministry of Sewers, which explored urban infrastructure; Laure Prouvost’s giant seabird on the harbour; Sara Trillo’s Bronze Age-inspired Urn Field on East Cliff; and Monster Chetwynd’s giant salamander. Other participating artists included Céline Condorelli, Emeka Ogboh and Jennifer Tee.

== Funders ==
2014 supported by The Roger De Haan Charitable Trust, Arts Council England, the Folkestone Estate, Kent County Council and Shepway District Council.

2017 sponsored by Saga and supported by The Roger De Haan Charitable Trust and Arts Council England along with Kent County Council, Shepway District Council and the Oak Foundation.

2021 supported by The Roger De Haan Charitable Trust, Arts Council England, Folkestone & Hythe District Council, Kent County Council, Oak Foundation, Henry Moore Foundation and EU Interreg North Sea Region Cupido.

Individual works are often supported by specific funders: e.g. Pilar Quinteros' piece in 2021 is co-commissioned by England's Creative Coast, Beach Huts by Folkestone and Hythe District Council and 2021 pieces by Jacqueline Donachie, Jacqueline Poncelet and Morag Myserscough have been commissioned through Pioneering Places East Kent and funded by Arts Council England and National Lottery Heritage Fund.
