= Slayer Pavilion =

Slayer Pavilion was an installation art piece by David Dorrell, Melissa Frost, and Mihda Koray. It was seen at the 10th Istanbul Biennial in September 2007. It featured the set of a teenager's room, in the center of which was a dummy representing a boy who had hanged himself. It was referred to as a "look into the world of a Goth-metal teenage boy."

Slayer Pavilion followed in the tradition of Kurt Schwitters and Gregor Schneider, "dispensing with space and time in favour of a non-hierarchical dream space."
