= Galerie Konrad Fischer =

German contemporary art gallery

- Established: 1967
- Location: Platanenstraße 7, Düsseldorf, Germany
- Website: konradfischergalerie.de

The Galerie Konrad Fischer is a German contemporary art gallery. It was founded in 1967 by Dorothee and Konrad Fischer in Düsseldorf, in a disused alley in the center of the city.

== History ==
The gallery's first exhibition presented the work of Carl Andre to European audiences. The gallery has focused on minimal art, conceptual art and arte povera since its founding.

The gallery has exhibited contemporary artists including Bernd and Hilla Becher, Wolfgang Laib, Jim Lambie, Sol LeWitt, Bruce Nauman, Manfred Pernice, Thomas Schütte, Gregor Schneider, Robert Smithson, and Paloma Varga Weisz. Artists who had their first solo exhibitions with him included Richard Long, Hanne Darboven, Lawrence Weiner and On Kawara.

During the 1970’s, the gallery expanded its operations, with spaces in Zurich and Rome (with the Italian art dealer Gian Enzo Sperone). Between 1975 and 1982, Konrad Fischer was a partner in Sperone Westwater Fischer, a New York gallery that later re-branded as Sperone Westwater.

In 2007 the gallery opened an additional space in Berlin. In 2019, it moved to a new space in an old transformer station.

The state of North Rhine-Westphalia acquired 250 works from the estate of the gallery's founders in 2014.

== Artists ==
Konrad Fischer Galerie represents numerous living artists, including:

- Carl Andre
- Giovanni Anselmo
- Guy Ben-Ner
- Daniel Buren
- Tony Cragg
- Edith Dekyndt
- Hans-Peter Feldmann
- Candida Höfer
- Gilbert & George
- Wolfgang Laib
- Jim Lambie
- Richard Long
- Bruce Nauman
- Thomas Ruff
- Gregor Schneider
- Thomas Schütte
- Paloma Varga Weisz

In addition, the gallery manages various artist estates, including:

- Bernd and Hilla Becher
- Marcel Broodthaers
- Stanley Brouwn
- Hanne Darboven
- On Kawara
- Jannis Kounellis
- Sol LeWitt
- Charlotte Posenenske
- Robert Ryman
