= Art Buff =

Graffiti artwork by Banksy

Coordinates: 51.08102°N 1.18169°E

Art Buff is a graffiti artwork by Banksy which was created in Folkestone in 2014, Banksy announcing it as "part of the Folkestone triennial. Kind of". The work depicts a woman wearing headphones and staring at a plinth, upon which rests a patch of painted-out graffiti. The name of the piece is a play on words, "buff" being a slang term for the painting over of graffiti.

Reported on 13 October 2014, Art Buff was vandalized with the spray painting of a penis sitting on top of the plinth.

During early November 2014 Robin Barton and Bankrobber London organized the removal of Art Buff from its Folkestone location following requests from the owners of the wall, and announced plans to put it up for sale in aid of a cancer charity set up in memory of Jimmy Godden. On 27 November 2014, the work was flown to Miami Art Basel to be offered for sale. On 11 September 2015, a British judge ruled that the mural should be returned to its original location in Folkestone. Plans were announced to include the artwork as part of a new building in 2018. It finally returned to Folkestone in 2020 as part of the Creative Quarter's "The Plinth" event.

== See also ==
- List of works by Banksy
