= Silent Agitator =

Sculpture by Ruth Ewan

- The sculpture along the High Line in February 2020
- Artist: Ruth Ewan
- Location: New York City (April 2019 – March 2020)

Silent Agitator is a sculpture by Ruth Ewan. It is currently on display in St Mungo's Square at the University of Glasgow. Based on work by Ralph Chaplin, the art installation features a clock and the text "time to organize" below. The work was inspired by an illustration for the Industrial Workers of the World with the text, "What time is it? Time to organize!"

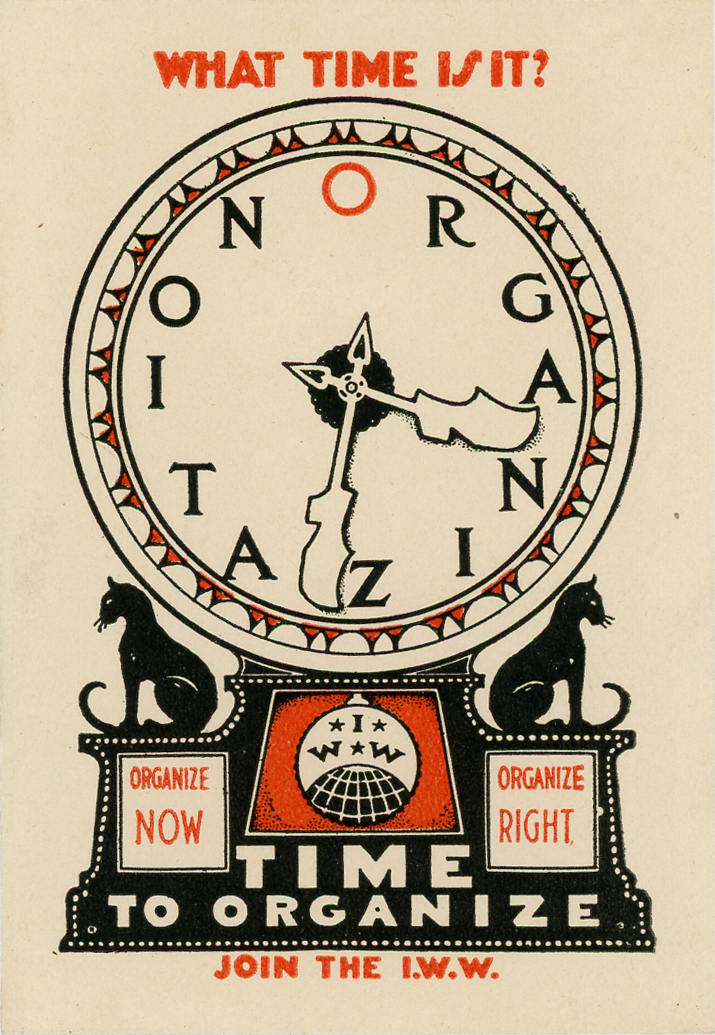
Industrial Workers of the World Silent agitators

The sculpture was installed along Manhattan's High Line, in the U.S. state of New York, from April 2019 to March 2020. In May 2019, Bloomberg's James Tarmy included Silent Agitator in his list of "New York City's Most Instagrammable Public Art (That’s Not the Vessel)". Inspired by the sculpture, Ewan, the Brooklyn's Women's Chorus, the New York City Labor Chorus, and other performers sang "odes to organized labor" on the High Line at 14th Street, in October 2019.
