= Sinta Tantra =

British artist of Balinese descent (born 1979)

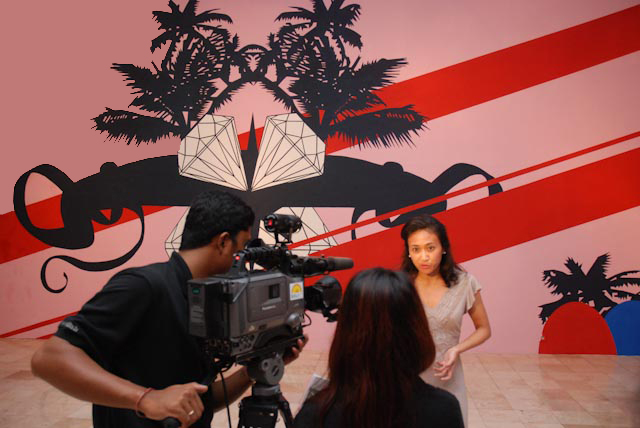
Sinta Tantra being interviewed in Bali. Arsenic Fantasy, 2009, is in the background

Sinta Tantra (born 11 November 1979) is a British artist of Balinese descent. She was born in New York on 11 November 1979, and spent her childhood in Indonesia, America and the UK. She graduated from the Slade School of Fine Art, London, in 2003 and completed her postgraduate degree at Royal Academy of Arts in 2006. In the same year, she was awarded the prestigious Deutsche Bank Award in Fine Art. Highly regarded for her site-specific work in the public realm, she has since undertaken commissions that include the Folkestone Triennial (2017), Songdo Tech City (2016), Liverpool Biennial (2012), The Southbank Centre (2008), and TFL Art on the Underground (2007). She held the inaugural Bridget Riley Fellowship 2016–17 at the British School at Rome, is the recipient of the British Council's International Development Award and was shortlisted for the Jerwood Painting Prize. She lives and works between London and Bali.

Tantra's practice is diverse, ranging from painted canvases, to site-specific sculptural interventions, to large-scale public artworks. She describes her work as 'painting on an architectural scale'. Colour is central to her practice, as a 'material which lies between the language of art and industry'. Her distinctive palette is inspired by her Balinese heritage and childhood holidays: 'I remember things through colour – especially the way in which colours vibrate against each other. I like the idea of ‘colour semiotics’ and the associations one has to particular colours in relationship to either brand or narrative.'

Her work has been described as "exuberant", a "hedonistic celebration of excess and decoration", and her contribution to public art by transforming spaces with "chaotic yet captivating images" has been recognised by collectors and commissioners alike. Her 2010 work Universe of Objects in Archive, Arsenic and Railings praised for lifting the perspective "like the energy of a released spring and pulses horizontally around the room in endless optical trigonometric fugue".

== Early life and education ==
Tantra was born on 11 November 1979, in New York, to Balinese parents. Her father worked in finance, while her mother looked after her and her four older siblings. When Tantra was aged 6, the family relocated to the UK. Tantra has said, 'Like many first generation children whose parents migrated, I could never really identify with being from just one particular place. My work explores my identity and the layering of cultures specific to my own experiences. I am inspired by the colours of Bali, an English Heritage palette and 1980s pop Americana.' After completing a BTEC diploma in Fine Art at Middlesex University in 1999, Tantra took her BA at the Slade School of Fine Art from 2000 to 2003, under the tutor Andrew Stahl, head of Painting. It was here that she met the sculptor Nick Hornby, who she would go on to collaborate with in the future. During her studies, Tantra was introduced to the work of the conceptual artist Sol LeWitt (1928-2007), whose reduction of painting to a 'series of instructions or blueprints' she cites as a ‘huge’ and enduring influence on her practice. Like LeWitt, Tantra's work lies at the intersection between art and architecture, exceeding the confines of the canvas and of the gallery space. Likewise, Tantra cites the Indonesian painter Mochtar Apin (1923-1944) as an inspiration: 'In my work, there are specific elements inspired by Indonesian patterns. These patterns are reduced, distorted or enlarged to such a scale that the viewer becomes submerged in the decoration itself.'

After graduating, Tantra was accepted onto the Royal Academy Fine Art Masters Programme. Her studies were funded by a Paul Smith Postgraduate Scholarship. It was at the RA that Tantra's interest in large-scale artwork in the public realm began. She regards this as a reaction both to the stereotype of female work as modest or decorative. 'Even at art school, painting on canvas didn't really appeal to me- I was more interested in playing with architectural space, injecting colour, line, and form into new environments. Admittedly in the early days, there was also the desire to challenge the gender stereotype, that both men and women could make large scale works.' She describes the expectation of her lecturers and peers that she would create 'something cute and feminine, in small sizes' as fuelling her desire to ‘consistently create abstract and structured paintings’.

== Career ==
Tantra completed her MA in 2006, and that year was awarded the prestigious Deutsche Bank award. She began running a studio space for artists in the London Borough of Camden, organising workshops and community projects. Through her work she made contact with Camden Council, who commissioned her first public art piece, a mural stretching across Regents Park Bridge titled Isokon Dreams (2007). The work was praised by local councillor Flick Rea, who said 'The mural is fantastic. It really brightens the [Regents Park Road] bridge'.

Tantra's early work was composed of intricately cut vinyl and painted designs, featuring vibrant colours and geometric shapes. Her work remains recognisable for its distinctive use of colour and pattern: clean lines, geometric abstraction, a preoccupation with decorative symbols, and a bold and arresting choice of colours. Among her first commissions was a 2006 project for Transport For London's Art on the Underground initiative, for which she produced a vinyl installation at the exit of Piccadilly Circus Station. Other early projects include a large mural and stage for the Saison Poetry Library in the Southbank Centre, titled A Good Time and a Half! (2007). Poet Lemn Sissay described it as an 'incredible piece of work', which 'allows for the full breadth of human experience upon the stage [...] brings the entire world into the library'.

Since then Tantra has gone on to make increasingly ambitious works, including her painting across the length of the DLR Bridge in Canary Wharf titled A Beautiful Sunset Mistaken for a Dawn, which was commissioned by Canary Wharf Group in anticipation of the 2012 Olympics. Other projects include an installation at the Open Eye Gallery as part of the 2012 Liverpool Biennial.

2013 saw the first of a series of collaborative projects with the sculptor Nick Hornby. Collaborative Works was held in the lobby of the One Canada Square building. This featured Hornby's marble sculptures overlaid with Tantra's trademark colour abstractions, as well as maquettes for larger sculptures drawing on Tantra's colour compositions. The exhibition was described as 'a radical development' in both their careers.

Of public art, Tantra has said: 'There's a sort of "constructivist" approach to the entire process which I like [...] there are the practicalities of making the work itself whilst giving the artwork a "social function"'. She feels that her Balinese heritage has affected her work less in its appearance than in the way that art 'is embedded in life- which is what public art does- and the idea of working together with people [...] I guess that it is like a celebration'.

Tantra has held a number of artists residencies, including a 2014 residency with Cemeti Art House and Mes 56 in Yogyakarta, one of the largest creative communities in Indonesia. It was funded by Arts Council England and the British Council.

== Public commissions ==
=== Palio di Siena (2017) ===
During Tantra's Bridget Riley Fellowship at the BSR, she was selected to design the Drappellone for the 2017 Palio di Siena, a twice-yearly tradition stretching back 600 years, in which representatives of the 17 contradae (districts) of Siena race on horseback to win the prized flag. Since 1970, it is convention that an international artist be chosen to design the flag. Tantra united her contemporary design and colour palette with the compulsory elements: the Madonna of the Assumption, the City insignia (Terzi), and the symbols of each contrada participating in the race), as well as that year's commemoration for Giovanni Duprè.

"For an abstract geometric artist, the biggest challenge was having to include figurative elements. For the Madonna of the Assumption, I represented the figure as a linear drawing based on an early renaissance painting I found by Ambrogio Lorenzetti. The sculpture of Sappho by Giovanni Duprè on the other hand, was based on drawing illustrations by Andy Warhol from the 1950s- I wanted to add a layer of 'pop art' and 1950s nostalgia into the work".

=== Folkestone Triennial (2017) ===
As part of the 2017 Folkestone Triennial, Sinta Tantra was invited by Lewis Biggs (founder of the Liverpool Biennial) to paint the Cube building on Tontine Street. Inspired by the diversity of Tontine Street's migrant residents, Tantra took visual cues from an eclectic mix of sources. The fluid lines and spliced circles flanking one side of the building are a gesture to the colour patterns of Sonia Delaunay (1885-1979). The work's title, and its colours (candy pink, racing green and Wedgewood blue) were lifted from a poster from 1947 advertising rail travel to Folkestone. She says ‘I wanted to inject some of that [advert's] romance into the intervention’.

Tantra has said that the aim of the work was "to make the building fizz". "I wanted to have a retro feel, because I was thinking of Folkestone as a seaside town", she says. "I was thinking about post-war Britain and what that meant, and the idea of holidays, because after the war it was obviously quite difficult."

Design Historian Dr. Paul Rennie of Central St. Martins praised the work's "evident simplicity, economy, and effectiveness [...] Sinta's made a pig-ugly 1970s building disappear into plain view!" Rennie remarked that passersby were afforded "completely different experiences of the building as it shape-shifts in relation to movement. The direct appeal to feeling derived from both colour and movement is irresistible...and provides a nice contrast to the prevailing over-complication of much contemporary [art]."

=== Songdo, South Korea (2015) ===
Tantra was commissioned by the city of Songdo, Korea's ‘High Tech Utopia’, to create a floor painting as part of its major public art programme. Songdo is one of the world's first "Smart Cities". The artwork is located by the waterfront and measures over 3,300 square metres. Seen from above, it communicates the forward-looking drive of the "city of the future".

=== Canary Wharf (2012) ===
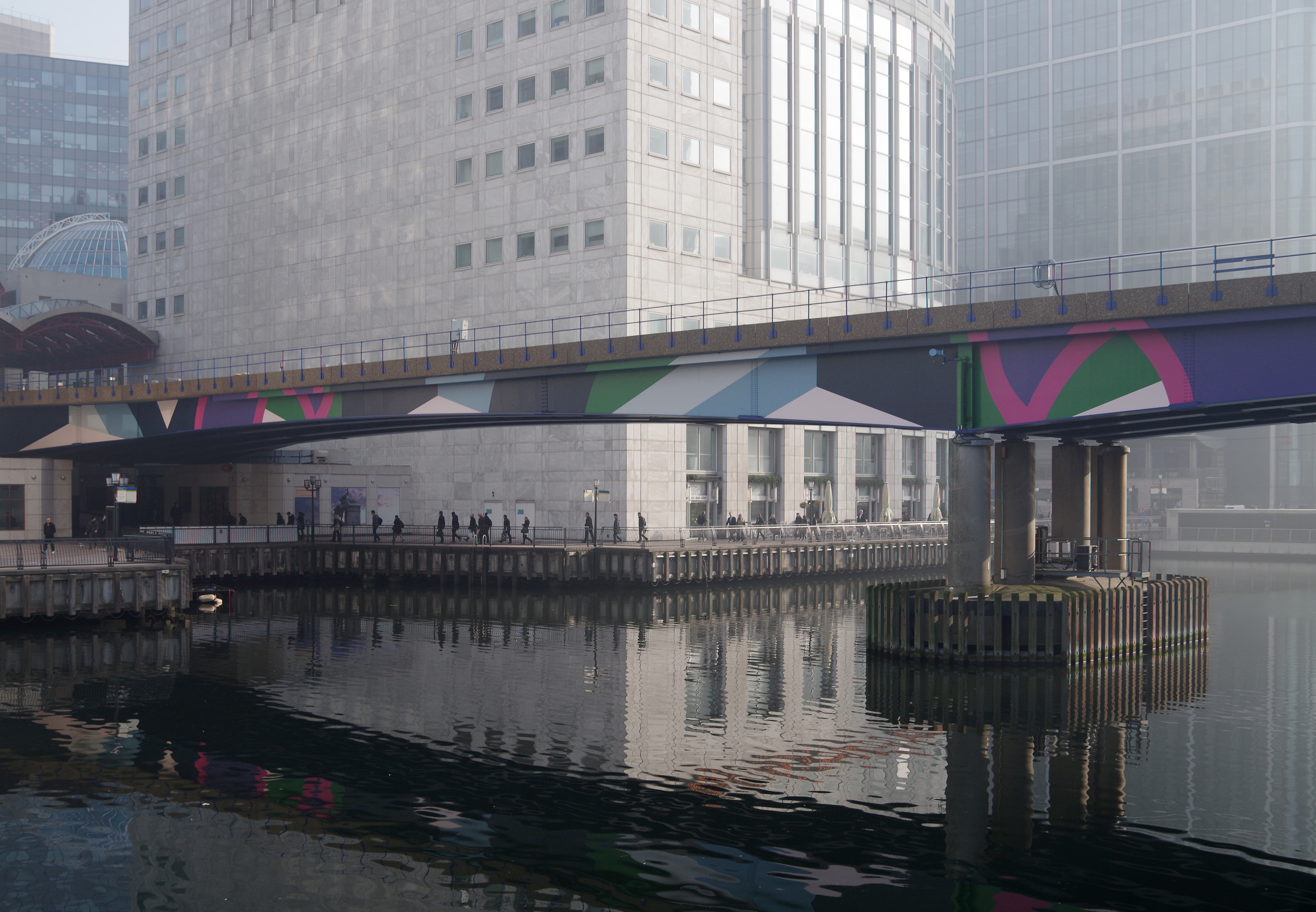
A Beautiful Sunset Mistaken for a Dawn (paint, 2012) by Sinta Tantra, Docklands Light Railway (DLR) Bridge over Middle Dock, Canary Wharf, London, Great Britain

Among Tantra's most notable work is her 2012 A Beautiful Sunset Mistaken for a Dawn. Commissioned by Canary Wharf Group for the 2012 Olympics, the 300 metre-long painted mural features on both sides of the Docklands Light Railway (DLR) bridge that stretches across the Thames in London's Docklands Waterfront. The work was inspired by the high-rise silhouettes of Canary Wharf, and by the ever-changing colours of sunrise and dusk. Sinta explains, "Time and space forms a peculiar concept in our modern world today. There is the working day, our relationship to technology juxtaposed with the nature and universe at large. Through the use of colour, scale and geometry, I wanted to create a painting which engaged the viewer at different times of the day and different times of the year; a piece of work which made you think about the surrounding architecture, the natural landscape and how we as bodies move along, around, above and beneath."

Tantra's palette of muted pinks and blues was complemented by a lighting scheme by Lighting Design International. LED projectors under the bridge washed soft coloured light from end to end, which adapted to echo the transitions of sky from day to night. The painting required 5,000 litres of paint and over 3 km of specialist masking tape to achieve the clean, precise lines that Tantra is known for. As part of the project, Tantra recorded a 24-hour time lapse sequence that showed the sunset and sunrise over the bridge. It is part of Canary Wharf Group's Permanent Collection, alongside artists such as Lynn Chadwick, Bruce McLean, and Catherine Yass.

== Paintings and exhibitions ==
In recent years, Tantra's practice has expanded to include painted canvases, and smaller sculptural interventions. These works are part of her ongoing interest in the relationship between physical and pictorial space, and her exploration of colour, pattern, weight and dimension. She has spoken of her preference for tempera paint: "[it is] very similar to the finish of an Italian fresco; highly pigmented, very matt and has a brilliant lustre […] when you stare at it, its almost like 'falling' into the colour." Her artworks increasingly make use of historical and literary references and found objects, lifting colours and shapes from the 18th century architecture of John Nash to Hollywood films such as Breakfast at Tiffany's.

Tantra's painting practice, like her public artwork, strives to "turn the white cube space inside out". "I want to create a feeling of total immersion, of diving into the colour and into the surface", she explains. Bold geometric patterns and colours seek to create "a more intimate relationship with what you see in front of you - an awareness of material and colour and the solidity between the two".

Tantra has had a number of international solo-shows. Flatland: A Romance of Many Dimensions (2016) at Pearl Lam Galleries, Hong Kong, featured paintings that played with the relationship between the two-dimensional the three-dimensional. "Her works define the clarity between the two but also finds endless ways of distorting it, questioning the relationship between painting and architecture".

Tantra's 2017 solo-show A House in Bali (ISA Art Advisory, Jakarta ) borrowed its title from the name of a Colin McPhee novel. The book depicts Bali as a place rich in culture, spiritual values and pleasure.

As Tantra puts it: "Growing up in London, my Balinese father daily played Gamelan music on the cassette player at home. For him, it was a way to transport himself back to the small village where he grew up and immerse himself in fond memories. In his book, McPhee writes about the relationship between the abstract and syncopated sounds of Gamelan music and how, like Jazz, the music is percussion led. In this new series of paintings, I wanted to draw a stronger focus on a sense of rhythm and how line and colour represents a sort of musical notation across the canvas."

== Media recognition ==
Tantra has been featured in leading UK and international press, including The Guardian, The Evening Standard, Tate Shots, Architectural Digest, Wall Street International Magazine, The Jakarta Post, BBC Indonesia, etc.

In September 2013 she was also a guest on the popular Indonesian talk show hosted by Kick Andy on Metro TV, described as "the Oprah Winfrey of Indonesian Television".

== Awards ==
- 2017 Bridget Riley Fellowship in Drawing, British School at Rome
- 2014 British Council's International Development Award
- 2012 Associate member of the Royal British Society of Sculptors
- 2010 Shortlisted for the Jerwood Contemporary Painting Prize
- 2009 Courvosier The Future 500 in partnership with The Observer Newspaper
- 2007 Westminster Civic Award for Public Arts in London
- 2006 The Deutsche Bank Pyramid Award in Fine Art
- 2006 The Gordon Luton Award from the Worshipful Painters Stainers Trust
- 2005 Nationwide Mercury Music and Art Award Finalist selected by Peter Blake and Tim Marlow
- 2005 Henry Moore Post Graduate Award
- 2004 Michael Moser Award
- 2003 Dover Street Arts Club Excellence in Drawing Prize
- 2003 Paul Smith Post Graduate Scholarship
