= Spy Booth =

Artwork by Banksy

Coordinates: 51.8996°N 2.0661°W

Spy Booth was a 2014 artwork by Banksy in Cheltenham, England. The piece has been seen as a critique of the global surveillance disclosures of 2013.

In 2014, Robin Barton and Bankrobber London helped with the preservation of the artwork, and attempted to broker the removal and sale of the piece. However the artwork was painted onto a Grade II listed building (153–159 Fairview Road) and the council prevented it from being removed, giving it retrospective listed building consent in 2015 and affording it some protection from removal. Despite this, the artwork was removed, destroying it in August 2016. Spy Booth was auctioned as nine stucco-faced brick fragments sawed from the wall and as an NFT.

The GCHQ has used the picture, as a symbolic image for "How does an analyst catch a terrorist?", on its "what we do" page, on its website.

== See also ==
- List of works by Banksy
- List of works by Banksy that have been damaged or destroyed
