= 153–159 Fairview Road =

Terrace of houses in Cheltenham, Gloucestershire

Coordinates: 51.8996°N 2.0661°W

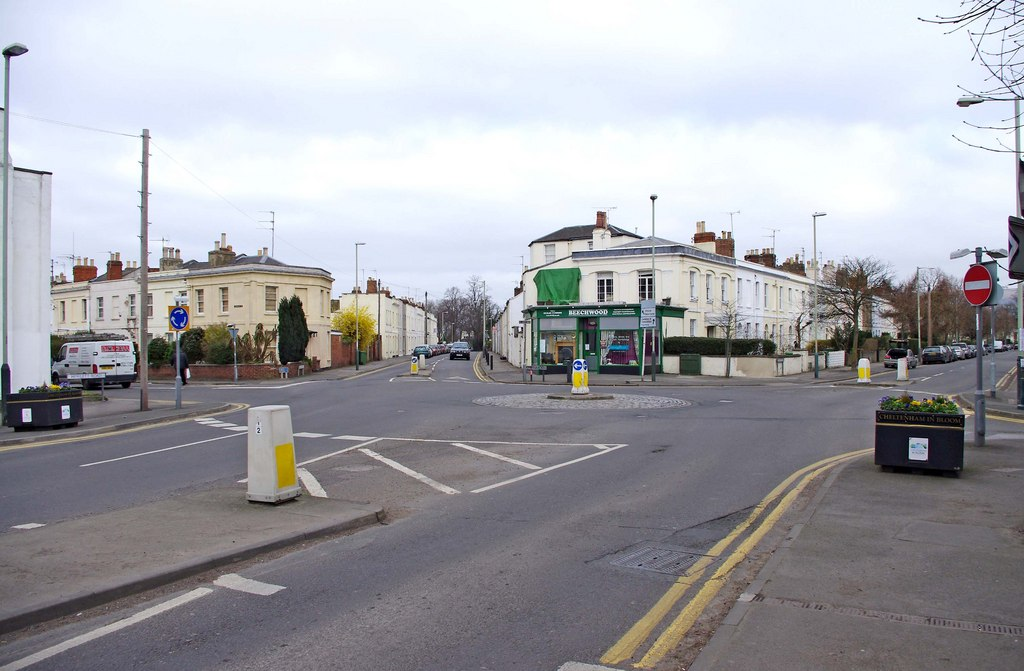
The junction of Fairview Road and Hewlett Road

153–159 Fairview Road is a terrace of four houses in Cheltenham, Gloucestershire, on the south side of Fairview Road beside the roundabout at its junction with Hewlett Road. The terrace became a Grade II listed building in 1972. The street artist Banksy produced an artwork, Spy Booth, on either side of a public telephone booth adjacent to the gable end of number 159 in April 2014. The work was destroyed in August 2016.

== Buildings ==
The terrace comprises four houses (odd numbers, from right to left: 153, 155, 157 and 159), constructed between c. 1806 and 1835, with later 19th- and 20th-century additions and rear extensions. Fairview Road was developed from 1806, when the field in which the road was built was inclosed by an Act of Parliament.

The two-storey houses were built from ashlar blocks, and are now covered in stucco, with pilasters between the houses and at each end of the row, and string course between the floors. A parapet with frieze atop the façade conceals the pitched roof. No. 153 also has an architrave and cornice. Nos. 153 and 155 have three bays each, originally with 2-over-2 sash windows, and nos. 157 and 159 have two bays each, originally with 1-over-1 sash windows. All have their entrance door in the right bay, recessed in nos. 153 and 155, and all have glazed overlights above panelled doors.

A house adjacent to 159 Fairview Road, at 64 Hewlett Road, was acquired by Gloucestershire County Council in around 1962 and demolished to allow for road improvement works.

== Artwork ==
The street artist Banksy created an artwork, Spy Booth, on either side of a public telephone adjacent to the gable end of no. 159 in April 2014, showing three stereotypical secret agents wearing dark sunglasses and brown raincoats, holding microphones to eavesdrop. The building is approximately 3 miles (4.8 km) from The Doughnut, the headquarters of the Government Communications Headquarters (GCHQ).

The artwork drew hundreds of visitors and suffered from several acts of vandalism before it was boarded up to protect it. Some reports indicate that it was sold to Sky Grimes, and was damaged in an attempt to remove the plaster on which it was created. Gloucestershire County Council delivered a "stop notice" requiring works to remove the plaster to cease, and then granted retrospective listed building consent for the artwork in February 2015, giving it protection under the building's listing. However, the artwork was destroyed in August 2016.
