= Creative Folkestone =

Charity Group

- Former name: Creative Foundation
- Established: 2002
- Location: Folkestone, Kent
- Type: arts charity OR independent charitable trust
- CEO: Alastair Upton
- Chairperson: Sir Roger De Haan CBE DL
- Website: https://www.creativefolkestone.org.uk/

Creative Folkestone (formerly The Creative Foundation), is a UK charity dedicated to art and culture, based in Folkestone, Kent, UK.

It is responsible for the Creative Folkestone Triennial, the Quarterhouse (a theatre and event space) and Folkestone's Creative Quarter. The trust was set up to demonstrate how creative activity can help make Folkestone a better place better to live, work, play and visit. The trust manages approximately 90 buildings, providing work and living spaces for a wide variety of creatives. In 2008, it organised the first Folkestone Triennial, the UK’s largest exhibition of newly-commissioned public art, with the sixth Triennial having taken place in July 2025. Commissions of permanent artworks add to the town's outdoor art gallery, Folkestone Artworks.

== History ==
=== Socio-economic background ===
Folkestone developed as a significant tourist destination in 1843, when the railway line was extended from London to the then fishing town, resulting in a boom in the town’s popularity. The opening of the Channel Tunnel in 1991 delivered a twin blow – as tourist and freight traffic bypassed the town. The port finally closed in September 2000 when the last cross-channel service was withdrawn. After more than a hundred years as a hub of tourism and trade, Folkestone was left in a serious economic decline. Despite the decline in local tourism and the closure of the port, Folkestone’s population grew by 5.9% from 1995-2005 (compared to 3.2% for the UK as a whole), mirroring the situation in seaside towns nationally where inward migration has outstripped local job creation.

“The combination of factors including unemployment, educational achievement and anti-social behaviour and the way in which the patterns of these factors express themselves spatially, with the prosperity of the Folkestone drifting westwards and deepening cycles of deprivation occurring in the centre and east of the town have led to concerns about community cohesion and social regeneration”.

=== Roger De Haan Charitable Trust ===
Sir Roger De Haan has focused his energies on philanthropic activities and the development of Folkestone’s Harbour and its seafront in an effort to reverse the impact of the town’s decline. The Roger De Haan Charitable Trust provided £50 million to acquire and repair, refurbish and/or rebuild nearly 90 buildings in Folkestone that were previously in a state of serious disrepair or derelict. Sir Roger sold the Saga Group for £1.35 billion in 2004, and acquired Folkestone Harbour for £11 million the same year.

=== Creative Foundation (2002 - 2019) ===
Approximately 80 flats, 115 studios, offices and over 50 shops, in nearly 90 buildings, were transferred to The Creative Foundation by the Roger De Haan Charitable Trust (RDHCT) from 2002. Previously derelict or in a state of serious disrepair, RDHCT acquired the buildings and repaired, refurbished and/or rebuilt them before transferring them to the Creative Foundation on 125-year peppercorn leases. The Creative Foundation's ongoing costs and growth of the organisation were funded through a mixed model of earned income from renting out work and living spaces and additional funding sources including Arts Council England.

=== Creative Folkestone (2019 - current) ===
Shortly after being announced as an Arts Council England National Portfolio Organisation in 2018, the Creative Foundation underwent a rebrand to become Creative Folkestone to better reflect its close connection and influence on the town and wider region.

== Operational activities ==
Operating expenses include outgoings such as managing and maintaining the Folkestone Artworks, Folkestone’s Creative Quarter as well as commissioning works for the Folkestone Triennial. The core activities of Creative Folkestone are focused around five key projects: Creative Quarter, Quarterhouse, Folkestone Triennial, Folkestone Artworks and Folkestone Book Festival.

=== Creative Quarter ===
Almost 600 people are active in Creative Quarter work and living spaces, engaged in a wide range of creative occupations. Spread across 90 restored buildings, comprising 80 flats, 115 studios and offices and over 50 shops, Folkestone’s Creative Quarter is an urban village which includes artists, performance artists, dressmakers, dancers, photographers, graphic designers, writers and filmmakers. A digital hub called digital:glassworks has also attracted creators of diverse forms of digital media and creative industries.

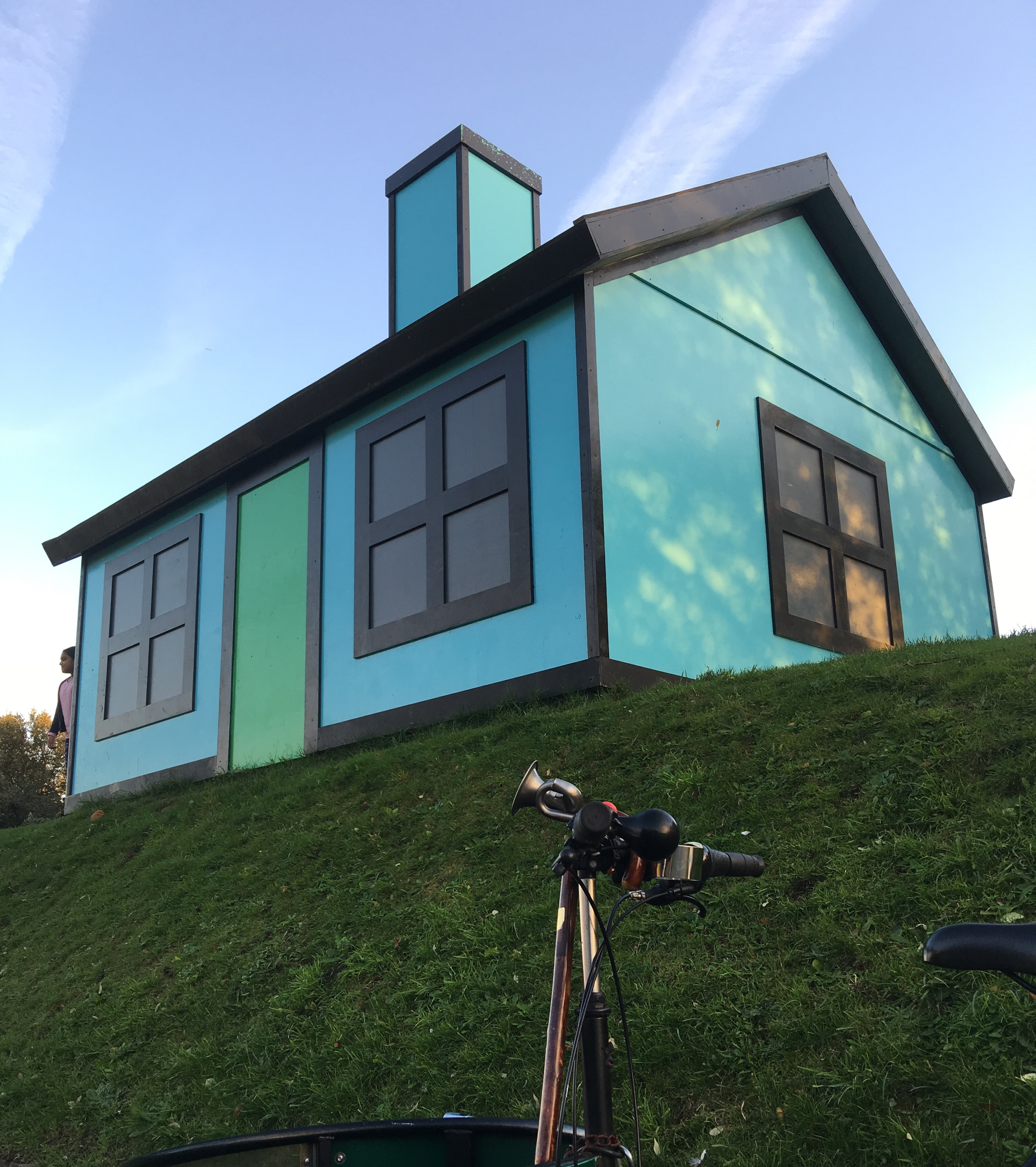
A Folkestone Triennial artwork by Richard Woods

=== Creative Folkestone Quarterhouse ===
Creative Folkestone Quarterhouse is a performing arts venue situated in the heart of Folkestone’s Creative Quarter. Quarterhouse is used for a wide range of activities with a regular programme of theatre, dance, music, film, comedy and family shows as well as live screenings from organisations including Royal National Theatre and Royal Opera House. In addition to the 250 seat capacity auditorium, (490 standing), Quarterhouse is home to both Creative Folkestone’s administrative offices and the Folkestone Triennial.

=== Creative Folkestone Triennial ===
First established in 2008, Creative Folkestone Triennial is now the largest exhibition of newly-commissioned work presented in the UK. Site-specific artworks are commissioned for what are often unusual locations around the town and along Folkestone’s coastline, including works from Lubaina Himid, Tracey Emin, Antony Gormley, David Shrigley, Cornelia Parker and Yoko Ono. The fifth edition of the Triennial opened in July 2021, having been delayed in 2020 by the COVID-19 pandemic.The sixth Triennial - How Lies the Land?, curated by Sorcha Carey - took place from July to October 2025.

=== Creative Folkestone Artworks ===
The town’s outdoor public art exhibition – Folkestone Artworks – is the UK’s largest urban outdoor contemporary art exhibition, consisting of 74 contemporary artworks by 46 artists including Himid, Emin, Ono and Gormley. Folkestone Artworks is refreshed every three years, as permanent works commissioned for the Folkestone Triennial are incorporated, with works by Himid, Emin, Ono and Gormley added in 2007, 2008, 2014 and 2017 respectively.

=== Creative Folkestone Book Festival ===
Originally the Kent Literature Festival, the Folkestone Book Festival found a permanent home in the Quarterhouse and was rebranded as Creative Folkestone Book Festival in 2009. It is normally held in November and heralds the start of the festive season. High profile participants have included Elif Shafak, Beryl Bainbridge, Margaret Drabble, Ben Okri and Ian McEwan.

== Impact ==
The Independent included Folkestone on its 2020 list of the best UK destinations for public art. The town's outdoor gallery is seen as competing against conventional indoor galleries, with the Evening Standard featuring Folkestone’s Artworks among its top ten art galleries outside London. Since the introduction of High Speed Rail (HS1) it now takes 53 minutes to get to Folkestone from London, less time that it takes to get to six other places on the top ten list, including Margate’s Turner Contemporary. According to Creative Folkestone CEO Alastair Upton, anecdotal evidence suggests that more creatives have relocated to Folkestone since the onset of the COVID-19 pandemic, boosting demand for the work and living spaces the charity manages, with a remit to rent out spaces at below market rates. Even before the pandemic, 98% of work and living spaces in the Creative Quarter were occupied. In an interview with The Independent, Upton explained that “the artworks here are almost the last priority focus – the essential outcome of making this a good destination for creatives to settle”. The idea of the town as a backdrop for creativity is encapsulated by one piece featured in Artworks, titled “Folkestone is an art school”.

=== Cultural destination ===
A transition of Folkestone to cultural hotspot has been attributed to Creative Folkestone. The town's regeneration has attracted people to live and work there, with activities organised by Creative Folkestone – ranging from Artworks to the book festival – credited with boosting the town's quality of life. CEO Upton terms Folkestone’s approach to regeneration "production-led", in contrast to what he calls a consumption-led or construction-led approach of attracting tourists to a newly built art gallery.

=== Inclusive regeneration ===
Creative Folkestone has endeavoured to involve the whole of the local community in its activities, securing the involvement of local schools in its projects. Recent education projects include Pioneering Places East Kent, which partnered with the Architectural Association's "Little Architect" programme to connect primary school children with architecture, local planning and regeneration projects for the town.
