= Creative Folkestone Book Festival =

- Status: Active
- Genre: Literary festival
- Frequency: Annually
- Locations: Folkestone, Kent
- Country: England
- Years active: 46 (since 1980)
- Most recent: 13-23 November 2025
- Next event: 12-22 November 2026
- Website: https://www.creativefolkestone.org.uk/folkestone-book-festival/

The Creative Folkestone Book Festival is an annual event held in Folkestone, Kent, England, featuring creative residencies, workshops for adults and children, and appearances by notable writers.

== History ==
The festival was founded as the Kent Literature Festival in 1980, before being rebadged as the Folkestone Literary Festival in 2002, when it grew in prominence under the auspices of the Creative Foundation - now Creative Folkestone.

In 2005 local people were encouraged to engage with the Festival through the formation of the Friends of the Book Festival. In 2006, Hay Festival Director, Peter Florence, was commissioned to produce a plan to further develop the Festival, which helped to attract star names including high profile participants such as Ben Okri, Alan Bennett, Beryl Bainbridge, Elif Shafak, Margaret Drabble, Ian McEwan, Ted Hughes and P.D. James.

The festival was rebranded as Folkestone Book Festival in 2009, moved from September to November and found a new permanent home in Folkestone’s Quarterhouse at the heart of the town's Creative Quarter.

The 2018 event was billed as the most international ever, with 50 events, and including an Indian night, an American day, and a Turkish night.

As a result of the global COVID-19 pandemic, the Creative Folkestone Book Festival was postponed in 2020 and replaced with Autumn Reads, a four-day festival with online participation via Zoom, inspired by the diaries of filmmaker Derek Jarman following the acquisition of Jarman’s Prospect Cottage at nearby Dungeness by the Art Fund. A particular noted highlight was the actor Ben Whishaw reading from Derek Jarman’s Modern Nature journals inside Prospect Cottage at Dungeness.

Dates for the 2021 Book Festival were announced in March 2021 after a year's hiatus as a result of the pandemic. Returning to the 2019 Book Festival theme and title of "The Shape of Things to Come" and inspired by the ideas and thoughts of former Folkestone resident, H. G. Wells., those confirmed to take part include founder of the Everyday Sexism website, Laura Bates, Luke Harding, David Lammy, Nick Bryant and Natalie Haynes. The 2021 Festival also featured a headline event, Beckett in Folkestone, an immersive multimedia experience celebrating Samuel Beckett’s connections with Folkestone. In 2022 the festival examined threats to writers and their work and featured new work produced by Deborah Levy and Juno Dawson during their residencies in Prospect Cottage. In 2023, the overall theme was global ideas, and how people around the globe can connect through written word, and authors Kim-Joy and Madeline Bunting were featured. 2024 was a slightly different year, with no one overarching theme. Topics like comedy, motherhood, and cultural issues were all discussed. John Boyne and Steven Moffat were some key speakers this year. 2025 had a theme of the idea that "Folkestone is a library", a living archive Authors Irvine Welsh and Joanne Harris were speakers at the 2025 event. 2026 had a focus on stories that change perspectives, with figures like Sir Tony Robinson and Billy Childish being announced as speakers for the event.

=== Past festival curator/directors ===
- 2002–2008: Saga Magazine's editor, Emma Soames, and then by its contributing editor, Camilla Swift.
- 2009–2011: Roberta Spicer: Festivals and Programming Manager.
- 2012–2018: Geraldine D’Amico
- 2019–2022: Seán Doran and Liam Browne, a duo who partner under the banner DoranBrowne, which runs the Arts Over Borders programme in Ireland.
- 2023: Jen Thatcher and James Harkin
- 2024-present: Sophie Haydock

== Venues ==
Initially located in the Metropole Arts Centre it began to attract larger audiences by using the Saga Pavilion and The Grand as its main venues from 2002. The Grand, the Lanterns and the Leas Club have also been used as venues. The Festival has been based at Quarterhouse in the heart of Folkestone’s Creative Quarter as its main venue since 2009, although other venues across Folkestone and Romney Marsh continue to be used.

== Prizes and sponsorship ==
Saga sponsored the Festival from 2002 up until 2006 and has funded prizes including The Saga Prize for Wit and Humour (for writers over 50 years old, with a £20,000 prize). Principal sponsor for the 2021 Creative Folkestone Book Festival is the independent news discovery platform, News Now, with additional support provided by the Roger De Haan Charitable Trust, Arts Council England, Folkestone & Hythe District Council, Kent County Council, the EU Interreg North Sea Region Cupido programme and educational partners, Canterbury Christ Church University.
