= Cristina Iglesias =

Spanish artist (born 1956)

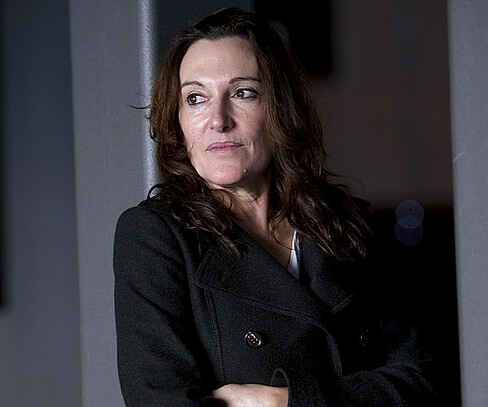
- Born: 1956 (age 68–69); San Sebastián, Spain
- Known for: Installation art
- Spouse: Juan Muñoz
- Website: cristinaiglesias.com

Cristina Iglesias (born 1956) is a Spanish installation artist and sculptor living and working in Torrelodones, Madrid. She works with many materials, including steel, water, glass, bronze, bamboo, straw. On January 20, 2016, she was awarded the Tambor del Oro in San Sebastian. Iglesias was the first Spanish woman invited to exhibit her work at the Folkestone Triennial in 2011. She is the sister of Academy Award-nominated film composer Alberto Iglesias.

== Early life and education ==
Iglesias was born in San Sebastián, Northern Spain in 1956. She commenced a degree in Chemical Sciences at Universidad del País Vasco in 1976 before out in 1978 to practise ceramics and drawing in Barcelona. In 1980, she moved to London to study Sculpture at the Chelsea College of Art in London where she met her husband, Juan Muñoz and other artists such as Anish Kapoor.

=== Exhibitions ===
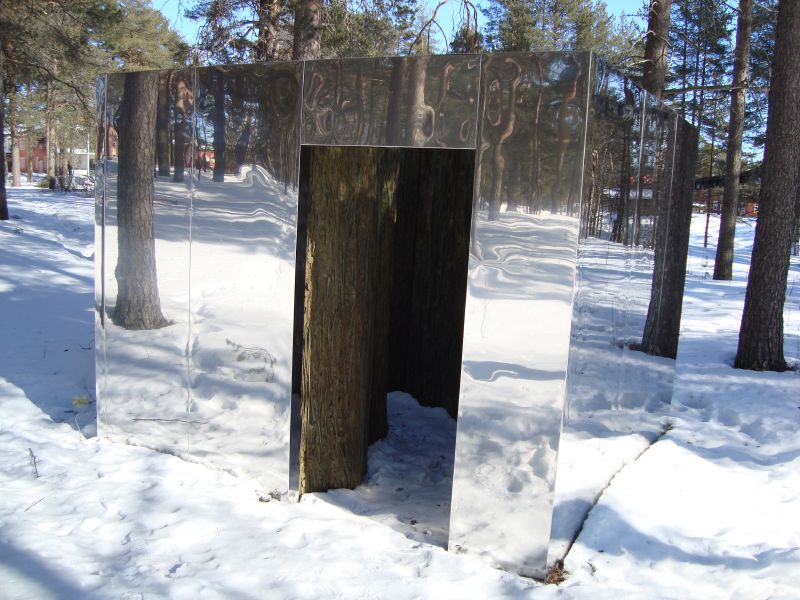
Umeå sculpture park/Sweden with 13 Resin and Bronze Powder Panels (2000)

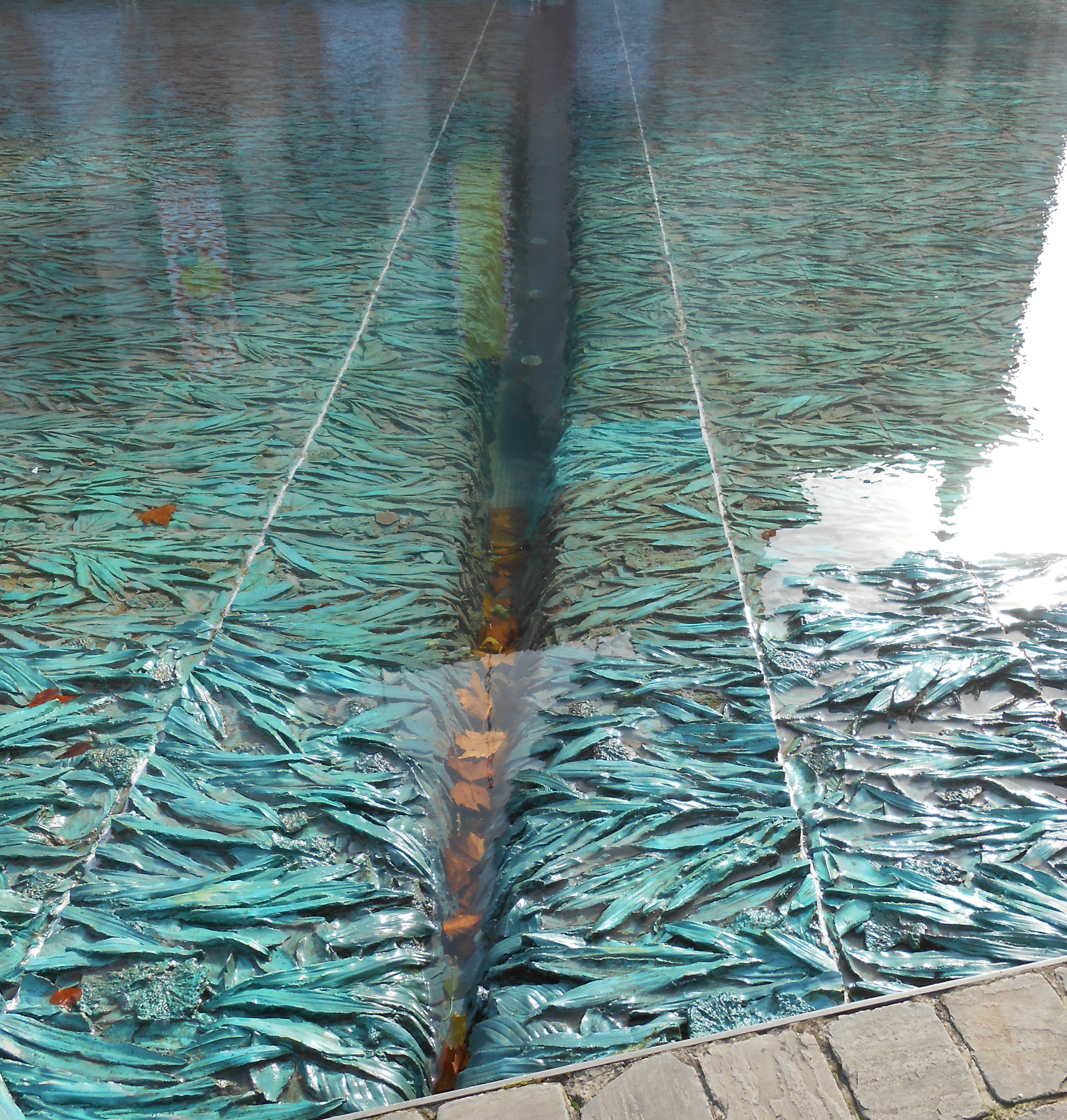
Deep Fountain by Cristina Iglesias, 2009

Iglesias began exhibiting in the 1980s and has since taken part in over 60 individual and group exhibitions in Europe, North America and Japan.

==== Solo exhibitions ====
Year	Gallery
1991	Kunsthalle Bern
1994	Stedelijk Van Abbemuseum in Eindhoven
1998	Solomon R. Guggenheim Museum in New York
2003	Irish Museum of Modern Art in Dublin
2006	Museum Ludwig in Cologne
2007	Instituto Cervantes in Paris
2007	Doors to the new wing of the Museo del Prado, Madrid
2016	Musée de Grenoble in Grenoble
2018	Centro Botín, Santander, Spain

==== Group exhibitions ====
Year	Show
1986	Spanish Pavilion, Venice Biennale
1993	Spanish Pavilion, Venice Biennale
1990	18th Sydney Biennale
2000	Carnegie International, Museum of Art Carnegie Institute, Pittsburgh
2000	Exposición Universal in Hannover
2002	Happiness at the Mori Art Museum in Tokyo
2005	Big Bandat the Centre Pompidou in Paris
2006	SITE, Santa Fe
2010	Pacing Through Architecture, Whitechapel Gallery
2011	Folkestone Triennial

=== Awards ===
Iglesias was honoured with the National Award for Plastic Arts in 1999. She was also awarded the Berliner Kunstpreis in 2012.
