= Gregor Schneider =

German artist

Gregor Schneider (born 1969 in Rheydt) is a German artist. His projects have proven controversial and provoked intense discussions. In 2001, he was awarded the Golden Lion at the Venice Biennale for his infamous work Totes Haus u r exhibited at the German Pavilion.

== Life and work ==
Gregor Schneider studied from 1989 to 1992 at several German Art Academies including the Kunstakademie Düsseldorf (Art Academy of Düsseldorf) and at Kunstakademie Münster (Academy of Fine Arts Münster), and at the Hochschule für bildende Künste (University of Fine Arts Hamburg). From 1999 to 2003, he served as a guest professor / educational activities at several art schools, including De Ateliers in Amsterdam, the Academy of Fine Arts Hamburg, and De Ateliers in Amsterdam, the Academy of Fine Arts Hamburg and at the Royal Danish Academy of Fine Arts, Copenhagen. From 2009 to 2012 he was a professor of sculpting at the University of Art Berlin and from 2012 to 2016 a professor at the Academy of Fine Arts, Munich. Since 2016 he is a follower of Tony Cragg at Arts Academy Düsseldorf as a professor of sculpting.

In 2015, Gregor Schneider was elected to the North Rhine-Westphalian Academy of Sciences, Humanities and the Arts. In May 2018, Schneider was elected as a new member of the Visual Arts Section on the Berlin Academy of Arts.

At the age of 16, Schneider had his first solo exhibition entitled, Pubertäre Verstimmung, at the gallery Kontrast in Mönchengladbach. Since the beginning of the 1990s he has worked with rooms in galleries and museums. He conceives the rooms as the-dimensional, sculptures that can be walked through, which oftentimes hide or alter the existing gallery- and museum rooms; the rooms he works with are existing rooms he finds in different dwellings or domestic buildings. In 1985 he began dismantling and rebuilding rooms in an apartment building in Rheydt, which he entitled, Haus u r.

=== The "Haus u r" ===
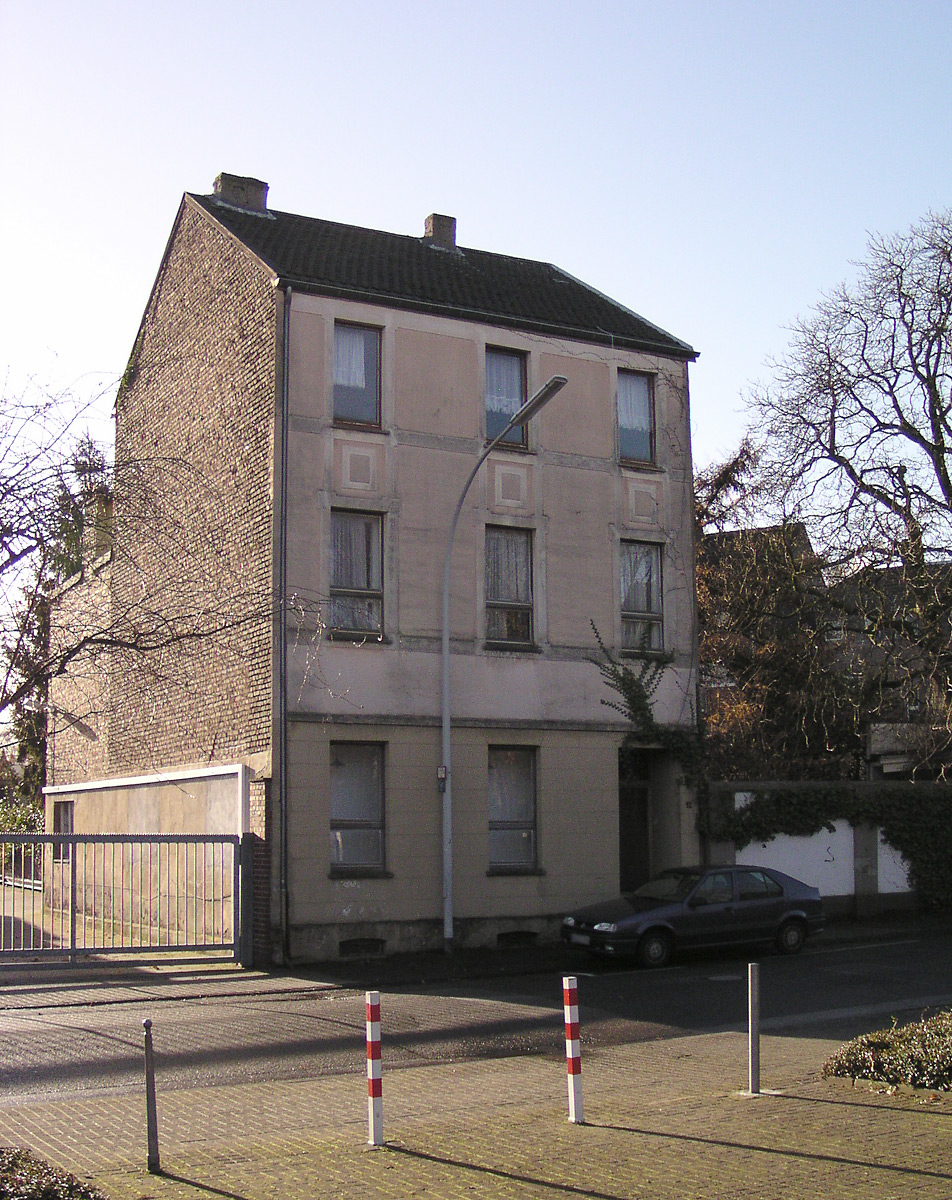
The Haus ur at the Unterheydener Straße in Mönchengladbach-Rheydt

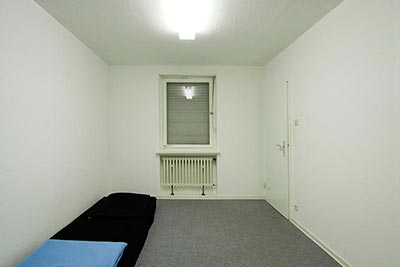
u r 1 u 14, SCHLAFZIMMER, Rheydt 1986 – 1988

Since 1985, Schneider has been working elaborately on an inherited house on Unterheydener Strasse in Mönchengladbach's Rheydt district. The "u r" refers to Unterheydener Strasse und Rheydt. Located on premises of his family's lead factory, the house could not be rented out. Schneider created replicas of the existing rooms (a bedroom, a coffee room, a lumber-room, a kitchen, a corridor, a cellar) by building complete rooms inside of other rooms each consisting of walls, ceilings and floors, the installation results in hollow interspaces. These doubled rooms are not recognisable as rooms within rooms to the viewers. Additionally, he slowly moves the rooms out of sight by employing machines that push ceilings or complete rooms. Some rooms become inaccessible because they are hidden behind walls and some have been isolated by concrete, plumbing, insulation or sound-absorbing materials. Via outside fixed lamps, different times of the day have been simulated. The rooms are numbered consecutively (u r 1 -).

=== "Totes Haus u r" in Venice ===
In 2001, Gregor Schneider won the "Golden Lion" at the 49th Biennale in Venice, with his solo exhibition, "Totes Haus u r Venedig 2001". Udo Kittelmann, at that time, director of the Kölnischen Kunstverein invited the artist to create solo exhibition in the German pavilion. Within three months time Schneider built a Totes Haus u r inside the pavilion, he transported by ship a total of 24 original rooms using100 packing pieces with a combined weight of 150 tons from Rheydt to Venice; Schneider refers to the rooms, which he has built out of the Haus u r or which have been rebuilt at another place, as Totes Haus u r.

Schneider rebuilt the rooms inside the German pavilion into a similar house with double walls and double floors on the ground in a house just as he did in Rheydt. He remodeled a late 19th-century entrance with columns as standard door entrance with a letterbox-slot and aged doorbell panels on the side. Inside windows could not be opened to the outside. "One builds what one no longer knows", Schneider commented about his installation. Within the Biennale the work has also been interpreted as a subtle political declaration, because the German pavilion building from 1909 has been often considered as the most "intimidating" building "in the area of the Giardini".

In 2003, the Tote Haus u r was constructed for one year inside the Museum of Contemporary Art Los Angeles.

=== Cube ===
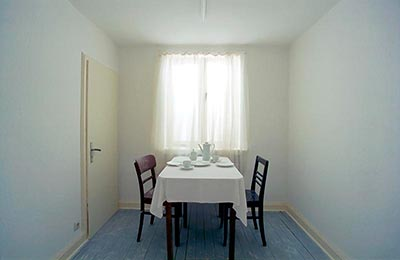
u r 10, (with inventory) KAFFEEZIMMER. "Wir sitzen, trinken Kaffee und schauen einfach aus dem Fenster", Rheydt 1993

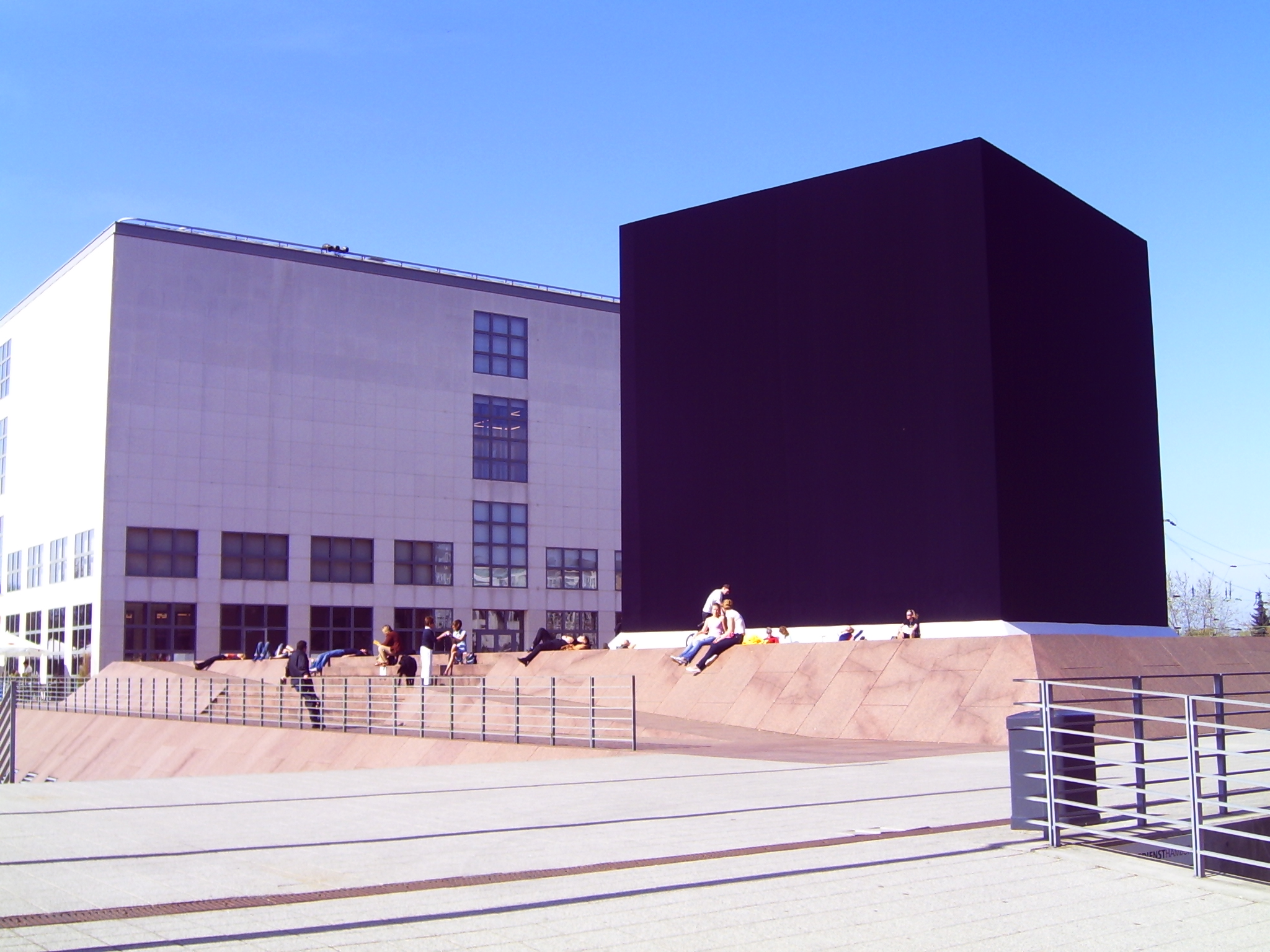
The Black Square – Hommage to Malevich near the Hamburger Kunsthalle

In 2005, Gregor Schneider was officially invited to realize the Cube Venice 2005 at the Piazza di San Marco in Venice during the 2005 Biennale. Shortly before the opening of the exhibition, the sculpture was rejected due to its "political nature". Cube Venice 2005 was intended to be an independent sculpture in form, function and appearance, inspired by the Kaaba in Mecca, the holiest place of Islam, the destination of millions of believers who make the pilgrimage every year. Kaaba means "cubic building". This artwork became an international controversy discussed widely in the media. As a result, it was rejected shortly before being realized in the courtyard of the Hamburger Bahnhof, museum of contemporary art in Berlin. Finally, Schneider realized his work Cube Hamburg 2007 between the old and new buildings of the Hamburger Kunsthalle. Under the artistic direction of the curator, Dr Hubertus Gaßner, director of the Hamburger Kunsthalle, different aspects of a painting from 1878 to 1935 were analyzed in an exhibition entitled "The Black Square – Hommage to Malevich". To convey the different aspects of "The Black Square" the exhibition featured further works by Malevich as well as works of his contemporaries, scholars, and critics.

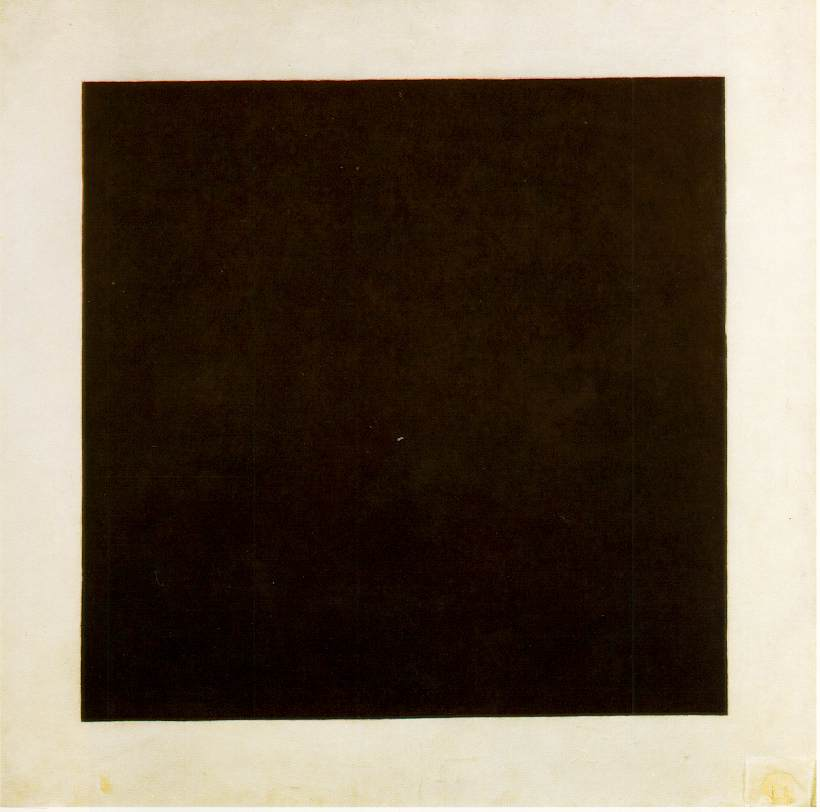
Black Square (1915) by Kasimir Malevich

The Cube Hamburg 2007 has been used as an inter-religious platform. Ahmet Yazici, the deputy president of the alliance of the Islamic communities in North Germany, congratulated the artist "on his project which fosters understanding amongst international cultures".

Gregor Schneider said with regard to the origin of the idea of the cube: "It is not my idea, but the idea of a believing Muslim. He saw the connection to the Kaaba, to this building, which, in my view, is one of the most fascinating and beautiful buildings of in the history of mankind". Schneider made the following remark about the work: "The sculpture demands something from every participant (...) The box summons us all, it allows me to look past the critical reporting and to call on the public, something I didn't have to do before. It challenges Muslims, which didn't know this way of rapprochement before, and it shows something to the visitors of the western world they have never seen before. In the history of Islam Abraham/Ibrahim is the constructor of the Kaaba. All three Monotheistic religions can identify with this building very well."

=== Bondi Beach, 21 beach cells ===
A 400 square meter large installation composed of 21 identical cells sprung up at one of the most famous beaches on the Australian east coast, the Bondi Beach, under the correspondent title Bondi Beach, 21 beach cells. This to the exhibition place syntonized artwork questions "the ideal of a casual, egalitarian leisure-loving society", even there "elsewhere beachballers and backpackers, marathon swimmers and wedding couples define the image".

=== END ===
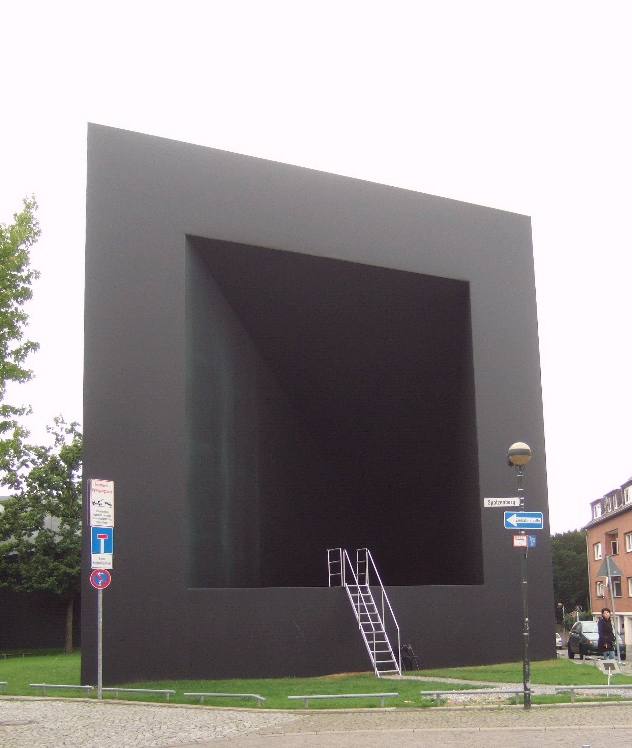
"END"

From November 8, 2008, to September 6, 2009, Gregor Schneider's 14 meter high, black outdoor sculpture "END" was accessible to the public. The artist built "END" in front of the Museum Abteiberg in Mönchengladbach. The sculpture was connected to the museum and served as an alternative entrance. Before walking through the "END" the visitor had to sign a release form that stated that they understood they were entering of their own accord into an environment with "steep ladders, narrow and/or totally dark rooms which may cause physical and/or mental impairment". After signing the declaration the visitor was allowed to enter the room-ensemble "END" by a huge ladder through a black entrance. In most parts of the room, the total darkness caused the visitor to lose all sense of orientation in the space. The only possibility for the visitor to orient themselves was by feeling the walls of the corridor. Four rooms out of the Haus u r were integrated into the "END".

=== Dead End ===
Dead End was the title of the project that Gregor Schneider conceived for CA2M in Madrid in 2011. In Dead End, the artist has situated himself in a theoretical no man’s land at the point of contact between the vestiges of the traditional house that once occupied the site of the museum in Mostoles and the present building itself. Visitors wend their way through a vast, enclosed labyrinth of pipes that extend throughout the centre. The concept of his earlier rooms is shifted here to hallways and corridors that lead the visitor to disconcerting spaces that include environments lifted from the house u r and other projects. As is always the case in the work of Gregor Schneider, the complex he has created appears to have been original to the site.

=== Sterberaum ===
In 2008, Schneider caused a media controversy with his stated intention for the installation Sterberaum (Dying Room): "I want to exhibit a person who has died a natural death, or someone who has just died." Shortly after, German newspaper headlines read, "Artist wants to let people die". Politicians of several German political parties, the CDU, FDP and Die Grünen, voiced their opinions accusing Schneider of "abusing of artistic freedom" calling his plans an "attempt at provocation" and a "half-baked idea". On several online newspapers threads, people posted comments that glorified violence. Schneider got death threats by phone and mail. "There are absurd death threats against me", Schneider said in an interview with Westdeutsche Zeitung. The Guardian headline on April 26 read: "There is nothing perverse about a dying person in an art gallery". Overall, there was extensive media coverage in several countries in multiple languages.

Sterberaum has eventually been executed at Kunstraum Innsbruck (2011–2012) as an empty room, "a personal commission to design the room and the environment in which we die, in which we dissolve, to then be dead." A glowing free-standing structure featuring 2 doors, 2 sets of windows, 5 lamps, white walls and ceiling, and a parquet floor was placed inside the pitch-black gallery. During the COVID-19 pandemic, the room was also placed on the stage of the Staatstheater Darmstadt and streamed live for three days and nights.

== Exhibitions and projects ==
- 1985 Pubertäre Verstimmung, Galerie Kontrast, Mönchengladbach
- 1985 – today Haus u r, Rheydt
- 1992 1985–1992 September 92 – , Galerie Löhrl, Mönchengladbach
- 1993 16. September 1993 – , Konrad Fischer Galerie, Düsseldorf
- 1994 11. März 1994 – , Galerie Andreas Weiss, Berlin
- 1994 Drei Arbeiten, Museum Haus Lange, Krefeld
- 1995 Fotos und Videos 1985–1995, Galerie Luis Campaña, Cologne
- 1996 Gregor Schneider, Kunsthalle Bern, Bern
- 1996 Gregor Schneider, Künstlerhaus Stuttgart, Stuttgart
- 1997 schlafen, Konrad Fischer Galerie, Düsseldorf
- 1997 Hannelore Reuen alte Hausschlampe, Rheydt 1992, Galerie Luis Campaña, Cologne
- 1997 Totes Haus u r 1985–1997, Rheydt, Kunsthalle Frankfurt a. M., Frankfurt a. M.
- 1997 Gregor Schneider, Gallery Wako Works of Art, Tokyo
- 1997 Puff(aus Berlin), Gallery Sadie Coles HQ, London
- 1998 Puff, Städtisches Museum Abteiberg, Mönchengladbach
- 1998 La maison morte u r 1985–1998, Musee d'Art Moderne de la Ville de Paris, Paris
- 1998 Gregor Schneider, Gallery Wako Works of Art, Tokyo
- 1998 haus u r, Rheydt, Aarhus Kunst Museum, Denmark
- 1999 Death House 1985–1999 Cellar, Galleria Massimo de Carlo, Milano
- 1999 53rd Carnegie International, Carnegie Museum of Art, Pittsburgh, Pennsylvenia
- 1999 schlafen, Kabinett für aktuelle Kunst, Bremerhaven
- 1999 Totes Haus, Rheydt, Kunsthalle Bremerhaven, Bremerhaven
- 2000 Hannelore Reuen Alte Hausschlampe, Fundacja Galerii Foksal, Warszawa
- 2000 Keller, Wiener Secession, Wien
- 2000 Alte Hausschlampe, Museum Haus Esters, Krefeld
- 2000 Apocalypse, Beauty and Horror in Contemporary Art, Royal Academy of Art, London
- 2000 Death House u r, Douglas Hyde Gallery, Dublin
- 2001 Totes Haus u r, 49. Biennale von Venedig, Venezia
- 2001 N. Schmidt, Kabinett für aktuelle Kunst, Bremerhaven
- 2002 Haus u r, Stiftung DKM, Duisburg
- 2002 Gregor Schneider, Konrad Fischer Galerie, Düsseldorf
- 2002 Gregor Schneider, Gallery Wako Works of Art, Tokyo
- 2002 Fotografie und Skulptur, Museum für Gegenwartskunst, Siegen
- 2003 Gregor Schneider. Hannelore Reuen, Hamburger Kunsthalle, Hamburg
- 2003 My Private #1, via Pasteur 21, Milano
- 2003 Death House u r, Museum of Contemporary Art Los Angeles, California
- 2003 517West 24th, Barbara Gladstone Gallery, New York
- 2003 Gregor Schneider, Aspen Art Museum, Aspen
- 2004 Die Familie Schneider, Artangel London, London
- 2005 Cube Venice 2005, Gallery Konrad Fischer, Düsseldorf
- 2005 28. August 2005 – , Kabinett Für Aktuelle Kunst Bremerhaven, Bremerhaven
- 2006 Totalschaden, Bonner Kunstverein, Bonn
- 2006 4538KM, MDD Museum Dhont-Dhaenens, Deurle,
- 2006 Doublings, Galerie Luis Campaña, Cologne
- 2006 Gregor Schneider Fotografie, Kunstverein Arnsberg e. V, Arnsberg
- 2006 2. November 2006, Kunst-Station Sankt Peter Köln, Cologne
- 2006 My Private escaped from Italy, Centre international d'art et du paysage de L'ile Vassiviere, Ile de vassiviere
- 2006 26. November 2006, Fondazione Morra Greco, Napoli
- 2007 Gregor Schneider, Milwaukee art Museum, Milwaukee
- 2007 Weisse Folter, K20K21 Kunstsammlung Nordrhein-Westfalen, Düsseldorf
- 2008 süßer duft, La Maison Rouge, Paris
- 2008 Gregor Schneider. Doublings, Museum Franz Gertsch, Burgdorf BE
- 2008 Cube Venice – Design and conception, Fondazione Bevilacqua La Masa, Venezia
- 2008 END, Museum Abteiberg, Mönchengladbach
- 2009 Garage 2009. Museum Abteiberg, Mönchengladbach
- 2010 Gregor Schneider – Marienstraße, Peill Prize, Leopold-Hoesch-Museum, Düren
- 2011 Punto Muerto, Centro de Arte 2 de Mayo, Madrid
- 2011 Sterberaum, Kunstraum Innsbruck, Innsbruck
- 2014 Gregor Schneider. Hauptstraße 85 a, Synagoge Stommeln
- 2014 Neuerburgstrasse 21, Installation in der Halle Kalk des Schauspiel Köln
- 2014 German Angst, Yokohama Triennale 2014, Yokohama Museum of Art, Yokohama
- 2014 Gregor Schneider: Totlast, Lehmbruck Museum, Duisburg in Zusammenarbeit mit der Ruhrtriennale (wurde vom Oberbürgermeister der Stadt Duisburg abgesagt)
- 2014 Liebeslaube, Volksbühne Berlin, Berlin
- 2014 it's all Rheydt, Gallery Wako Works of Art, Tokyo
- 2014 Die Familie Schneider, Konrad Fischer Galerie, Berlin
- 2014 unsubscribe, Zacheta – National Gallery of Art, Warszawa
- 2014 unsubscribe, Volksbühne Berlin, Berlin
- 2015 White Torture 2005 – today, XII Bienal de La Habana, La Habana, Cuba
- 2015 Gregor Schneider, Museum Künstlerkolonie, Darmstadt, Germany
- 2016/2017 Gregor Schneider: Wand vor Wand (2. Dezember 2016 bis 19. Februar 2017), Kunst- und Ausstellungshalle der Bundesrepublik Deutschland, Bonn
- 2017 Kindergarten, Museo Universitario Arte Contemporáneo, Ciudad de México, Mexico
- 2017 Invisible City, Onassis Cultural Centre / Fast Forward Festival, Omonia Square, Athens
- 2017 N. Schmidt, Pferdegasse 19, 48143 Münster, Skulptur Projekte Münster 2017, LWL-Museum für Kunst und Kultur, Münster, Germany
- 2017 Never Ending Stories, Kunstmuseum Wolfsburg, Wolfsburg, Germany
- 2018 Fundamentalist Cubes: Inside Spaces by Bruce Nauman, Absalon, and Gregor Schneider, M-ARCO, Marseille, France

== Awards ==
- 1995 Kunstpreis NRW
- 1995 Werkstipendium des Kunstfonds e.V., Bonn
- 1995 Werkstipendium der Stiftung Kunst und Kultur, NRW
- 1996 Projektförderung Institut für Auslandsbeziehungen, Stuttgart
- 1996 Karl-Schmidt-Rottluff-Stipendium
- 1996 Peter Mertes Stipendium
- 1996 Dorothea von Stetten Art Award
- 1997 Förderpreis der Alfried Krupp von Bohlen und Halbach Stiftung
- 1998/99 Kunststipendium Bremerhaven
- 1999 Art Scholarship Villa Romana, Florence
- 2001 Golden Lion, Biennale Venedig
- 2002 1. Preis des Papier-Kunst-Preises des Verband Deutscher Papierfabriken VDP
- 2006 Best Exhibition of the Year, Contemporary Art in Belgium 2006
- 2008 Günther Peill Kunstpreis
- 2011 Bambi LTD Award, Israel
- 2011 Special Jury Award vom Star Ananda, Bengali television, India
- 2014 Children's Choice Award the Ruhrtriennale 2014: Best of the Best
- 2014 Wilhelm-Loth-Prize, Darmstadt
- 2014 AICA Prize: The special exhibition of 2014
- 2015 Member of North Rhine-Westphalian Academy of Sciences, Humanities and the Arts
- 2016 Art critics have chosen the show "Wand vor Wand" in Bonn's Bundeskunsthalle for the exhibition of the year in NRW.
- 2018 Member of Visual Arts Section on the Berlin Academy of Arts.

== Literature ==
- Gregor Schneider, Udo Kittelmann: Gregor Schneider, Totes Haus Ur, La Biennale di Venezia, 2001, Hatje Cantz Verlag, 2002, ISBN 2-7028-9292-2
- Gregor Schneider: Die Familie Schneider, Steidl Göttingen, 2006, ISBN 3-86521-236-0
- Gregor Schneider: Cubes: Art in the Age of Global Terrorism Gva-Vertriebsgemeinschaft, 2006, ISBN 88-8158-580-4
- Kunstforum International (Plateau der Menschheit), Nr. 156, August to October 2001. S. 288 und 305.
