= Russell Young (artist) =

British-American artist (born 1959)

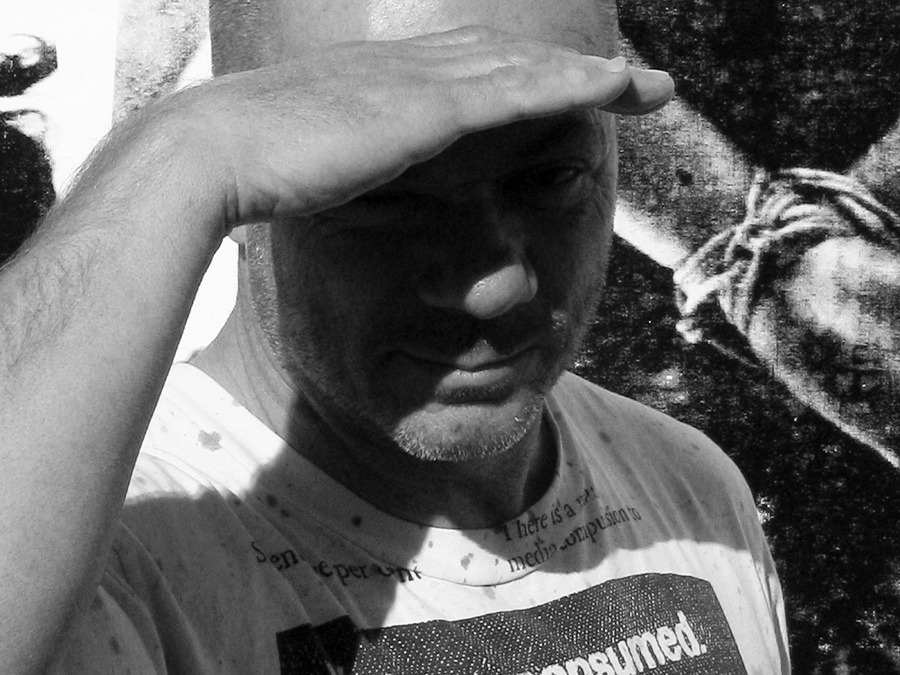
- Russell Young in 2012
- Born: 13 March 1959 (age 67); York, Yorkshire, England
- Education: University of Chester, Exeter College of Art and Design
- Known for: Screen Printing, Painting, Conceptual art, Installation art
- Spouse: Finola Hughes (m. 1992; div. 2021)
- Children: 3
- Website: www.russellyoung.com

Russell Young (born 13 March 1959) is a British-American artist best known for large silkscreen paintings using imagery drawn from recent history and popular culture. Young's artistic output includes painting, screen printing, sculpture, installations and film.

== Life ==
Young studied photography, film and graphic design at the University of Chester and later attended Exeter College of Art and Design. He moved to London and gained recognition photographing the early live club shows in the late 1970s of Bauhaus, R.E.M. and the Smiths, and with editorial work for magazines including BLITZ, which featured on several front covers. During this period he shot portraits of Morrissey, Björk, Bruce Springsteen, Bob Dylan, New Order, Diana Ross, and Paul Newman. In 1986, he shot the ‘Faith’ sleeve for George Michael. In the following ten years he directed many music videos, working with artists ranging from the Brand New Heavies to Eartha Kitt.

In September 2000, while living in New York City, he began to concentrate on art and to devote himself to painting. Young's work has been shown nationally and internationally including at Scope/Basel, Switzerland SCOPE Art Show and Art Miami, Florida. He lives and works in New York and California.

== Career ==
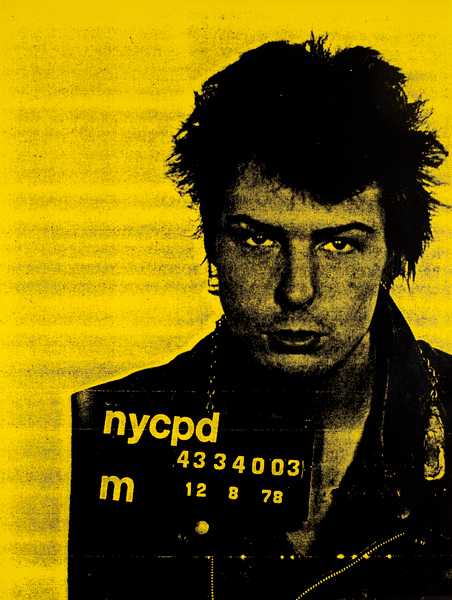
Sid Vicious, 2001, 48 x 60 inches, silkscreen on canvas

During the 1990s, Young gave up photography and directing altogether and started to paint seriously. In 1998 he relocated to New York, rented a studio in Williamsburg, Brooklyn and worked on a series of ‘Combine Paintings’, assemblages of collage, found objects and street graffiti. In 2001, he began the series called 'Pig Portraits'. He had acquired the mugshots of musicians, actors and political figures and he blew them up as bold, colorful, silkscreen, portraits of Sid Vicious, Elvis Presley, Jane Fonda, Malcolm X, Steve McQueen, Frank Sinatra and Lee Harvey Oswald. "They were meant to be anti-celebrity portraits. To take a dig at my former career I guess. As a release. But they ended up–I think they look better than they do in some of the sessions." He first showed the Pig Portraits at Don O'Melveny Gallery in Los Angeles in 2003.

After 9/11 Young and his family returned to California. In 2005, he showed his Fame+Shame series with the Art of Elysium at Menotti Gallery in Los Angeles, documenting the fallout from the cultural excess of previous decades.

Young began to use diamond dust in 2007. He called the paintings Dirty Pretty Things, pressing the crystals into the web pigment of the images of his paintings. In 2008 he showed many of these at the Kessler Gallery in Southampton, New York as Diamond Dust. He used this process in his well known series, Marilyn Crying, showed at the Halcyon Gallery in London in 2016.

Young became very ill and almost died in February 2010. He was in a coma for 8 days brought on by pneumonia and ARDS; all induced by the H1N1 virus. Young emerged from his long recovery examining his life and surroundings and began to explore the nature of trauma and its effect on both the individual and cultural psyche. 2011 forced a seminal shift in his work, first in the series Helter Skelter, using the violent image from the 1968 Rolling Stones Altamont Free Concert and the Hells Angels killing of Meredith Hunter, over and over, in a series of abstractions. Helter Skelter was shown at SCOPE Miami in 2014 by Bankrobber London.

The Goss-Michael Foundation in Dallas held a retrospective of Young's work in the winter of 2012. He also showed a series of large paintings called Only Anarchists are Pretty in the front gallery. He cut up 1970s photographs of bound women and lay them onto large, "unimaginable orgies of claustrophobic assemblage" and titled from the council estates in the deprived areas of Britain: Thorntree, Nant Peris, the Gorbals. An idea he borrows from Joy Division naming themselves for the sexual slavery rooms of nazi concentration camps, told of in the House of Dolls.

Young began two large series of abstract works in 2011. In the Fight of the Paso del Mar, he threw the dust of metals into wet, black pigment and sprayed them with sea water and rain to allow the metals to rust and turn colors. He named them for his favorite surf breaks along the California coast. In Dreamland, he poured paint on the floor and printed it onto linen, building up atmospheric scapes with the names of atomic bomb tests. He showed his Fight of the Paso del Mar and Dreamland paintings at Bankrobber London in 2013.

In honor of Pelé, Young did a screen print in 2015.

In October 2018, Russell Young Superstar, opened at the Modern Art Museum Shanghai, a former coal bunker along the banks of the Huangpu River. It is the most extensive survey of his work to date and introducing his 5-year project West.

== Charitable work ==
Young is an active supporter of The Art Of Elysium, an organization empowering artists and communities of need to join and emotionally triumph over their circumstances through art. In 2016 Russell Young received the Spirit of Elysium award from Vivienne Westwood and Andreas Kronthaler in recognition of their charitable enterprises using art as a catalyst for social change.

== Exhibitions ==
Solo Exhibitions:

- Dreamland, Maddox Gallery, London (December 2023 - February 2024)
- The Glamour Game, Maddox Gallery, London (December 2022 - February 2023)

Group Exhibitions:

- Connecting Outcomes, Maddox Gallery, London (January - March 2025)
- The Maddox Collection, Maddox Gallery, London (September - October 2023)
