= Amalia Pica =

Argentine artist

- Born: 1978 (age 47–48); Neuquén, Argentina
- Education: Rijksakademie van Beeldende Kunsten; Instituto Universitario Nacional del Arte; Escuela Nacional de Bellas Artes P.P; Clínica de Obra con Tulio de Sagastizabal

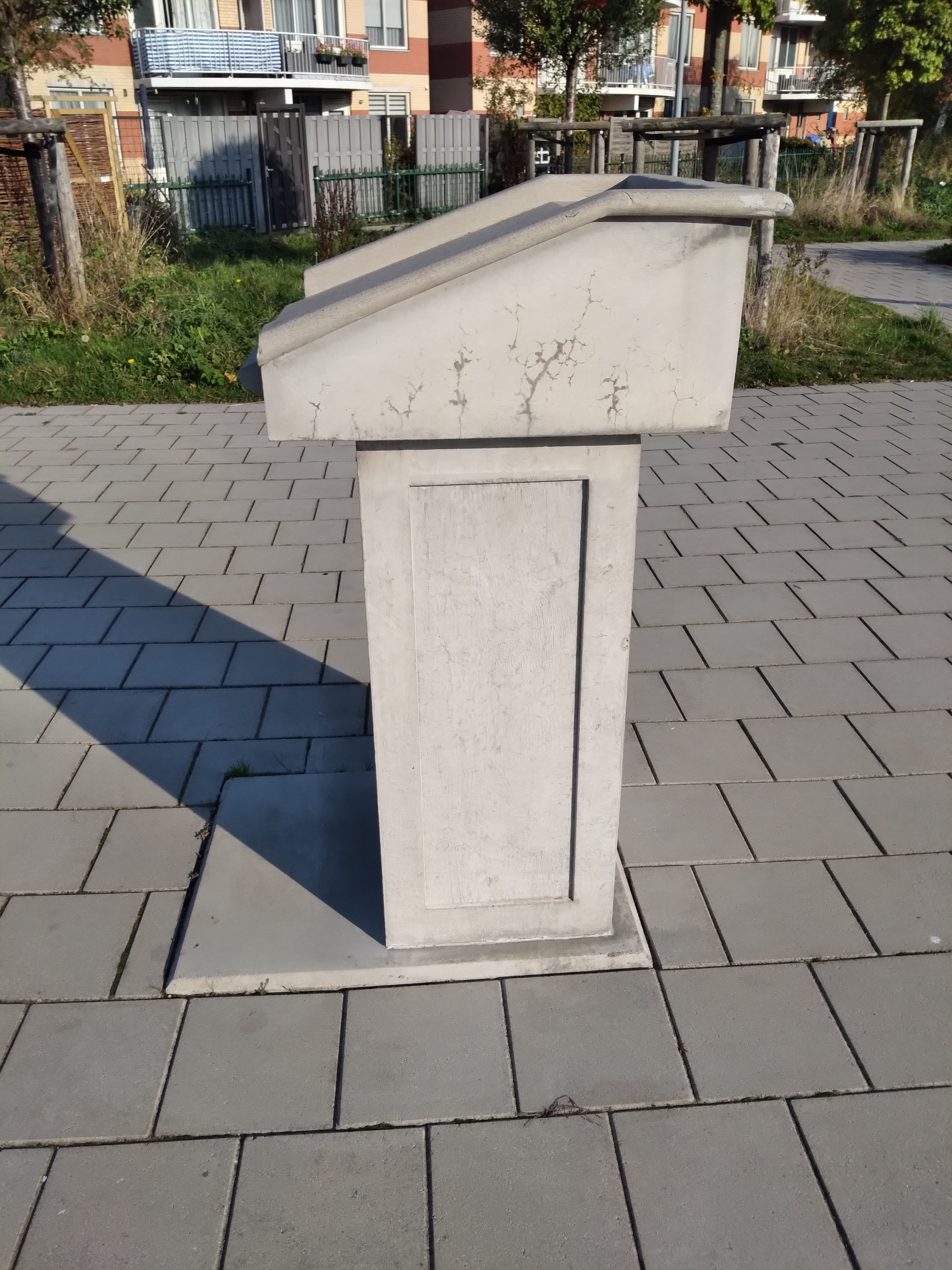
Now speak! by Pica, Krimpertplein, Amsterdam-Zuidoost (2021)

Amalia Pica (born 1978 in Neuquén, Argentina) is a London-based Argentine artist who explores metaphor, communication, and civic participation through sculptures, installations, photographs, projections, live performances, and drawings. Pica currently works and lives in London.

== Early life and education ==
Pica was born in Neuquén, Argentina, in 1978. She earned a BA from the Escuela Nacional de Bellas Artes Prilidiano Pueyrredón in Buenos Aires in 2003. From 2004 to 2005, she held an artist residency at the Rijksakademie van beeldende kusten.

== Influences and work ==
Pica was born in the late 1970s during the Dirty War, a period of state terrorism in Argentina. In light of this fact, Pica's work raises questions about the role of government, language and communication, and human connections. Much of her work explores fundamental issues of communication, such as the acts of delivering and receiving messages (verbal or nonverbal) and the various forms these exchanges may take.

Victor Grippo, Cildo Meireles, Lygia Clark and Hélio Oiticica, among others, were the artists that Pica first studied.

=== Strangers (2008–16) ===
Pica's performance piece, Strangers, first performed in 2008, was featured in the updated Tate Modern and focuses on the complex communication between strangers. The work requires two strangers to hold each end of a string of colorful bunting without letting it touch the ground in the limited space. The resulting distance creates a barrier that prevents the linked participants from having an intimate communication. Julie Rodrigues Widholm, director at the DePaul Art Museum, states that, “The bunting suggests a party or communal gathering, and Pica plays with the idea of distance and proximity as it relates to communication.”

=== One, No One and One Hundred Thousand (2016) ===
In 2016 Amalia Pica participated in the group exhibition “One, No One and One Hundred Thousand” shown in the Kunsthalle Wien (Vienna). Amalia Pica was one of nine artists who were commissioned to create art that alters continually in contact with visitors; viewers were invited to mount and change the exhibition, resulting in an unlimited number of possible arrangements. The exhibition aimed to question the dominant role of the curator in structuring the exhibition. According to the Kunsthalle Wien, “the main actor of the exhibition will be the spectator who will not act as a consumer but as a co-producer of the artists and the curator.” Pica exhibited her series, Joy in paperwork (2016).

=== A ∩ B ∩ C (2013) ===
In A ∩ B ∩ C (read as A intersection B intersection C), Amalia Pica uses translucent colored Perspex shapes, with which performers will produce different compositions in front of the audience. The notion of intersection links to the idea of collaboration and community. This artwork is a performative manifestation of Venn diagrams, which were forbidden from being taught in elementary schools during the 1970s, as the concept of intersection and collaboration were seen as potentially subversive by the Argentine dictatorship.

The inspiration for Pica's exhibition, A ∩ B ∩ C, stems from the dictatorship in her home country of Argentina (1976–1981). A ∩ B ∩ C critically comments on the banning by the dictatorship of Venn Diagrams in elementary schools. In the Guggenheim Museum’s Soundcloud excerpt, Pica discusses her “Art Under the Same Sun” exhibition, housed at the Guggenheim in 2013, sharing her interest in the overlapping and intersecting of individual objects.

=== Amalia Pica (2012–13) ===
Previously shown at the Chisenhale Gallery in London and at the MIT List Visual Arts Center in Cambridge, Massachusetts, the exhibition Amalia Pica uses everyday objects as signifiers of celebration: fiesta lights, flags and banners, confetti, rainbows, photocopies, lightbulbs, drinking glass, beer bottles and cardboard. According to the publishing house, & Pens Press, “Pica’s work is directly dealing with the translation of symbolic language and motivated by how meaning is created and deciphered between the artist and the viewer.”

=== Catachresis (2011-12) ===
Metaphors are also part of Pica's work, as she uses figures of speech to describe things that have no name. "An object that has no name—that, in a way, escapes language—by invoking something entirely unrelated. Hence, we get phrases like ‘leg of the chair’ or ‘neck of the bottle’ which attach human qualities to inanimate things. Objects have a space and a weight, a physical presence that eludes language. You can't speak an object: you have to speak around it. Metaphors are a way of doing that. In a sense, when we talk about the world, it's always in metaphors." Pica's Catachresis merges distinct and contrasting found materials, such as the leg of a table or the elbow of a pipe, to construct sculptural forms that become new tools of communication and take on identities of their own.

=== Venn diagrams (under the spotlight) (2011) ===
Pica's interest in the relationship between text and image is evident in Venn Diagrams (under the Spotlight), which consists of two colored circles of light cast from theater spotlights to form a Venn diagram. The Argentine government banned this diagram from being taught in classrooms in the 1970s, as it was thought to be an incendiary model of social collaboration. "The two circles of light are nothing but forms until the caption situates them historically, cluing you to their perception as subversive in the context of Argentine dictatorship in the 1970s. I’m interested in the ideas that we project onto images and objects: how they resist as much as accommodate them."

=== Hora Catedra (2002) ===
Pica is also fascinated with childhood. Possibly her best-known early work, Hora Catedra, explores the lessons and themes of childhood and how they irrevocably stay with us through adult life. In Hora Catedra, Pica proves how what we internalize during our childhood will accompany us through adult life: most Argentines believe The House of Tucuman, the site of Argentina's Declaration of Independence, to be yellow, as it is shown in children's books. However, it is actually white. The 2002 site-specific installation bathed the building in a bright yellow light, in reference to the misconception.

== Exhibitions ==
Amalia Pica's work has been exhibited at the Museum of Contemporary Art in Chicago, the Venice Bienniale, and the Tate Modern in London. In 2014, her work was included in the group exhibition, Under the Same Sun, presented at the Guggenheim Museum in New York. Her artwork is part of MACBA, and the Guggenheim's collection.

=== Selected solo exhibitions ===
Date	Exhibition	Place
2023	¡Qué viva el papeleo!	Museo Jumex, Mexico City
2022	rock comb	Brighton CCA, Brighton, UK
2020	Round table (and other forms)	Museum Haus Konstruktiv, Zurich, Switzerland
2016	Strangers	TATE Modern, London
2014	A ∩ B ∩ C	Van Abbemuseum, Eindhoven
2014	One thing after another	La Criée, Centre d'Art Contemporain, Rennes, France
2014	Dessauerstrasse	König Galerie, Berlin
2014	Switchboard	Mostyn, Wales
2013	Memorial for Intersections	Kunsthalle, Lisbon
2013	Low Visibility	König Galerie, Berlin
2013	A ∩ B ∩ C	Museo Tamayo, Mexico City
2013	Ascendant Artists: Amalia Pica	Museum of Contemporary Art, Chicago
2013	Amalia Pica	MIT List Visual Arts Center, Cambridge
2012	Amalia Pica	Chisenhale Gallery, London
2012	On Paper	Basis, Frankfurt
2012	For Shower Singers	Modern Art Oxford, Oxford, United Kingdom
2011	Amalia Pica: UMMA Projects	University of Michigan Museum of Art, Ann Arbor, Michigan
2011	Endymion's Journey	Marc Foxx Gallery, Los Angeles
2010	Amalia Pica: babble, blabber, chatter, gibber, jabber, patter, prattle, rattle, yammer, yada yada yada	Malmö Konsthall, Malmö

=== Selected group exhibitions ===
Date	Exhibition	Place
2026	Between Tides	Public Art Fund, New York, NY
2019	Fly me to the Moon. The Moon landing: 50 years on	Kunsthaus Zürich, Zürich, CH
2019	Iteraciones sobre lo no mismo	Museo de Arte Contemporáneo de Buenos Aires, Buenos Aires, Argentina
2019	Concrete Contemporary	Museum Haus Konstruktiv, Zürich, Switzerland
2019	Is This Tomorrow?	Whitechapel Gallery, London, UK
2019	After Leaving / Before Arriving	12th Kaunas Biennial, Lithuania
2018	12th Shanghai Biennale	Power Station of Art, Shanghai, China
2018	Darbyshire, Gander, Pica, Starling	Hayward Gallery, London, UK
2017	Double Edge	Folkestone Triennial, Folkestone Triennial, Folkestone, UK
2017	Soundtracks	San Francisco Museum of Modern Art, San Francisco, US
2017	Curators’ series #10: Greater than the sum, curated by Kunsthalle Lissabon	David Roberts Art Foundation, London, UK
2017	Monumentos, anti-monumentos y nueva escultura pública	Museo de Arte Zapopan, Zapopan, Mexico
2016	One, No One and One Hundred Thousand	Kunsthalle Wien, Zürich, Switzerland
2016	Under the Same Sun: Art from Latin America Today	Museo Jumex, Mexico City (Guggenheim touring)
2015	Material	König Galerie, Berlin
2015	Display Show	Eastside Projects, Birmingham, UK, touring to Stroom den Haag, The Hague, NL
2015	Beauty Codes	Fondazione Giuliani, Rome
2015	Repetition and Difference	The Jewish Museum, New York
2015	Group Exhibition	Marc Foxx Gallery, Los Angeles
2014	Histories II: Works from the Serralves Collection	Museu Serralves, Porto, Portugal
2014	The Reluctant Narrator	Museu Berardo, Lisbon
2014	Under the Same Sun: Art from Latin America Today	Solomon R. Guggenheim Museum, New York
2013	Audible Forces	F-320, New Delhi, India
2013	The Printed Room: Emmy Moore's Journal	Salts, Birsfelden, Switzerland
2013	When Attitudes Became Form Become Attitudes	MOCAD Detroit, Michigan
2013	Version Control	Arnolfini, Bristol, United Kingdom
2013	Project Space: Ruins in Reverse	TATE Modern, London
2012	Chronic Listeners	Kunst Halle Sankt Gallen, St. Gallen, Switzerland
2012	Common Ground	Public Art Fund, New York
2012	The Ungovernables	New Museum, New York
2012	Silence	Menil Collection, Houston
2010	Map Marathon	Serpentine Gallery, London
2008	World Event	Kunsthalle Basel, Basel
2007	Drawing Typologies	Stedelijk Museum, Amsterdam

== Recognition and awards ==
Amalia Pica was awarded a CIFO grant, from the Cisneros Fontanals Art Foundation, in 2011. In that same year, her work was part of the ILLUMInazioni project in the Venice Biennale. Also in 2011, Pica received the illy Prize—aimed at celebrating the most innovative artist of the international art fair Art Rotterdam—and the Paul Hamlyn Foundation Award, established by one of the largest independent grant-making foundations in the UK.

In 2012, Amalia Pica was the recipient of The Future Generation Art Prize, which she received for an installation of her works focusing on communication and listening. Featured works are Sorry for the metaphor, Acoustic Radar in Cardboard, Under the Spotlight: Red on Red and Eavesdropper. The artist herself explains that “the way [she] installs [her] shows are more like conversations between different pieces…the works kind of shift meaning every time there’s a new company of other works.” Pica's interest in human modes of communication extends to exploration of the human desire to be understood despite the imperfections of those forms of communication.

In 2013, she was one of the finalists for the Pinchuk Foundation's Future Generation Art Prize. In 2020, she was awarded the Zurich Art Prize.
