= Blitz (British magazine) =

British fashion and culture magazine

BLITZ
- Front cover Feb 1986
- Categories: Fashion, popular culture
- Frequency: Monthly
- First issue: Sept 1980
- Final issue: May 1991
- Country: United Kingdom
- Based in: London
- Language: English
- Website: blitzmagazine.co.uk

BLITZ was a British fashion and culture magazine published between 1980 and 1991.

Its contributors included the writers Paul Morley, Susannah Frankel, Jim Shelley, Simon Garfield, Ian Parker, Marc Issue, Fiona Russell Powell and Paul Mathur; photographers included Nick Knight, Russell Young, Mark Harrison, Gillian Campbell, Marcus Tomlinson, Pete Moss and Julian Simmonds; editorial staff included Tim Hulse and Bonnie Vaughan; its fashion editors were Iain R. Webb (from 1982 to 1987) and Kim Bowen (1987 to 1989). Jeremy Leslie was responsible for the graphic design of the magazine from 1984 to 1989.

== History ==
BLITZ was the creation of a 20-year-old Oxford University undergraduate, Carey Labovitch. She launched the first issue in A3 format at the beginning of her second year, in September 1980, selling copies through newsagents and at street markets including Covent Garden Market in London. The magazine was initially quarterly. However, the third issue was accepted by WH Smith for national distribution, prompting a substantial increase in print run, and also won the Guardian/NUS Student Media award for Best Graphics in 1981.. She was joined that year by fellow undergraduate Simon Tesler, and together they decided to take BLITZ professional at the end of their final year in 1982. At the same time the format of BLITZ was slimmed down to a traditional expanded A4 format to fit standard newsagents' shelves, and frequency was increased to alternate monthly, and then monthly. Early issues had a strong focus on arts, theatre and literature as well as music and film, but fashion became a major feature of the magazine from 1982 following the arrival of Iain R Webb as fashion editor.

Subject matter also diversified widely into politics, true crime, art theory, philosophy and graphic design. Its cover stars included Boy George, Jack Nicholson, Duran Duran's Simon Le Bon, Morrissey, Robert De Niro; but also artists Andy Warhol and Peter Blake, TV executive Michael Grade and author Martin Amis. The magazine interviewed musicians, actors and filmmakers including Madonna, Martin Scorsese, Siouxsie. Pete Townshend, Charlotte Rampling, Paul Weller, Daniel Day-Lewis, Lenny Henry and Steve Martin; the politicians Michael Foot, Norman Tebbit, Ken Livingstone, Douglas Hurd and Jeffrey Archer; writers Hunter S. Thompson, Germaine Greer, Allen Ginsberg; the artist Gerald Scarfe; TV personalities like comedians Cannon & Ball and Max Wall and travel reporter Alan Whicker; writers John Mortimer and Keith Waterhouse; sportsmen such as darts champion Eric Bristow and cricketer Ian Botham; and the criminals Charles Manson and Reggie Kray.

In 1986, fashion editor Iain R Webb commissioned twenty designers to customise a Levi's denim jacket in their own style. Among those who agreed to create a jacket were Jean Muir, Vivienne Westwood, Paul Smith, Katharine Hamnett, Joseph, Betty Jackson, John Galliano, Hermes' Eric Bergere and performance artist Leigh Bowery. This was originally conceived as purely a magazine feature, but the finished jackets formed the centrepiece of an event at the Albery Theatre in London, with appearances by Boy George, actress Miranda Richardson, singers Nick Heyward and Adam Faith, models Marie Helvin and Margaux Hemingway, and the band Curiosity Killed the Cat. The jackets then went on show to the public in a three-month summer exhibition at the Victoria & Albert Museum, followed by another exhibition at the Musée des Arts Décoratifs at the Paris Louvre. Proceeds from the Albery Theatre show and the subsequent auction of all 22 jackets were donated to the Prince's Trust.

Another offshoot from the main magazine was the publication by Ebury Press in 1987 of Exposure!, a book of black and white portrait and fashion photographs from the first seven years of Blitz, accompanied by an exhibition of prints from the book in the 20th Century Gallery of the V&A.

The economic boom period of the later 1980s saw the magazine at its peak both commercially and creatively. However, it was ill-prepared for the recession which followed in 1990. Unlike its two main rivals, who had by then secured financial backing from larger publishers, Labovitch and Tesler had chosen to remain wholly independent. The sudden and precipitous downturn in advertising proved disastrous for the magazine and it was forced to close in May 1991 after its 103rd issue.

A large quantity of its photographic and other content is now held in the archive of the Victoria & Albert Museum.

A resurgence of interest in the fashion and design of the 1980s led to a series of retrospective events in the summer of 2013. These included the publication of a hardback book by Iain R Webb of his work for the magazine, As Seen In Blitz (ACC Publishing Group); followed by a weekend of events and talks at the ICA in London. Six of the Blitz Designer Jackets from 1986, which had been purchased by the V&A, formed part of that museum's summer 2013 exhibition Club to Catwalk: London Fashion in the 1980s. Former BLITZ publishers Carey & Simon Tesler have been involved in multiple other ventures since the magazine's closure, including the restoration of Grade I listed Georgian townhouse Parade House in Trowbridge and its relaunch as a venue for public and private events. Simon Tesler currently hosts the weekly music show Sounds on Radio Bath and podcast platforms, in which he discusses musicians and other figures interviewed by BLITZ during the 1980s.
