= Land Art Mongolia =

Art festival in Mongolia

Land Art Mongolia (LAM 360°) is a biennial art festival in Mongolia.

== History ==
Land Art Mongolia was launched in 2006 in tandem with a Land Art Symposium in Bor-Öndör. Artists from 16 countries participated.

The Land Art Mongolia event was presented during the opening of the 56th Venice Biennale.

The 2021 edition was split into two events: urban public art and land art.

Some participating artists included Yoko Ono, Marc Schmitz, Jacek Tylicki, Herman de Vries, Ai_Weiwei, among others.

== Organizer ==
MNG 360° (MNG 360° БАЙГАЛИЙН УРЛАГ МОНГОЛ) is an Ulaanbaatar based independent arts organization dedicated to raising awareness of issues such as sustainability, nomadic culture, ecological decentralization and democracy through contemporary art. Their main project is this biennial, which takes places throughout the Mongolian steppe and offers residency and an exhibit space to artists working in these fields. Marc Schmitz is the founder of the Land Art Mongolia Biennial and has served as artistic director since 2010. Marc Schmitz has been married to artist Dolgor Ser-Od since 2008.

== Editions ==
Edition	Year	Title	Curators
2nd	2012		Fumio Nanjo Anja Brietzke Rasha Ragab
4th	2016	Catching the Axis – Between the Sky and the Earth	Valentina Gioia Levy and Odgerel Odonchimed
5th	2018	Who Are We Now ?	Lewis Biggs
