= Pablo Bronstein =

Argentine artist based in London

Pablo Bronstein (born 1977, Buenos Aires) is an Argentine artist based in London. He attended Central Saint Martin's College of Art and Design, at the University of the Arts London, the Slade School of Fine Art, UCL, and graduated from Goldsmiths College of Art.

He specialises in architectural sketches in ink and gouache, set in ornate frames and depicting imagined buildings incorporating styles from 18th century France and the 1980s. His work also includes live performance: his Plaza Minuet for Tate Triennial 2006 involved choreographed movement about the gallery space by Baroque-trained dancers. He has also given an architectural tour of London.
