= Ruth Ewan =

Scottish artist

- Born: Aberdeen
- Education: Edinburgh College of Art
- Agent: Rob Tufnell

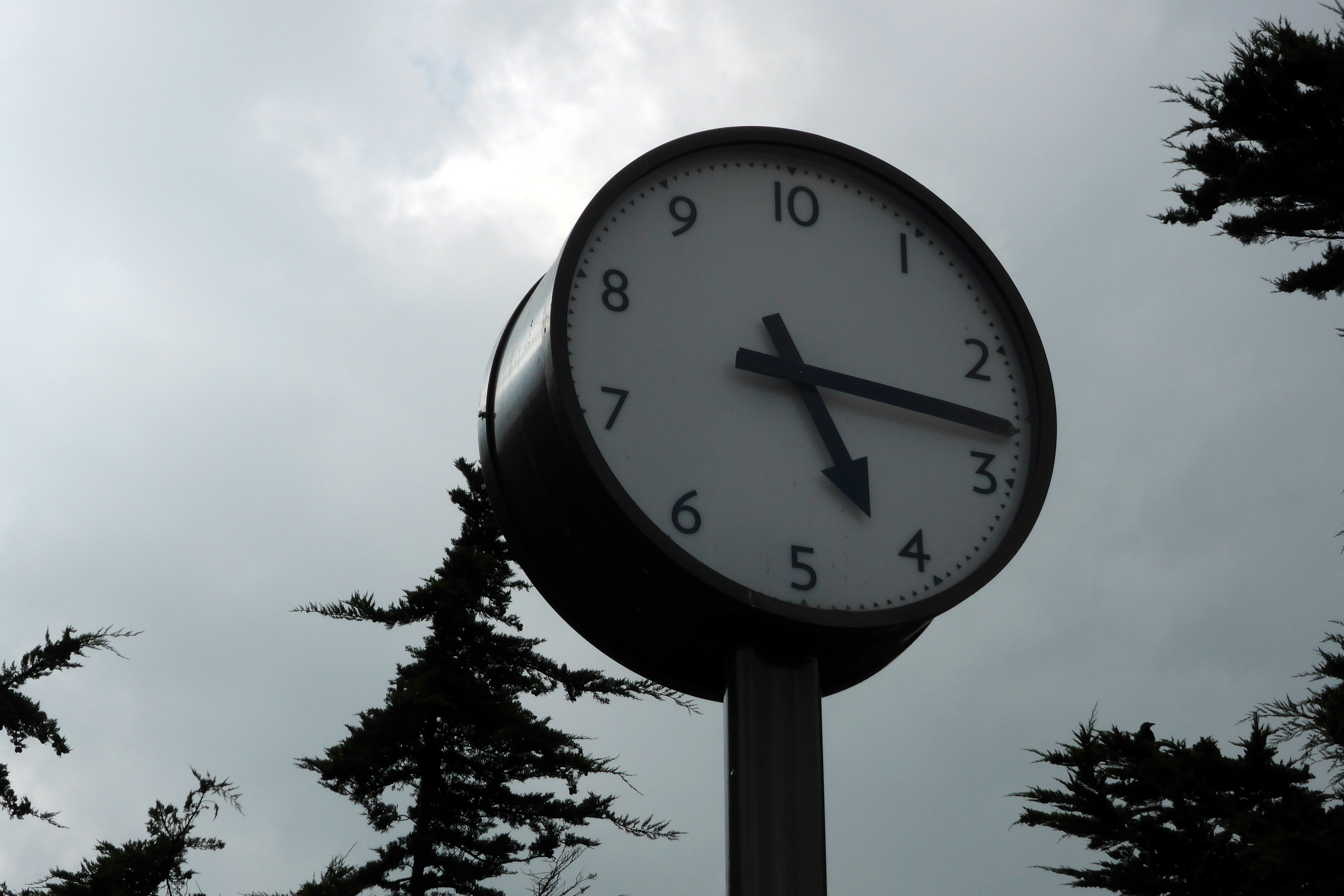
We Could Have Been Anything We Wanted To Be - Ruth Ewan Folkestone Triennial 2011

Ruth Ewan is a Scottish artist based in Glasgow, who focuses on projects looking at social movements and protests.

== Early life ==
Ruth Ewan was born in Aberdeen, Scotland, in 1980. She studied fine art at the Edinburgh College of Art, graduating in 2002.

== Exhibitions ==
- 2006: Psittaciformes Trying to Change the World Studio Voltaire, London
- 2007: Ours is the world, despite all. Northern Gallery for Contemporary Art, Sunderland
- 2007: Did you kiss the foot that kicked you, Artangel London
- 2010: Damnatio Memoriae, Arthur Boskamp-Stiftung, Hohenlockstedt, Germany
- 2011: A Lock is a Gate, Art on the Underground, London
- 2011: Brank & Heckle, Dundee Contemporary Arts, Dundee
- 2012: Ruth Ewan, Kunsthall Charlottenborg, Copenhagen
- 2013: A Revolutionary Advent Calendar, MoMA, Warsaw

== Projects ==
=== A Jukebox of People Trying to Change the World ===
In 2003 Ewan began a project that is still ongoing to create an archive of songs that carry a message about changing the world. She used her own research, and that of other people. She invites participation from others, via a section on her own website. In April 2018, it was in the Yorkshire Sculpture Park, Bothy Gallery, where some songs included references to Donald Trump.

=== We Could Have Been Anything That We Wanted to Be ===
Ewan created new clocks based on the French Republican Calendar which ran for 13 years from 5 October 1793. Each day was made up of 10 hours. The work is made up of ten clocks, and was commissioned for Folkestone's Triennial in 2011. There are two clocks which were made in addition to the initial ten, one red and one black. The red version is held by the Tate Britain, and the black by the Museum of Modern Art in Warsaw.

=== Sympathetic Magick ===
In 2018, as part of the Edinburgh Art Festival, Ewan collaborated with magician Ian Saville to commission 16 political magicians to perform at various venues through the city.

== Awards ==
- 2006: EASTinternational
- 2008: Cocheme Fellowship, Byam Shaw School of Art
- 2012: CREATE Art Award

== See also ==
- Silent Agitator
