= Paloma Varga Weisz =

Paloma Varga Weisz (born 1966) is a contemporary artist living in Germany, best known for her sculptures and drawings. In 2012, six of her drawings were acquired by and exhibited in the Museum of Modern Art. She lives and works in Düsseldorf.

== Life ==
Paloma Varga Weisz was trained as a woodcarver from 1987–90 in Garmisch-Partenkirchen. From 1990 to 1998 she studied at the Staatliche Kunstakademie Düsseldorf under Tony Cragg and Gerhard Merz. Her multifaceted practice includes sculptures and installations mainly in wood and ceramics, as well as watercolors and drawings. Angela Stief, a curator at the Kunsthalle Wien, has said of her work: "Paloma Varga Weisz’ sculptural oeuvre, characterized by obvious references to traditional iconography and handcraft, joins the historical with a contemporary artistic practice that only rarely reveals its genealogical roots."

== Awards and scholarships ==
- 2017: Holbach-Award, Stiftung zur Förderung der Kunst in der Pfalz
- 2007: Marianne-Werefkin-Preis, Berlin
- 2000/2001: Bremerhavenstipendium, Bremerhaven
