= Turbo Island =

Plot of land in Bristol, England

Coordinates: 51.4626°N 2.5901°W

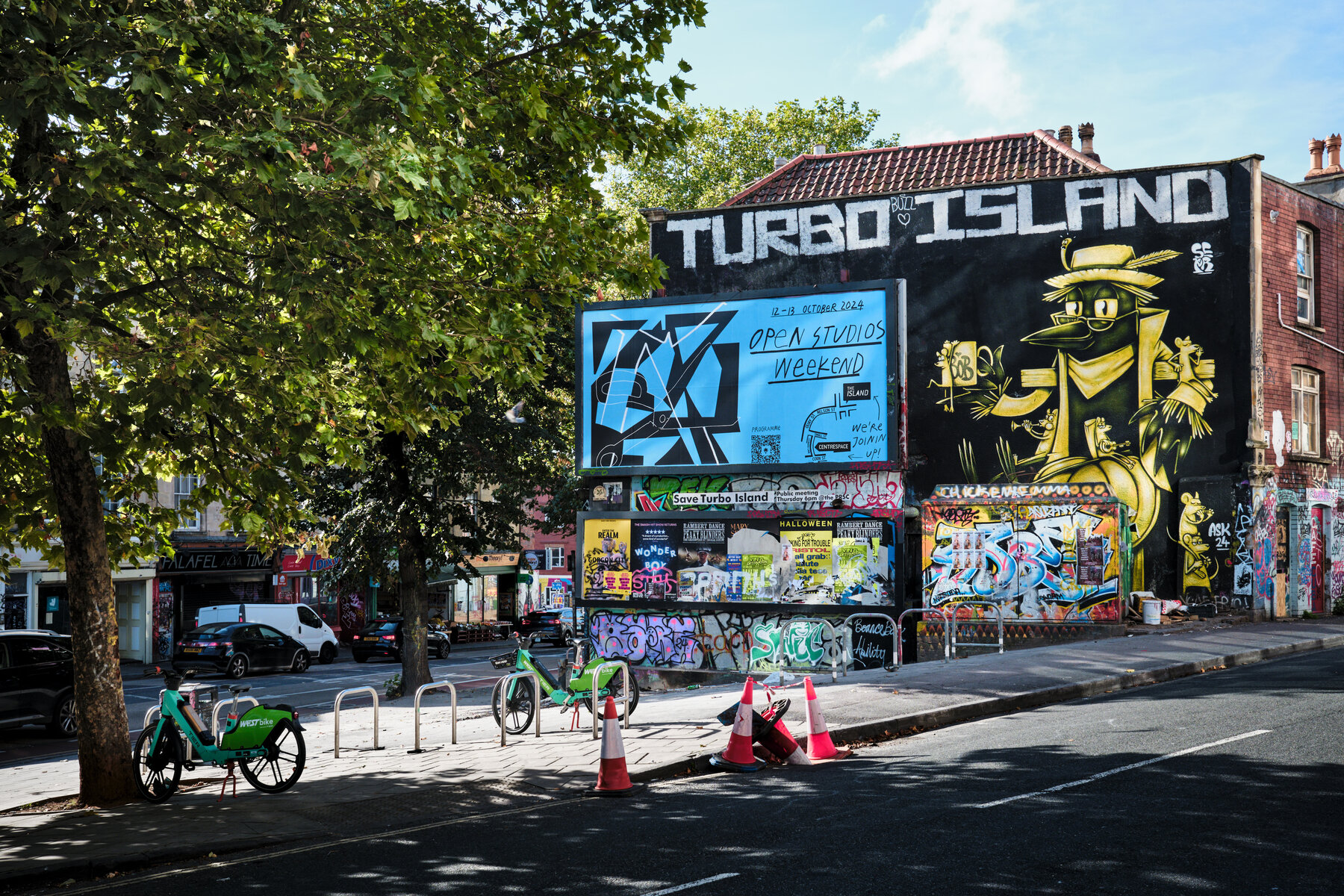
Turbo Island in September 2024, showing the advertising hoarding, the street-art wall and the cycle parking installed when the plot was tarmacked in 2022

Turbo Island is a small triangular plot of land at the junction of Stokes Croft and Jamaica Street in Bristol, England. A privately owned but informally used open space, it has for decades been a gathering place for street drinkers, homeless people, artists and partygoers, and is known for bonfires, impromptu parties and street art. It is widely regarded as a symbol of the alternative and countercultural identity of Stokes Croft, while also being a long-standing focus of complaints about anti-social behaviour.

The plot was created by bomb damage during the Bristol Blitz of the Second World War, and for much of the later 20th century carried an advertising hoarding whose rear wall became a street art canvas. Its name is generally said to derive from a cheap, strong cider associated with the street drinkers who congregated there; it is sometimes also called "Cider Island". In 2009 it was the subject of a community archaeological excavation of a "contemporary homeless place", later published in a peer-reviewed journal.

The site was surfaced with tarmac in 2022 following complaints about anti-social behaviour. When its owner put it up for sale in 2024, two campaigners applied to register it as a town or village green, a status that would have protected public access; the land was sold privately to another advertising company shortly afterwards. Following a public inquiry, Bristol City Council refused the application in October 2026, accepting an inspector's conclusion that the site had not been shown to have been used for lawful sports and pastimes by a significant number of Bristol's inhabitants throughout the required 20-year period.

== Location and description ==
Turbo Island is a roughly triangular traffic island of around 0.03 acres (120 m^{2}) on the eastern side of Stokes Croft, north of the Cabot Circus shopping development. Bristol City Council describes it as lying at "the junction of Jamaica Street, Stokes Croft and Thomas Street", while other accounts place it at the meeting of Stokes Croft, Jamaica Street and City Road. In archaeological terms it has been characterised as a "SLOAP" (space left over after planning). Part of the plot was formerly laid to grass, but this had largely worn away by the time the site was resurfaced in 2022. A large advertising hoarding and an electricity substation operated by National Grid stand along its southern side.

The site lies within the Stokes Croft Conservation Area, which was designated by Bristol City Council on 18 June 1980 and extended on 6 September 2000. The council's 2007 conservation area character appraisal explicitly names the plot as "Turbo Island" and lists it among informal open spaces that "provide some relief from the dominant built form and add to the character of the Conservation Area". A wall along one side of the plot, formerly the base of an advertising hoarding, has been used as a changing canvas for street art, and an adjacent flyposting board is used to advertise local events.

== Name ==
The origin of the name is not definitively documented. Local accounts generally attribute it to a cheap, super-strength cider associated with the street drinkers who gathered at the spot – although they do not name a specific commercial brand – with several sources dating the nickname to the 1980s; the site is also sometimes called "Cider Island".

== History ==
=== Origins ===
The plot was created by bomb damage during the Second World War. According to a 2014 archaeological study of the site, three buildings addressed 71, 73 and 75 Stokes Croft – which included a shoe shop – stood on the plot until they were struck by a German bomb during the war, around 1940, an explosion that killed a resident, Mrs Parsons. The study states that the damaged buildings were not finally cleared until a road-widening scheme in 1961, after which the resulting gap site evolved into the open space later known as Turbo Island. Popular and tourism accounts often give a simpler version, describing the site as having been created when a "shoe warehouse" was destroyed by bombing in 1940 and the empty plot then left undeveloped to preserve drivers' sightlines at the junction. A 2010 University of Bristol account noted that local stories about the site – including claims that it had been a Speakers' Corner, a place where pirates were hanged, or that it contained the remains of a bombed wartime building – were "interesting but contested".

=== Advertising hoarding and ownership ===
An advertising hoarding has stood on the plot since the mid-20th century, although sources differ on the date: community accounts variously give the 1940s or 1950s, while the 2014 archaeological study dates the hoardings to 1994. The People's Republic of Stokes Croft (PRSC), a local arts and campaign organisation, has stated that Avon County Council sold the land to an advertising company for £32,500 in the mid-1980s, some years after the 1980 conservation-area designation; a community source citing a property record instead dates the sale to December 1995, when the freehold was reportedly sold to a firm called Maiden Poster Properties for the same sum. The 2014 study records the owner at that time as the advertising firm Insite Poster Properties Ltd. In 2014 PRSC opposed an application by Insite to replace the hoarding with an internally illuminated LED sign, which it characterised as a step towards gentrification; the application was refused. According to evidence given at the 2026 public inquiry, the Insite company that owned the site was later renamed Wildstone Investments (A) Ltd, so that by the early 2020s the land was owned by Wildstone, a London-based outdoor-advertising company.

== Community use and culture ==
For decades the site has been a gathering place for homeless people and street drinkers; a 2010 University of Bristol account stated it had been frequented by them for around 40 years, and a 2024 feature in Huck dated its use as a homeless hangout to the 1960s. It has also hosted bonfires, free parties, raves and impromptu drum and bass events. Huck described it as a rare "third space" where people from different backgrounds mix. Lisa Furness of PRSC described it as somewhere "a cross section of the community could be together", while a PRSC director, Benoit Bennett, said that if "the fire goes out on Turbo, then that's radical Bristol dead".

The plot has long been associated with the Bristol street-art scene; according to the People's Republic of Stokes Croft and the Visit Stokes Croft directory, the wall has been painted by various artists, including Sepr, who painted it during a Stokes Croft arts festival in 2014. The wider Stokes Croft area is noted for its murals, including Banksy's The Mild Mild West, which is located nearby on Stokes Croft rather than on Turbo Island itself. PRSC says it began carrying out improvement work at the site around 2007.

=== Archaeological excavation ===
In December 2009 the site was the subject of a small community archaeological excavation as part of a "homeless heritage" project. The dig was led by the English Heritage archaeologist John Schofield and the urban archaeologist Rachael Kiddey, working with the University of Bristol (where Mark Horton was professor of archaeology), Avon and Somerset Police and PRSC, and was funded by the Council for British Archaeology. Homeless people took part in the dig and were described in the resulting study as "colleagues" who helped to excavate and interpret the finds, which numbered 1,063 artefacts and were dominated by alcohol bottles and items relating to drug use. The excavation was filmed for the BBC regional programme Inside Out West, broadcast on 22 February 2010, and the findings were published in 2014 in the journal Post-Medieval Archaeology.

== Anti-social behaviour and 2022 clearance ==
Because the land was privately owned, Bristol City Council had limited direct authority over activity there. Unlike many public spaces in Stokes Croft and the surrounding area, the plot is not covered by a public spaces protection order banning street drinking, which the inspector at the 2026 public inquiry said had made it "something of a magnet" for drinking. Evidence given at the inquiry indicated that use of the site by homeless people increased from around 2018–19, after measures were introduced to discourage their use of the nearby Bearpit. Following the COVID-19 lockdowns, the council and police recorded a rise in street drinking, drug use and fires at the site; Avon Fire and Rescue Service was reported to have attended Turbo Island 44 times between April and July 2022. Complaints were made to the local MP, Thangam Debbonaire, and the then Mayor of Bristol, Marvin Rees, publicly supported action to address the problems. In March 2022 the council served the landowner, Wildstone, with a written warning under the Anti-social Behaviour, Crime and Policing Act 2014 – the step that must precede a community protection notice – citing complaints about bonfires, anti-social behaviour and fly-tipping. The council described this at the time as a "community protection order", and it was widely reported as such, but the inspector at the 2026 inquiry found that no notice had in the event been served.

At a series of multi-agency meetings attended by the landowner, it was agreed that the site would be surfaced with asphalt. The plot was fenced off, and the works – which also included installing cycle parking – were carried out by the council on the landowner's behalf between 24 October and 2 November 2022; Wildstone's operations director, Philip Allard, said that the company was paying for them. The temporary fencing was repeatedly broken through while the work was under way, and fires were lit inside it. Reactions were mixed. Some nearby residents and businesses welcomed the change, with the deterioration of conditions cited as a factor in the closure of a local restaurant; one shopkeeper said it was a relief no longer to witness violence and fumes from burning plastic. PRSC and other campaigners criticised the clearance as superficial, arguing that it displaced visible poverty and homelessness rather than addressing its causes; one representative called it "a surface level clearing out of people from the city centre".

== 2024 sale ==
In August 2024, Wildstone put Turbo Island up for sale through the Bristol auctioneers Hollis Morgan, with a guide price of £50,000 and an auction scheduled for 16 October 2024. The Stokes Croft Land Trust, a community body set up by PRSC, said it had offered £100,000 for the plot but was turned down, while a separate community crowdfunding campaign aimed at raising £50,000 reached only around £2,000. Shortly before the planned auction, the land was instead sold privately for £100,000 to an initially anonymous "local" buyer.

The purchaser's identity was not made public at the time. In July 2025, Bristol City Council committee papers identified the buyer as Out of Hand, a Bristol-based print and advertising company that had held the advertising rights to the site's billboard since December 2023; it had previously denied to reporters that it had bought the land before acknowledging its ownership.

== Town and village green application ==
On 26 September 2024, after the plot had been advertised for auction, two campaigners – Benoit Bennett, a director of PRSC, and Hannah Hugh-Jones – applied to Bristol City Council, as commons registration authority, to register Turbo Island as a town or village green under section 15(2) of the Commons Act 2006, a designation that would protect public access and prevent development. The application was made by the two individuals rather than by PRSC itself. Such registration requires evidence that local people have used the land for lawful sports and pastimes for at least 20 years; the applicants argued that the site had been used for "picnics, drinking, chatting, informal meetings, parties, bonfires and barbecues" for far longer. The application was opposed by Wildstone, whose objection was maintained by Out of Hand after it bought the land; by Avon and Somerset Police; and by National Grid, which leases the part of the site on which its substation stands.

In September 2025 the barrister Douglas Edwards KC advised the council that no "trigger event", such as a relevant planning application, had occurred that would block the bid, but that the part of the plot occupied by the substation could not lawfully be registered. On 2 October 2025 the council's Public Rights of Way and Greens Committee accepted this advice and agreed to hold a public inquiry to determine the application. Figures presented in connection with the case indicated that crimes at the site had been reported to police on average about every other day during the previous year, including arson and robbery.

=== Public inquiry ===
The public inquiry, conducted by Douglas Edwards KC as inspector, opened at the St Paul's Learning Centre in Bristol on 16 June 2026 and heard evidence over two days. Witnesses for the applicants described the site's use by musicians, ravers, buskers, circus performers and charity fundraisers, and at New Year's Eve and solstice gatherings, and were cross-examined by Ross Crail, counsel for Out of Hand, about anti-social behaviour, drug use and whether homeless users counted as local inhabitants. Edwards reported having found an accumulation of litter and the remnants of a bonfire when inspecting the site the day before the inquiry opened. On the second day the objectors called Stuart Wellman, a former director of the previous owner, who said the company had avoided fencing the plot between 2007 and 2020, and Nigel Muntz, commercial director of Out of Hand, who described the site's decline from a grassed area as "a bit of a piss-take"; Daniel Bennett, counsel for the applicants, argued that under the Equality Act 2010 recreational activity must not be interpreted so as to exclude people on social grounds.

Closing legal submissions were heard remotely in early July 2026. Much of the argument concerned whether activities at Turbo Island were "lawful sports and pastimes" within the meaning of the Act: whether sound systems brought to the site fell within the statutory exception for garden fetes, morris dancing and "events of a similar nature"; whether eating fried chicken was a pastime, which Crail disputed and Bennett defended on the ground that it was "pleasurable"; and whether bonfires were an unlawful nuisance.

=== Decision ===
In a report dated 2 September 2026, Edwards recommended that the application be rejected. He accepted that the site was "well used", and that for much, if not all, of the qualifying period (September 2004 to September 2024) it had been a place where homeless and unstably housed people gathered, which he found to have been its principal use since around 2018–19. He concluded, however, that this use arose "from force of circumstance and necessity" rather than being recreational, and so was not a "sport" or "pastime". He also found that the bonfires were not a lawful pastime, since they had damaged the land and created a risk of serious harm to the public; that drug-taking was unlawful; and that drinking alcohol "to meet a dependency or to excess" was not a pastime. He judged that recreational uses such as music events, picnics, art and solstice gatherings had been no more than occasional, so that use of the site for lawful sports and pastimes had not been shown beyond a level that was "occasional and sporadic". He rejected Out of Hand's argument that homeless people should not count as "inhabitants" of the locality, finding that such a reading would wrongly prevent people without a permanent home from supporting an application.

The applicants asked the committee to reject the recommendation, arguing that the inspector's conclusions were discriminatory against homeless people and that their drinking and eating should be treated in the same way as similar activities in a wealthier setting; their statement said that "the drinking of White Cider should not be considered less favourably to the drinking of Pimm's or nice wine". The council's interim monitoring officer advised the committee that socially disadvantaged people are not, as such, a protected group under the Equality Act 2010. Muntz told the committee that Out of Hand had no plans to develop the land, but that registration "would stop any attempt at improving the site".

On 1 October 2026 the Public Rights of Way and Greens Committee, acting in a quasi-judicial capacity, voted by four votes to one, with one abstention, to accept the inspector's findings and refuse the application. Councillor Tim Kent said that the site was heavily used but that "a proportion of that use is for illegal activities", adding: "On occasion it has met the test, but occasional is not enough." The committee's vice-chair, Cam Hayward, was among councillors who agreed with the applicants that the report was discriminatory. After the decision, Bennett said that it had been difficult to gather evidence because the people who used the site were hard to trace, while Muntz said that Out of Hand would carry on using the billboard and that the decision "changes nothing really on the ground".

Days after the decision, Bristol24/7 reported that a custom-made green carpet had been laid over the plot, apparently for a game of cricket, with a circular hole cut in it so that bonfires could still be lit.
