= Anonymity in art =

Anonymity in art refers to the practice of creating, presenting, or circulating artistic works without disclosing the identity of the artist. It occurs across cultures and historical periods, from ancient and medieval artistic traditions to contemporary street art, activist collectives, and digital art communities. Anonymity may be intentional, used as a political, aesthetic, or conceptual strategy, or structural, resulting from collective production, lost authorship, or cultural norms that do not prioritize individual creators.

In contemporary discourse, anonymity in art is closely connected to debates surrounding authorship, authenticity, artistic labor, institutional power, and the commercialization of creative identity.

== Overview ==
Anonymity challenges the modern conception of the artist as a distinct, named individual whose identity is central to the interpretation and value of a work. Instead, it shifts attention toward the artwork itself, collective production, social and political meanings, or the conditions under which art is created and circulated. In some cases, anonymity enables artistic freedom; in others, it reflects historical contexts in which authorship was not recorded or valued.

== Etymology ==
The term anonymity derives from the Greek anōnumos, meaning "without a name." In art history, it encompasses both the absence of an identifiable creator and the deliberate concealment of identity. It is often distinguished from pseudonymity, in which an artist consistently works under an alternate identity, and from collective authorship, where multiple creators share authorship under a unified name or structure.

== Historical background ==
=== Pre-modern and ancient art ===
In many ancient and pre-modern societies, individual authorship was not considered central to artistic production. Artworks often served religious, ceremonial, political, or communal functions rather than expressing personal identity.

=== Ancient Egypt ===
Most Egyptian tomb paintings, sculptures, and architectural decorations were produced by workshops of artisans whose names were rarely recorded. Artistic production emphasized continuity of style, religious symbolism, and dynastic function over individual recognition.

=== Ancient Greece and Rome ===
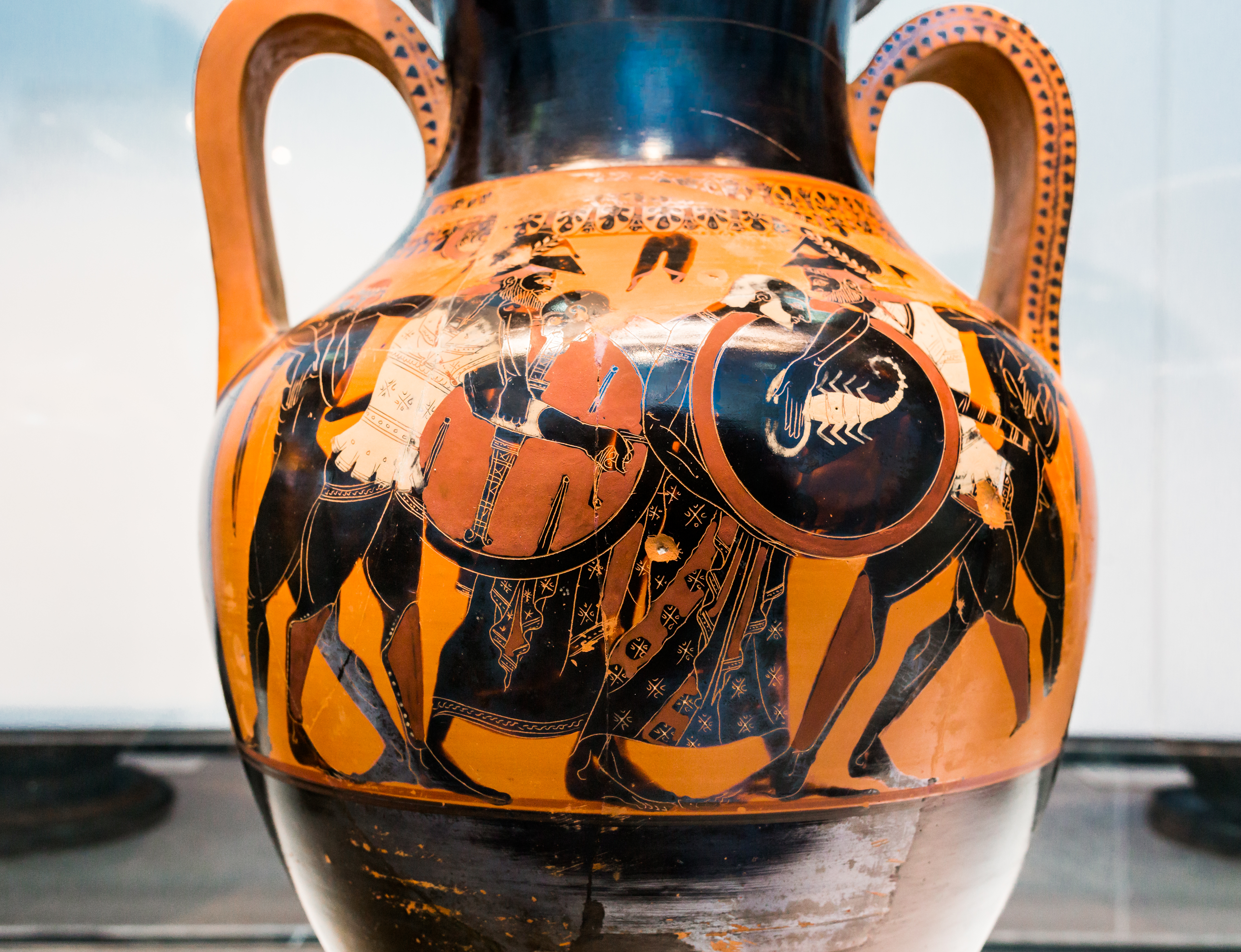
Vase Munich 1410 (Munich, Staatliche Antikensammlungen, is the name vase for the Painter of Munich 1410.

Although some sculptors and vase painters signed their works, much artistic production remained anonymous. Most ancient Greek and South Italian vase painters were defined by a name vase, as their names were unknown but their workshops were distinct. Ancient Roman wall painters were mostly anonymous, the frescoes of Pompeii and around the larger Vesuvian area were executed mainly by teams of hired painters. More works remained anonymous from late Antiquity onwards due to a combination of philosophical, religious, political, and cultural transformations that shifted attention away from the individual creator and toward divine authority, imperial power, or the artwork's religious functions.

=== Medieval Europe ===
Many medieval artworks—including illuminated manuscripts, icon paintings, mosaics, and cathedral sculptures—were produced anonymously. Gothic cathedrals, for example, were collective achievements involving architects, masons, sculptors, and craftsmen whose individual identities were often undocumented.

In Christian Europe, artistic labor was frequently understood as an act of devotion rather than personal self-expression. The spiritual function of the artwork took precedence over artistic fame.

=== Byzantine and Islamic art ===
In Byzantine iconography and many Islamic artistic traditions, anonymity reflected cultural and religious values that discouraged excessive emphasis on individual creators. Ornamentation, calligraphy, geometric design, and manuscript production often prioritized craftsmanship, continuity, and divine inspiration over personal authorship.

=== Traditional and folk art ===
Many traditional craft practices, including textile production, pottery, ritual carving, and weaving, were organized through hereditary, workshop-based, or communal systems in which skills were transmitted across generations. In these traditions, objects often embodied collective cultural knowledge and continuity, and individual attribution was frequently less significant than the identity of the community, workshop, or lineage responsible for their production.

=== Renaissance and the rise of individual authorship ===
The Renaissance marked a major shift in how artists were perceived within European society. During this period, artists increasingly moved from the status of anonymous craftsmen to celebrated intellectuals and cultural figures. Humanist ideas emphasized individual achievement, creativity, and innovation, contributing to the emergence of the artist as a distinct public identity.

Patronage systems also played an important role. Wealthy families such as the Medici family commissioned works from recognizable artists whose reputations enhanced the prestige of patrons themselves. Signatures, self-portraits, and artist biographies became more common, reinforcing the connection between artworks and individual creators.

Art historians often identify Giorgio Vasari's Lives of the Most Excellent Painters, Sculptors, and Architects (1550) as a key moment in constructing the modern idea of artistic genius. Vasari presented artists such as Leonardo da Vinci, Michelangelo, and Raphael as exceptional individual creators whose personal talents shaped the development of art history itself.

Despite this growing emphasis on individual fame, many Renaissance workshops still relied heavily on assistants and apprentices, meaning that artistic production often remained collaborative even when works were attributed to a single master. Many works still remained anonymous because of workshop production as well as lost documentation or uncertain attribution. Paintings were often catalogued as "Unknown Artist," "Workshop of," or "Follower of".

Despite this shift, anonymity continued also in the form of prints and pamphlets. Political and satirical works were often published anonymously to avoid censorship. Anonymous publication often protected artists and writers from censorship, blasphemy accusations, or political retaliation.

=== 18th–19th centuries ===
During the eighteenth and nineteenth centuries, anonymity became closely intertwined with political, social and cultural change.

- Political satire and caricature: Artists sometimes withheld their identities to criticize governments, monarchs, or social norms without legal consequences. Anonymous publication also allowed controversial works to circulate more freely among the public.
- Women artists and writers: Many women published anonymously or under male pseudonyms to overcome gender discrimination and gain access to artistic and literary institutions that often excluded female creators. Concealing their identities enabled their work to be judged more on its perceived merit than on the author's gender.
- Mass print culture: The rapid expansion of newspapers, magazines, illustrated journals, and inexpensive printed images enabled works to reach wider audiences but often weakened the connection between a work and its creator. As images and texts were reproduced, translated, and republished, authorship could become obscured, intentionally or unintentionally.

=== 20th Century and Modernism ===
During the twentieth century, modernist and avant-garde movements fundamentally challenged traditional notions of authorship, originality and artistic identity. Rather than treating the artist as the sole creative authority, many artists experimented with anonymity, pseudonyms, collective production, and mechanical processes to question the relationship between creator and artwork.

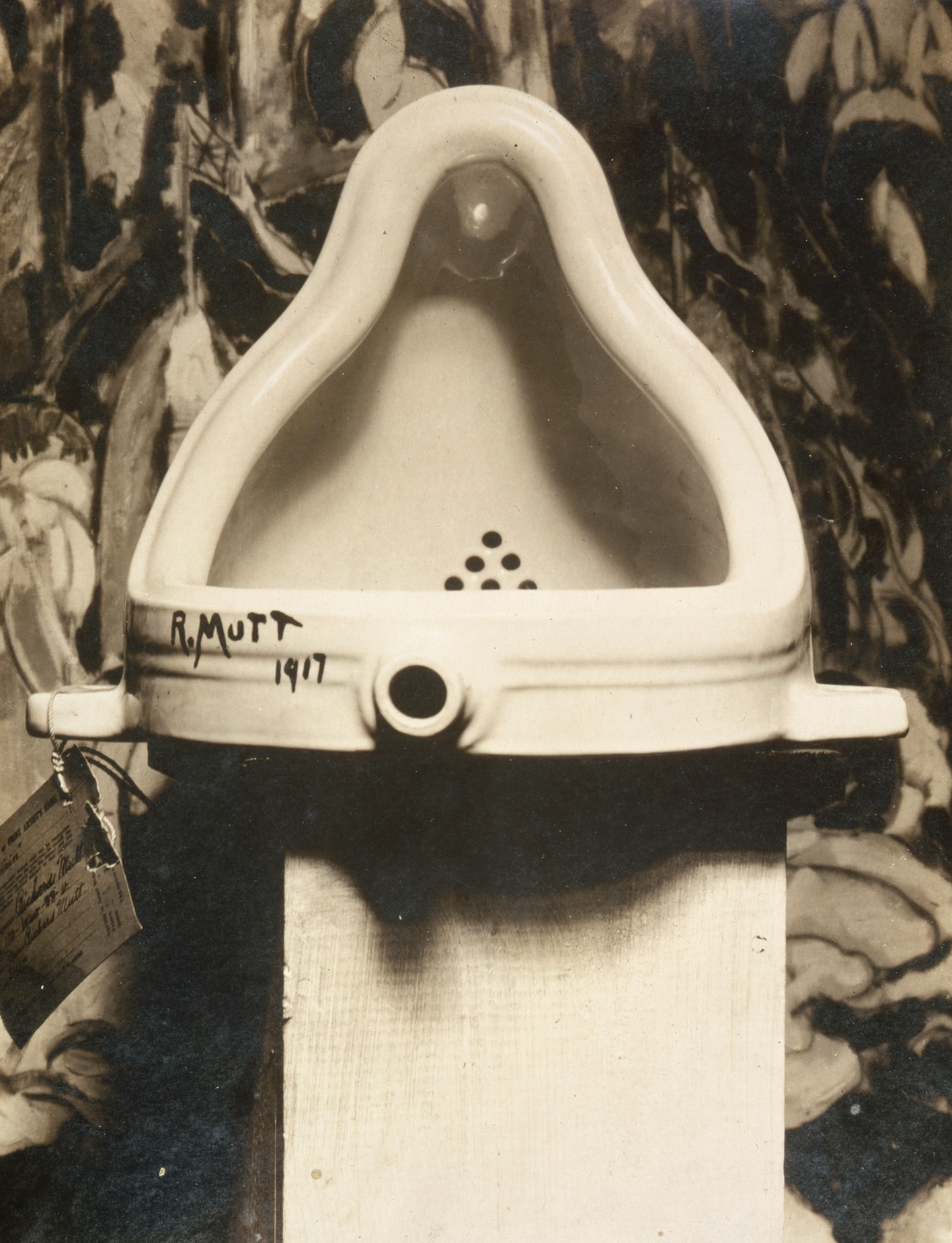
- Marcel Duchamp Fountain, 1917, signed R. Mutt, photograph by Alfred Stieglitz
  Marcel Duchamp: Duchamp submitted his 1917 readymade Fountain under the pseudonym "R. Mutt," challenging the idea that artistic value depends on the identity or reputation of the artist. His use of pseudonyms and ready-mades shifted attention from manual craftsmanship to artistic concept and institutional context. Beginning in 1920, Duchamp adopted the female alter ego Rrose Sélavy (also spelled Rose Sélavy), a fictional persona that functioned as far more than a simple pseudonym. Through photographs by Man Ray, signed artworks, writings and performances, Duchamp presented Rrose Sélavy as an independent artistic identity. The persona became one of the earliest and most influential examples of anonymity and identity performance in modern art.
- Dada and Surrealism: Artists associated with Dada and Surrealism embraced chance, collective authorship, automatic drawing and writing and collaborative practices that deliberately diminished individual artistic control. Collaborative works such as the Exquisite Corpse (Cadavre Exquis) were created by multiple artists without any one participant controlling the final image, challenging the notion of singular artistic authorship. These methods questioned the Romantic ideal of the artist as a unique creative genius and emphasized unconscious processes, experimentation and shared creativity.
- Andy Warhol and the Factory: Andy Warhol blurred authorship through The Factory, where assistants participated in producing paintings, prints, films, and other works under his name. By adopting industrial methods, mechanical reproduction, and serial production, Warhol challenged conventional distinctions between the individual artist, the artwork and mass-produced commodities.
- Situationist International: Members of the Situationist International often emphasized collective authorship over individual artistic identity. Their publications, manifestos and artistic interventions minimized personal attribution, reflecting the movement's rejection of the commercialization of art and the cult of the individual artist.
- Yves Klein: French artist Yves Klein deliberately obscured authorship in works such as the Anthropometries, where nude models applied paint to canvases under his direction. Klein presented himself as the orchestrator rather than the physical maker of the artwork, challenging traditional assumptions about artistic labor and authorship.
- Fluxus: Following Duchamp, Dada, Surrealism and Warhol, the Fluxus movement continued to pursue collaborative, anti-authorial practices in the 1960s. Fluxus movement collaboration, participatory events, and works that could be performed by anyone rather than attributed to a single creator. Many Fluxus projects blurred the boundaries between artist and audience, emphasizing process over individual authorship.

=== Late 20th century to the present ===
Since the late twentieth century, anonymity has evolved from a historical condition into a deliberate artistic strategy. Contemporary artists often conceal their identities to challenge traditional ideas of authorship, resist commercialization, avoid legal consequences, or shift attention from the individual creator to the artwork's social and political message. The rise of street art, activist collectives, and digital culture has made anonymity an increasingly visible feature of contemporary artistic practice.

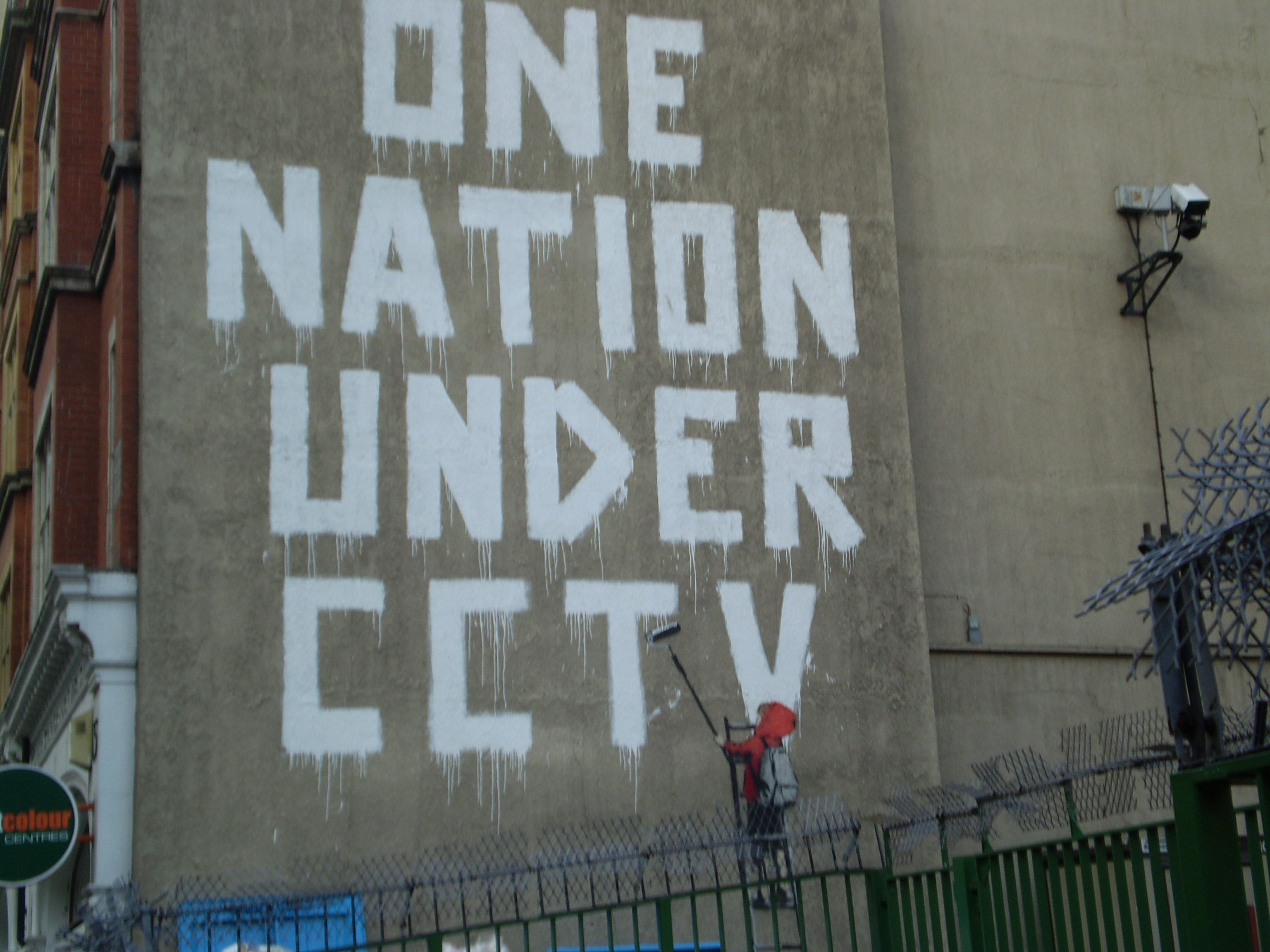
- Banksy graffiti on Newman Street, London - One Nation Under CCTV
  Street art: Anonymity often serves both practical and conceptual purposes in street art and graffiti. Artists such as Banksy have maintained concealed identities to evade prosecution for unauthorized public interventions while reinforcing the political and anti-establishment nature of their work. Similarly, Invader remains anonymous while installing mosaic artworks in public spaces around the world, allowing the works themselves to take precedence over the artist's personal identity. "Jerkface" is an anonymous New York-based street artist known for vibrant murals and paintings that appropriate and reinterpret characters from popular culture, including cartoons, comic books, and video games. By concealing his identity, Jerkface shifts attention away from his personal biography and maintains privacy.
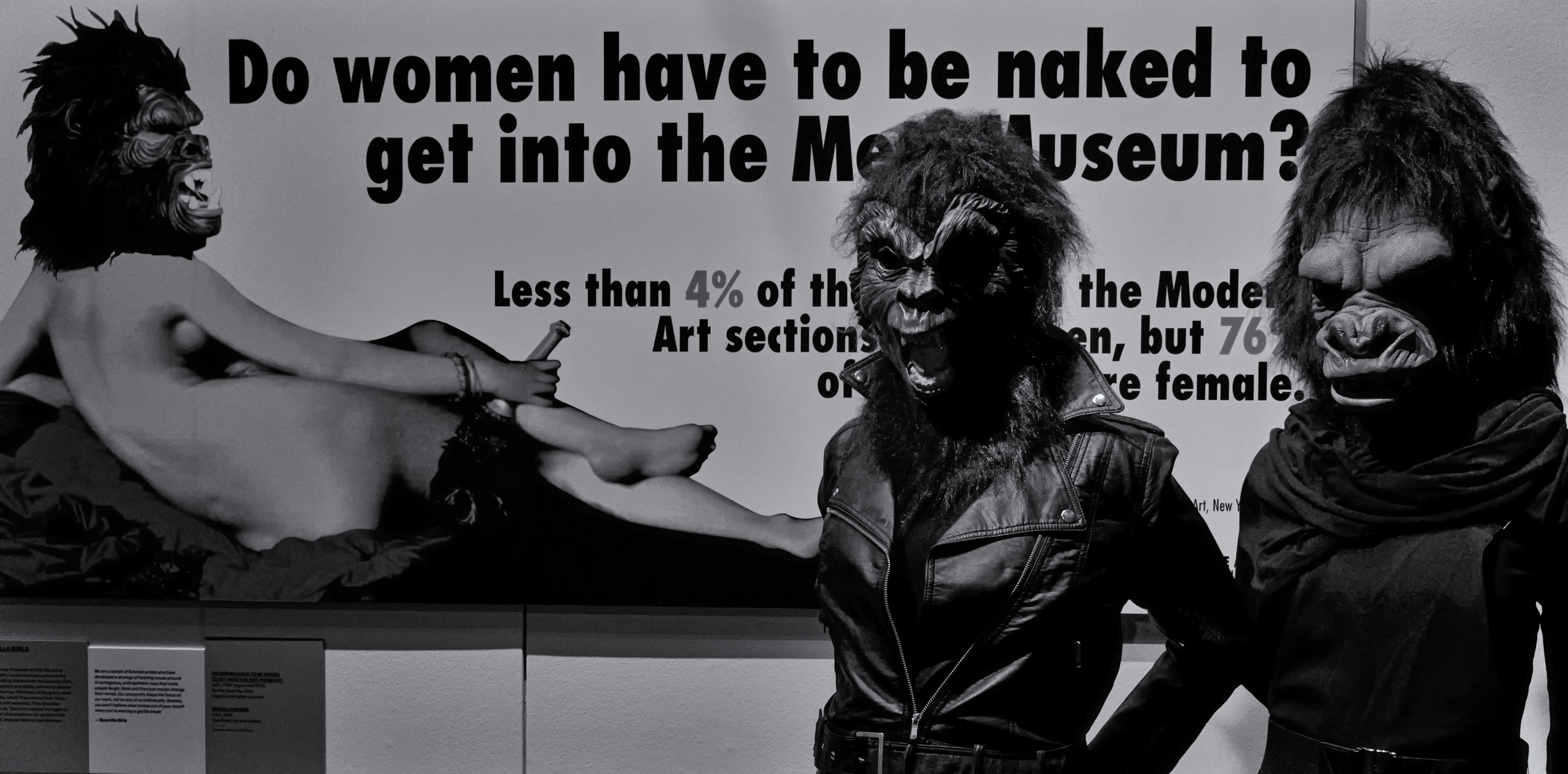
- Members of Guerrilla Girls in front of one of their first works, exhibited at the Victoria and Albert Museum.
  Art collectives: Anonymity has also become a powerful tool for activist art collectives. Guerrilla Girls use gorilla masks and the names of deceased women artists to expose gender and racial inequalities within museums, galleries, and the broader art world. Likewise, The Yes Men employ pseudonyms, impersonation, and concealed identities in performance-based interventions that critique corporate and political institutions. Founded in New York in 2001, the Bruce High Quality Foundation is an anonymous artists' collective whose members deliberately conceal their individual identities and present themselves under the fictional persona of "Bruce High Quality," whom they describe as a deceased artist.
- XCOPY, A Coin for the Ferryman (2018). The associated NFT was one of the most expensive NFTs sold in 2021
  Digital and online art: The expansion of the internet has transformed anonymous artistic production. Digital artists working through online platforms, algorithmic systems and blockchain technologies frequently adopt pseudonyms or anonymous identities, while collaborative and decentralized creative practices challenge traditional notions of singular authorship. The rise of crypto art and NFTs has further enabled artists such as Pak (Murat Pak) and XCOPY to achieve commercial success without revealing their real identities.

== Anonymity in the art market ==
Anonymity has long shaped the production, circulation, and valuation of art. It has become a strategic feature of the modern art market, influencing authenticity, scarcity, pricing, and public perception. Although anonymous authorship can reduce value by limiting attribution, it can also increase desirability through mystery and media attention. As a result, an artwork's value depends not only on its artistic quality but also on provenance, authenticity, historical context and public narrative.

=== Authentication and attribution ===
Because anonymity creates uncertainty regarding authorship, attribution has become a specialized field involving art historians, conservators, scientific analysis and provenance research. Technical methods such as pigment analysis, dendrochronology, infrared reflectography, X-radiography and artificial intelligence assist experts in identifying anonymous works or confirming disputed attributions.

Changes in attribution can dramatically affect market value. A painting reclassified from "anonymous" to an autograph work by a celebrated artist may increase in value by several orders of magnitude, while the reverse may substantially reduce its price.

- Leonardo da Vinci – Salvator Mundi: Long believed to be the work of an anonymous follower or workshop, the painting was reattributed to Leonardo da Vinci after extensive conservation and expert study. It sold for US$450.3 million at auction in 2017, becoming the most expensive painting ever sold.
- Cimabue – Christ Mocked: A small devotional panel discovered in a French home was initially unrecognized. Following expert examination, it was attributed to the 13th-century Italian master Cimabue and sold for approximately €24 million in 2019, demonstrating the transformative effect of attribution.
- Caravaggio – Judith and Holofernes (Toulouse painting): Discovered in an attic in France in 2014, the painting generated intense scholarly debate over whether it was an original by Caravaggio or the work of his follower Louis Finson. Although its attribution remains disputed, the discovery highlighted the market significance of anonymous works that may be linked to major masters.

=== Mystery and market demand ===
In the contemporary art market, anonymity can itself become a source of value. By concealing his identity, Banksy transformed anonymity into a central component of his artistic brand. The mystery surrounding the artist has contributed significantly to media attention, public fascination, and market demand. Despite the unknown identity, Banksy's works have sold for millions of dollars at auction.

One of the most notable examples occurred in 2018 when Girl with Balloon was sold at Sotheby's immediately before partially self-destructing through a hidden shredding mechanism concealed within its frame. The work was subsequently renamed Love Is in the Bin and later resold for a substantially higher price, illustrating how anonymity, performance and market spectacle can collectively enhance value.

A widely publicized 2026 investigation identified Banksy as Robin Gunningham (later legally David Jones). Contrary to speculation that revealing the artist's identity would diminish the value of his work by removing its mystery, the market remained resilient. Shortly after the revelation, Girl With Balloon on Found Landscape (2012) sold for US$18 million, becoming one of the highest auction prices achieved for a Banksy work. Collector demand extended beyond the artist's concealed identity, while anonymity may have played a significant role in establishing Banksy's myth, the market had come to value not only the mystery but also the artist's cultural influence, established brand and institutional recognition.

=== Crypto art and NFT ===
In the traditional art market, authenticity often depends on signatures, catalogues raisonnés, galleries and experts. In the NFT market, authenticity is established through blockchain records and smart contracts. Anonymity becomes less of a commercial obstacle and, in some cases, a branding advantage. Artists can sell directly to collectors, bypassing galleries and auction houses that traditionally verify artists' identities. Anonymous artists can reach international collectors without geographic or institutional barriers.

- Pak: Despite their identity remaining unknown, Pak's NFT works have generated hundreds of millions of dollars in sales, including The Merge (2021), which sold for approximately US$91.8 million, making it one of the most expensive works by a living artist.
- XCOPY: Another unknown digital artist, has sold NFTs for millions of dollars while maintaining a largely anonymous public identity.

=== Anonymous buyers, sellers and collectors ===
In addition to artistic anonymity, anonymity in the art market also involves buyers, sellers, collectors and ownership structures. Confidentiality has long been a feature of the international art trade, where transactions frequently occur through intermediaries, private dealers, or auction houses.

Major auction houses such as Sotheby's or Christie's often permit anonymous bidding, with buyers represented by paddle numbers or bidding through agents. This practice is intended to protect client privacy and reduce external pressures during sales. For example, during the auction of Leonardo da Vinci's Salvator Mundi, the successful bidder remained anonymous. It was later reported that the painting had been acquired on behalf of the Saudi crown prince Mohammed bin Salman.

Similarly, collectors may choose to conceal their identities for reasons of personal security, financial discretion, or to avoid influencing market perceptions of particular artists or artworks. Private collectors often acquire works through advisors or intermediary companies rather than in their own names. For many years, the buyer of Edvard Munch's The Scream, sold at auction in 2012 for nearly US$120 million, remained unidentified until businessman Leon Black publicly acknowledged that he had purchased the work.

Sellers may also remain anonymous to avoid affecting market prices or revealing financial circumstances. For example, estates, museums undertaking deaccessioning and prominent private collectors frequently sell works through auction houses without publicly identifying themselves before the sale.

Ownership structures such as trusts, offshore companies, and freeports can further obscure the identity of art owners. The so-called Panama Papers and Pandora Papers revealed numerous instances in which artworks were owned through offshore entities, making beneficial ownership difficult to trace. Likewise, the Geneva Freeport has become well known for storing high-value artworks under conditions that provide confidentiality and tax advantages. While these arrangements can serve legitimate purposes such as estate planning, tax efficiency, and security, they have also raised concerns about secrecy, tax avoidance, money laundering, sanctions evasion, and the use of art as a financial asset rather than a cultural object.

== Theoretical Perspectives ==
Scholars have connected anonymity in art to broader debates about authorship and interpretation.

- Roland Barthes, in The Death of the Author (1967), argued that meaning is produced by the reader rather than determined by the creator. He maintained that separating a work from the intentions or biography of its author allows for a plurality of interpretations.
- Michel Foucault, in What Is an Author? (1969), introduced the concept of the "author function," describing authorship as a cultural construct that shapes how works are categorized, interpreted and valued. He argued that the identity of the author serves a classificatory role, influencing how texts and artworks are understood within institutions and culture.
- Arjun Appadurai, in The Social Life of Things (1986), examined how objects circulate within changing "regimes of value," where authorship may be less central than context, exchange and use. His framework suggests that the significance of artworks can shift as they move through different social, economic and cultural settings, regardless of the identity of their makers.

== See also ==
- Anonymity
- Authorship
- Pseudonymity
- Collective authorship
- Street art
- Graffiti
- Conceptual art
- Digital art
- Anonymous artists
- List of anonymous masters
- List of anonymously published works
