= David Vijsma =

Dutch visual artist and photographer

David Vijsma (Haarlem, c. 1968) is a Dutch visual artist and photographer. In his work, he utilizes digital glitch techniques and artificial intelligence.

== Career ==
=== Early work and glitch art ===
Vijsma has been active as an artist since 1985, initially working as a fine art painter and photographer. Since 2014, he has applied glitch techniques to digital images. In this process, he uses the audio software Audacity to import and edit photo files as sound files, resulting in visual distortions. Using this method, he produced a series of portraits of Formula One drivers.

In October 2018, following the self-shredding of Banksy's Girl with Balloon, Vijsma created an artwork responding to the event. The deconstruction of the piece aligned with Vijsma's artistic focus on databending and fragmented media.

In December 2021, five of Vijsma's Formule 1 glitch art paintings were stolen from an exhibition at the NH Hotel Schiphol Airport in Hoofddorp.

== Exhibitions ==
In 2023, Vijsma participated in the exhibition Artistic Impact at Kunst Centrum Haarlem. His work was displayed there alongside digital images from the Dead End AI Gallery. In connection with this exhibition, Vijsma created a video series in which he held conversations with figures from the art sector about the impact of AI on copyright and the definition of originality.
