= Pulp Fiction (Banksy) =

Work by stencil graffiti artist Banksy

Coordinates: 51.5260°N 0.0864°W

- Artist: Banksy
- Year: 2002
- Preceded by: The Mild Mild West
- Followed by: Gorilla in a Pink Mask

Pulp Fiction is a series of related works by stencil graffiti artist Banksy. Instances of it depict the characters played by Samuel L. Jackson and John Travolta in the 1994 film Pulp Fiction, with their guns replaced by bananas. A stencil graffiti work existed on a wall near the Old Street tube station in the City of London from 2002 to 2007. Prints of the image had been sold for more than £1,000 on the original site. A print of the Pulp Fiction stencil was sold for £10,600 in 2012. On 24 November 2020, a signed print has fetched £125,000 at Tate Ward Auctions' "By Collectors for Collectors" event.

== Studio release ==
In 2004, a silkscreen print version of the motif was released by publishers Pictures on Walls consisting of a signed edition of 150 and an unsigned edition of 600.

== See also ==
- List of works by Banksy
- List of works by Banksy that have been damaged or destroyed
