= Westmoreland House =

Demolished office building in Bristol, England

Coordinates: 51.4639°N 2.5894°W

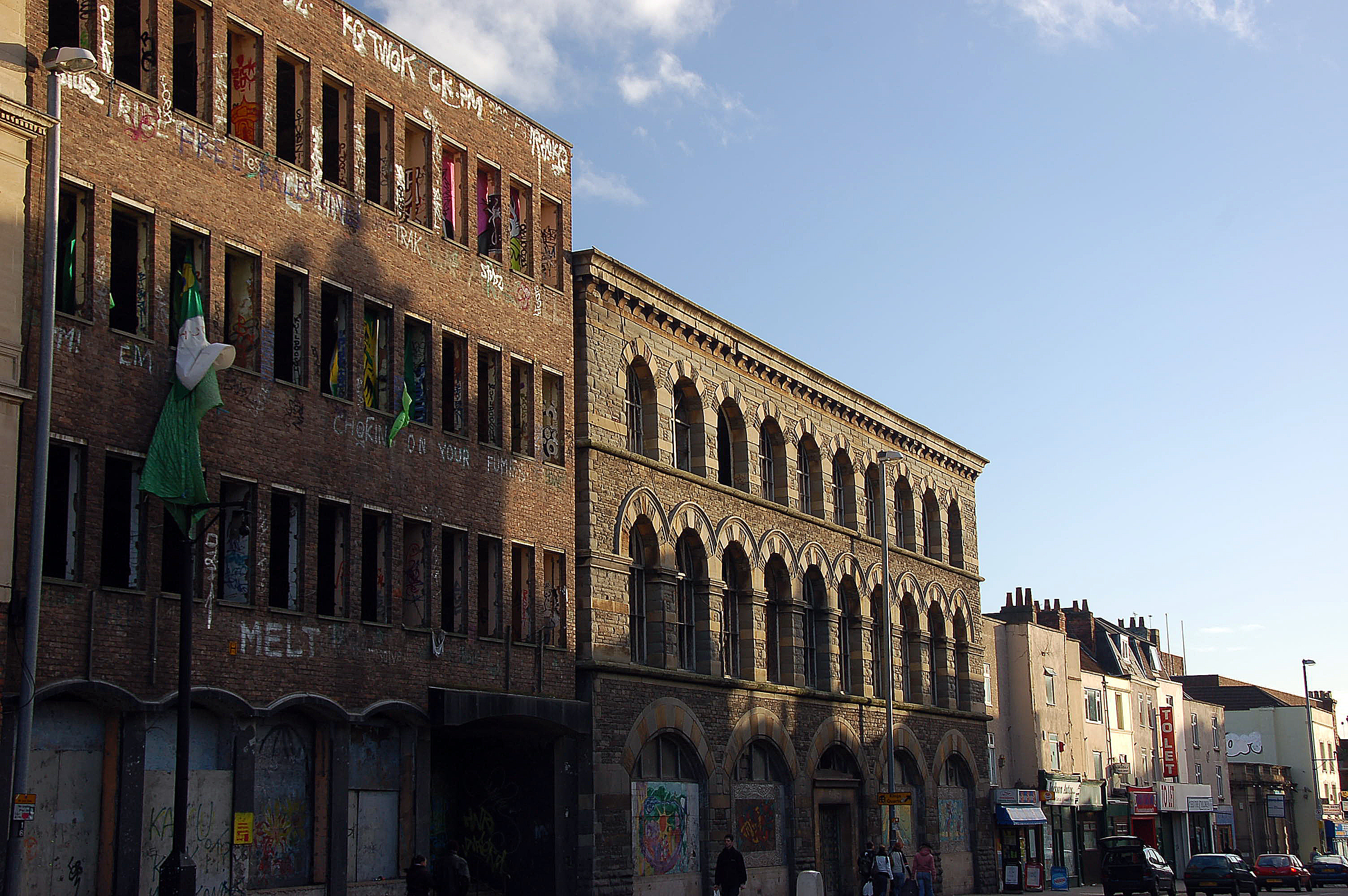
Westmorland House in 2006, with the Carriage Works next door to the right.

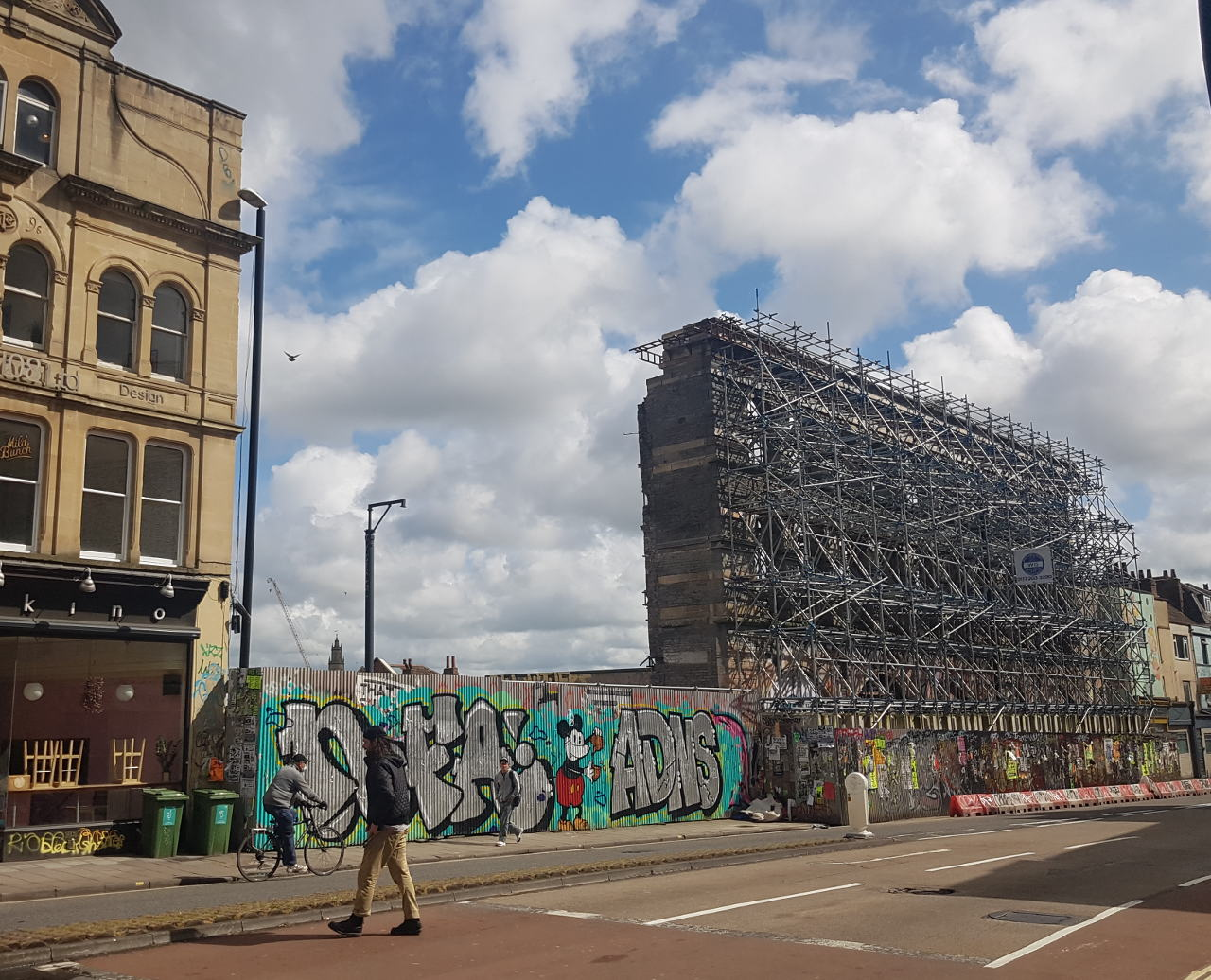
Site of Westmorland House in 2020, with the facade of the demolished Carriage Works, next door, held in place by scaffolding.

Westmoreland House was a building at Nos. 104–106 Stokes Croft, Bristol, next door to the Carriage Works.

== History ==
The building was opened in January 1966 by Lady Westmorland (wife of David Fane, 15th Earl of Westmorland) which it was named after. It was built to house the headquarters of the Regional Pools Promotions. Regional Pools Promotions (RPP) was a membership scheme through which members could win prizes. Members paid a shilling a week subscription. Tuppence (2d) of this was sent charity Scope, then called the Spastics Society. Members were part of the “Spastics League Club” and it was known at the time as “The Spastics Pool”. The club and headquarters closed in 1982 after they were unable to pay a £250,000 tax bill, and the building was not legally occupied until its demolition.

Following the closure of the Spastics League Club, Westmorland House became increasingly derelict and a popular place for graffiti artists to display artwork. This has led to English Heritage classifying the whole Stokes Croft conservation area "at risk". The premises was bought by Comer Homes for redevelopment in 1989, but plans stalled after they were unable to agree with the city council on how to proceed. The building was planned to be redeveloped by the South West Regional Development Agency, but plans were cancelled in 2009 following budget cuts. From 2007, local community group People's Republic of Stokes Croft led initiatives to envisage the redevelopment of the site as a community asset.

In 2014, the Mayor of Bristol announced Westmorland House would be demolished, while the neighbouring Carriage Works would be spared and turned into flats as it is a Grade II* listed building. Local residents, who enjoy the diversity and anticommercial nature of Stokes Croft were unimpressed with the plans and hoped something more inspiring could be designed. Campaign material against the redevelopment was posted to the front of Westmorland House, including a hand-painted sign on the former main entrance that reads "No to luxury flats – yes to affordable homes"

Demolition of Westmorland House was scheduled to begin in July 2018, but delayed owing to the discovery of asbestos. It finally began on 21 November.
