= If You Don't Mask, You Don't Get =

2020 artwork by Banksy

- Artist: Banksy
- Condition: Destroyed
- Location: London, United Kingdom
- Preceded by: Painting for Saints
- Followed by: Hula Hooping Girl

If You Don't Mask, You Don't Get was a mural created by Banksy in 2020. The artwork, inspired by the COVID-19 pandemic, was removed due to Transport for London's anti-graffiti policy.

== Background ==
Banksy posed as a cleaner in order to paint the mural inside a London Underground carriage. The title is thought to be a play on words for the saying "If you don't ask, you don't get." Other slogans linked to the UK band Chumbawamba were used in the mural.

== See also ==
- List of works by Banksy
