= King Robbo =

English underground graffiti artist (1969–2014)

King Robbo WRH
- Born: John Robertson; 23 October 1969; England, United Kingdom
- Died: 31 July 2014 (aged 44); London, England, UK
- Known for: Art
- Notable work: Robbo Incorporated
- Movement: Graffiti
- Website: teamrobbo.org

King Robbo (born John Robertson, 23 October 1969 – 31 July 2014) was an English underground graffiti artist. His feud with the artist Banksy was the subject of a Channel 4 television documentary called Graffiti Wars, first shown in August 2011.

== Early works ==
Robbo painted his first train in 1985 and with WRH (We Rock Hard) created graffiti throughout the London Underground network with his crew members, DOZE, P.I.C, PRIME AND CHOCI.

== Feud with Banksy ==
Graffiti in Camden after modification by Banksy and Robbo

In 1985, 15-year-old Robbo painted a graffiti work under the British Transport Police headquarters on a wall beside Regent's Canal in Camden, London, which was only accessible by water. A large full colour graffiti piece, called "Robbo Incorporated", it had over the years become one of the oldest pieces of graffiti in London.

Over time, virtually all of his works had been gradually removed from London's trains and walls by authorities except for this piece. By 2009, Robbo Incorporated had become completely obscured under other graffiti painted over it. In that year, the English stencil artist Banksy converted it into a picture of a workman pasting wallpaper of Robbo's damaged work, replacing more than half of the damaged original in the process.

Robbo stated that Banksy was introduced to him for the first time in the 1990s, commenting: "I was at a place called the Dragon Bar on Old Street. I was introduced to a couple of guys who were like '[W]hoa it's nice to meet you!' When I was introduced to Banksy, I went 'Oh yeah I've heard of you mate, how you doing?' and he went '[W]ell I've never heard of you' ... he dismissed me as a nobody, as nothing. So with that I slapped him and went '[O]h what you ain't heard of me? [Y]ou won't forget me now will you?' [A]nd with that he picked up his glasses and ran off."

On Christmas Day 2009, Robbo reclaimed his piece from Banksy's defacing by covering the work so Banksy's workman appeared to be painting "KING ROBBO" in silver letters. Three days later the letters "FUC" appeared before the word "KING". Tit-for-tat overpainting continued at the site with artwork and insults including a picture of Top Cat leaning on a gravestone with the words "R.I.P. Banksy's career".

This incident led to online arguments and a graffiti war with many of Banksy's other works being altered by "Team Robbo"—notable ones including the piece Hitchhiker to Anywhere where the "anywhere" was changed to "going nowhere".

In 2014, LDNGraffiti published an illustrated timeline of the feud.

In 2015, Banksy included a piece dedicated to Robbo in the Dismaland exhibition.

== Injury, coma and death ==
On 2 April 2011, Robbo sustained a life-threatening head injury five days prior to his exhibition at the Signal Gallery, Shoreditch: "Team Robbo—The Sell Out Tour". It is believed the injury happened as a result of an accidental fall. Robbo was found in a pool of blood at the bottom of 10 stairs outside his flat in King's Cross.

In November 2011, three months after the airing of the Channel 4 documentary Graffiti Wars, the Camden Robbo mural was painted over with a black and white depiction of the original with the additions of a crown and a can of spray paint with a hazard symbol of a flame above it. It was painted by Banksy as "a tribute to him and as an effort to end the feud in a sense of lighting a candle for Robbo who was still in comatose condition".

The mural was restored to its original form with slight changes by the other members of "Team Robbo" on 24 December 2011, Christmas Eve. The restoration has since peeled away to leave the black and white tribute to Robbo, as of September 2012.

King Robbo died on 31 July 2014, having never recovered from his original injury or regained consciousness.

== See also ==
- Blek le Rat
- List of urban artists
- Street art
- Works by Banksy damaged or destroyed
