= Greenwashed Tree =

2024 mural by Banksy

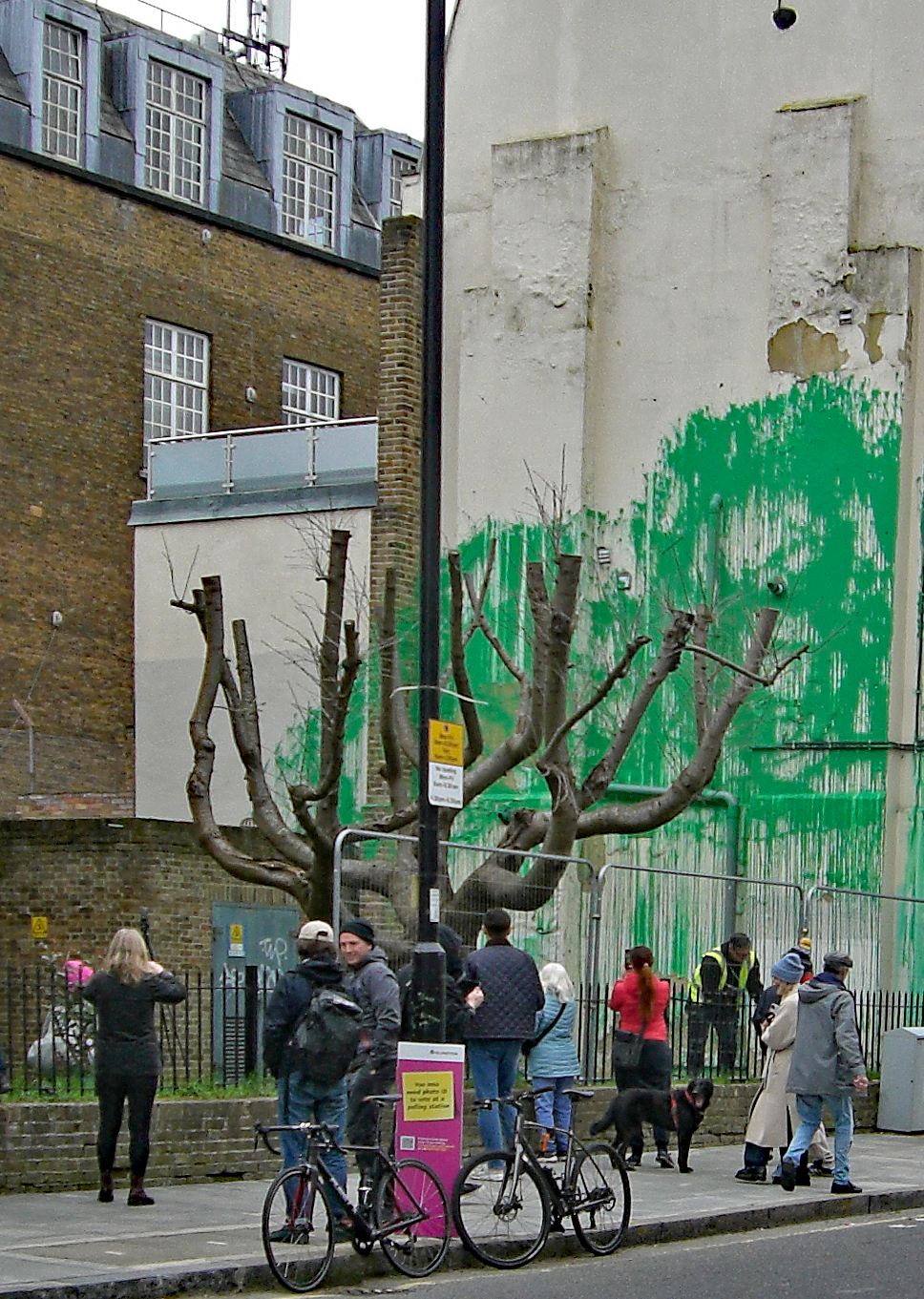
- Crowds gathering around the mural
- Artist: Banksy
- Year: 2024
- Medium: Paint
- Location: Hornsey Road, London; 51.564687°N 0.119510°W

Greenwashed Tree is a 2024 mural by graffiti artist Banksy. It appeared on the side of a building on Hornsey Road in north London during the early morning of 18 March 2024, with Banksy confirming it to be his work shortly after.

== Description ==
The mural uses green paint to depict the leaves of a tree, with a figure standing below depicted holding a paint sprayer. The mural is positioned on the side of a residential building behind a tree that had recently been heavily pollarded. The mural was installed on the night of St Patrick's Day, known for its association with the colour green.

== Response ==
Commenters suggested the work was a criticism on the excessive pruning that had been undertaken on the tree. Others, including Jeremy Corbyn, saw the work as a broader criticism on the damage being done to the environment. Further still, that the work is a criticism of greenwashing, a term for misleading claims of environmentally-friendly practices for marketing purposes. Other potential issues commenters saw the mural as aiming to confront include the general lack of greenery in certain urban areas.

Within days of being put up, the mural was vandalised with white paint, and protective fences were put in place, followed by plastic and boards by the building's owner. A spokesperson for Islington Council announced plans to install protection that would still allow public viewing of the mural. As of 2026, the mural remains visible and protected, although damaged.

== See also ==
- List of works by Banksy
- List of works by Banksy that have been damaged or destroyed
