= Hula Hooping Girl =

2020 artwork by Banksy

- Artist: Banksy
- Location: Nottingham, United Kingdom
- Preceded by: If You Don't Mask, You Don't Get
- Followed by: Create Escape

Hula Hooping Girl is a piece of street art, created by Banksy. On 13 October 2020, it appeared on a wall in Nottingham, England. Media reports followed the appearance of the artwork that is had been created by Banksy. On October 17, Banksy claimed the artwork after posting a picture of it on his Instagram account.

== Artwork ==
The work is painted onto a wall at the side of a beauty salon in Nottingham. It depicts a young girl hula-hooping with a bicycle tire, next to a bicycle that is missing its rear wheel, attached to a nearby signpost.

As with many Banksy artworks, it was vandalised a couple of days after the artist posted it on his Instagram. On 22 November 2020, the bicycle that made up part of the work had been removed from the signpost. By the next day, it had been replaced with a different bicycle, without a rear wheel, in the same location.

== See also ==
- List of works by Banksy
- List of works by Banksy that have been damaged or destroyed
