= Carriage Works, Bristol =

Listed building in Bristol, England

Carriage Works
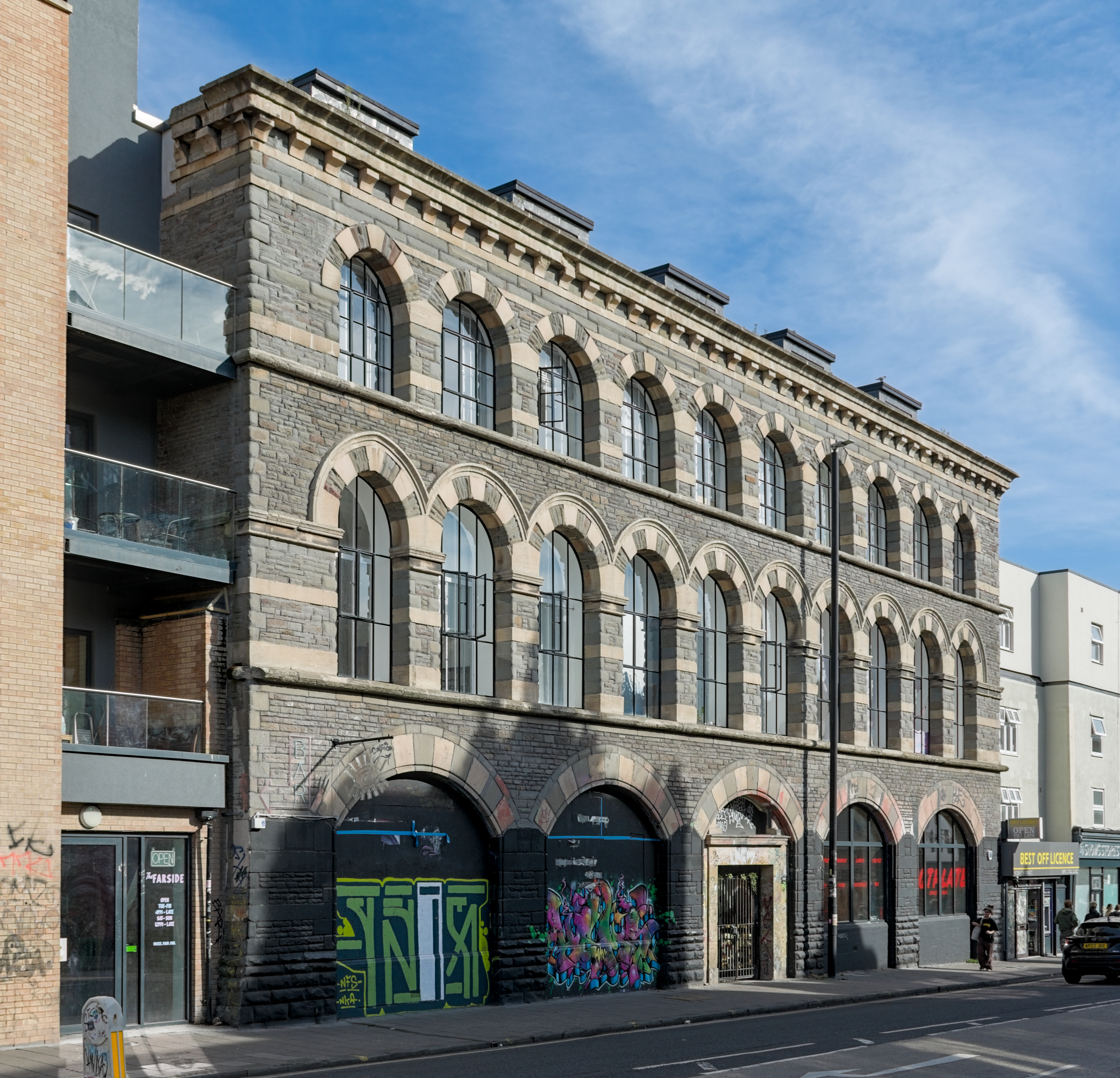
- The Carriage Works in 2025

- Location within Bristol

General information
- Location: Bristol, England
- Coordinates: 51.4640°N 2.5894°W
- Completed: 1862

Design and construction
- Architect: Edward William Godwin

Listed Building – Grade II*
- Official name: The Carriage Works
- Designated: 1 November 1966
- Reference no.: 1084256

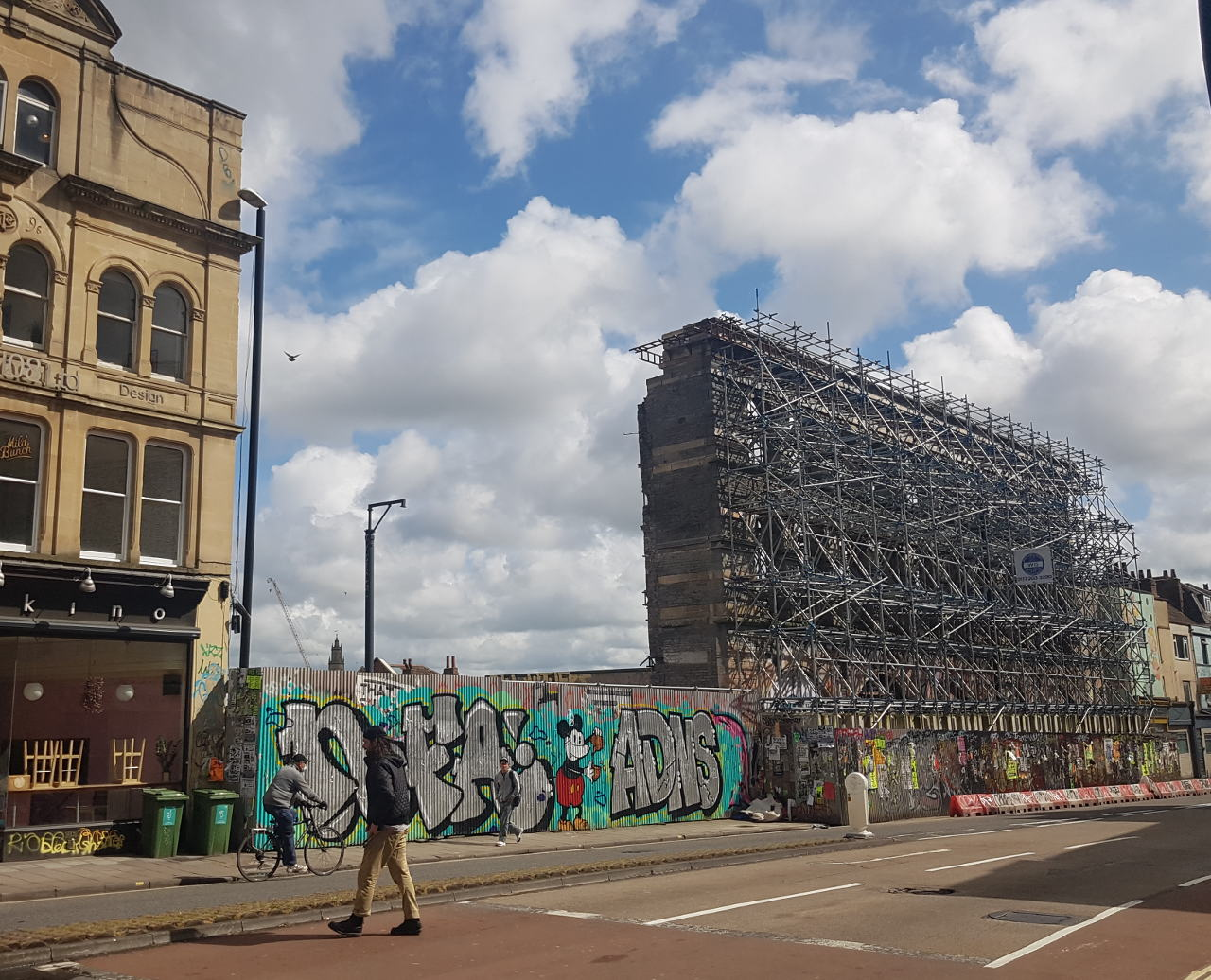
In 2020 all that remained of the Carriage Works was the facade, held in place by extensive scaffolding.

The Carriage Works is a historic building known for its distinctive Bristol Byzantine architectural style, located in Stokes Croft, Bristol, England.

== History ==
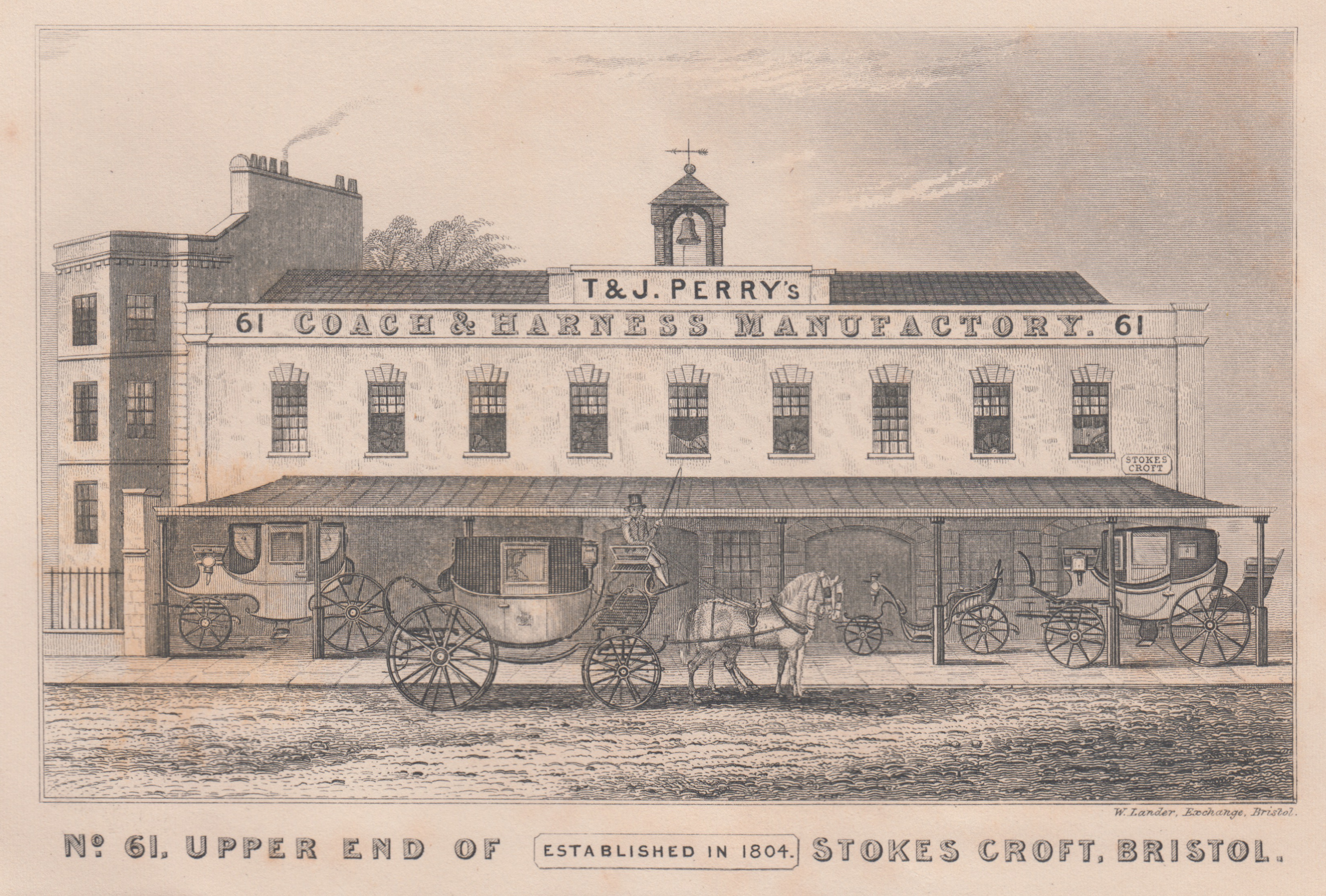
Advert for T & J. Perry's Coach & Harness Manufactory, Stokes Croft, Bristol, 1842

The Carriage Works was built in 1862 by Edward William Godwin from Pennant stone with Bath stone dressings. It replaced an earlier Coach & Harness Manufactory, owned by T & J. Perry's, established in 1804. The new building has round arched arcades above double width segmental arches. The ground floor arches were originally open for access by John Perry and Sons' carriages. In 1844 Thomas and John Perry paid £3 per year to rent the site. By the beginning of the 20th century, Perry's had modernised from horse carriages to include the manufacture of cars at the site. From 1913 until the 1960s, the building was used to process rubber by the Anderson's Bristol Rubber Co. Ltd. In the 1960s it was home to Regional Pools Promotions, a membership scheme which gave prizes and raised money for charity, and later moved next door to Westmoreland House.

The building has been designated by English Heritage as a Grade II* listed building. The building, which is an example of the Bristol Byzantine style, is on the English Heritage Buildings at Risk Register and described as being in very bad condition.

In September 2011, the Carriageworks Action Group was launched to develop community ideas for the future of the building, the neighbouring Westmoreland House and the land behind. The Action Group is made up of local residents, organisations and businesses, supported by Bristol City Council, and proposes to write a 'community vision' for the site.

In June 2013 a housing association, Knightstone Housing, was named as the preferred developer. In 2015 a planning application was made to Bristol City Council by Fifth Capital to develop the site for a mixed use scheme including 112 homes and designed by Assael Architecture. This was approved in October 2015, despite concerns about the lack of affordable housing included in the scheme.

Demolition of the bulk of the Carriage Works, and the adjacent Westmoreland House began on 21 November 2018. The facade of the building has been retained.

== See also ==
- Grade II* listed buildings in Bristol
- Westmoreland House
