= List of works by Banksy that have been damaged or destroyed =

This is a list of damaged or destroyed works of guerrilla art created by England-based street artist Banksy, which have been removed from their original locations or otherwise damaged or destroyed.

== Removed from their original locations ==
- Cave art hoax with accompanying exhibit label, which was hung on a wall in the British Museum, and removed after two or three days and subsequently accessioned; in 2005.
- Two works jetwashed away and a third work, of a boy holding a stereo and a teddy bear, the subject of legal action opposing its ablation by Hackney Council in order "to keep streets clean", in Dalston, London; in 2009.
- Vulture with fuel pump head on side of a container at Dungeness beach, Kent stolen in early September 2010.
- Rat, stolen from an electricity meter box outside the home of a well-known underwear designer in Melbourne, claimed to be by Banksy; the authenticity of this work was questioned, with some calling it a fake; in 2010.
- Mickey Mouse-inspired Livin' the Dream, removed from Sunset Boulevard, Los Angeles and destroyed; in 2011.
- Mural entitled Caution, detached from a wall in Boyle Heights, Los Angeles; in 2011.
- Parachuting Rat in Melbourne, Australia was accidentally destroyed in May 2012 by builders installing new plumbing.
- Slave Labour, a 2012 mural depicting a child making union flag bunting and regarded as a critical social commentary on the Queen's Diamond Jubilee, prised from the wall of a Poundland shop in Wood Green, Haringey, North London in "mysterious circumstances" on 13 February 2013. An attempt to sell it in the US 10 days later, at the Fine Arts Auction Miami art house on 23 February, was halted at the last minute after Haringey residents began a campaign for its return.
- No Ball Games, a 2009 mural depicting two children playing catch with a sign saying "No Ball Games", was removed from a wall in Tottenham, Haringey, north London in July 2013. It was cut into three pieces, restored and then sold in April 2014 at an exhibition titled "The Stealing Banksy". The Sincura Group, the company that had also placed the Slave Labour mural up for sale, stated that the mural had "not been appreciated in situ". Local residents and councillors were disappointed by its removal.
- In April 2014, Mobile Lovers in Bristol (painted onto plyboard) was removed by crowbar, and resided in Broad Plains Boys Club. Banksy confirmed that the club was entitled to claim ownership of the piece in a letter. The Broad Plains Boys Club sold Mobile Lovers for £403,000 to a private collector in order to keep the club running.
- A mural depicting a soldier with the face of a Lego figure was detached from its original location at Schleifmühlgasse, Vienna, Austria.
- A painting of the "Grim Reaper" originally located on the side of The Thekla in Bristol was removed as it was decaying. It is now on a long-term display at the M Shed.
- The artwork Spy Booth in Cheltenham, England – said to be a critique of the Global surveillance disclosures of 2013, was removed and possibly destroyed in August 2016 by persons unknown. This was despite it having gained grade II listed status and retrospective planning permission making its removal illegal. The current whereabouts and condition of the artwork is unknown.
- A painting of a child with a crowbar on London Road North in Lowestoft from A Great British Spraycation was removed from its wall in November 2021, a few months after its installation.
- A stop sign with what looks like three military drones on it was removed less than an hour after its unveiling.
- A mural of a howling wolf on a satellite dish in Peckham, London was stolen hours after it was put on display.
- On 10 August 2024, a mural featuring a stretching cat on a decaying plywood billboard in Cricklewood, London was removed hours after its unveiling.
- Yellow Line Flower Painter was removed from the wall of Bethnal Green Working Men's Club, London, in October 2019. The ownership of the mural is the subject of a legal dispute.

== Concealed or defaced ==
- In March 2007 one of Banksy's early pieces, a 25 ft (7.6 m)-long artwork featuring a collection of blue shapes with the artist's trademark tag, on the side of garages in Albion Road, Easton, Bristol, was mistakenly painted over by graffiti-removal contractors Nordic. They had been asked by Bristol City Council to tackle graffiti adjacent to the Banksy work, but wrongly targeted the piece itself. Within days someone sprayed the words "Wot no Banksy?" over the contractors' plain paintwork.
- In April 2007 Banksy's famous 2002 piece depicting John Travolta and Samuel L. Jackson's Pulp Fiction characters pointing bananas instead of guns, on a wall near Old Street station in London, was painted over by Transport for London workmen despite having an estimated value of more than £300,000 at the time. Asked to comment on the mural's destruction, a Transport for London spokesman said "Our graffiti removal teams are staffed by professional cleaners not professional art critics."
- In April 2007 a four-year-old 25 ft (7.6 m)-long wall mural in Cato Street, Easton, Bristol, marketed for sale with its attached house (at 21 Milvart Street) included was subsequently defaced with red paint. Celebrities had previously expressed interest in buying the work, and the gallery owner contacted Banksy for permission to restore the work. Banksy however declined the offer, stating that overwriting and defacement was an inevitable reality of street art.
- In November 2007 a mural of a policeman stopping and searching a young girl in Glastonbury, created in connection with the Glastonbury Festival, was whitewashed over.
- In 2008 The Little Diver or Diving Bell, previously protected with a Perspex sheet by Melbourne City Council in Australia, incensing many street artists, was covered with silver paint poured behind the sheet and later tagged with the slogan "Banksy woz ere". The image was almost completely obliterated.

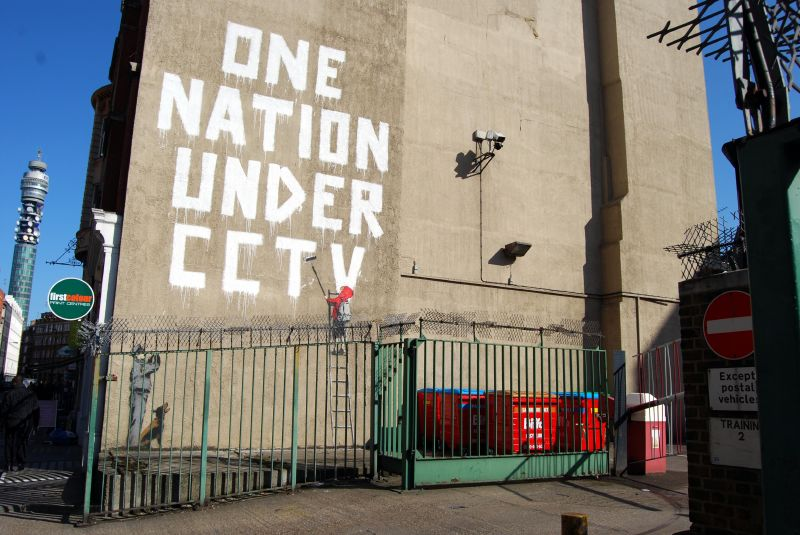
One Nation Under CCTV in 2008

- In April 2009 One Nation Under CCTV, an April 2008 mural, was abated after Westminster City Council had stated in October 2008 that it would remove any graffiti, regardless of the reputation of its creator.
- On 22 June 2009, Well Hung Lover, on the side of Brook Sexual Health Clinic in Park Street, Bristol, and voted for retention by 93% of the public in a 2006 council poll, was spattered with blue paint in an overnight paint bomb attack.
- One of Banksy's earliest, best known and most prominent works, The Mild Mild West, featuring a teddy bear throwing a Molotov cocktail at police, located on the side of a building in Cheltenham Road, Bristol, was twice defaced with paint during 2009. It was cleaned up both times, but was damaged in the process; the paint used to attack it is still visible.
- In September 2009 a mural of the British royal family, featured on the cover of a single by Blur, was accidentally painted over by workmen employed by Hackney Council, London.
- Parachuting Rat, one of the last surviving examples of Banksy's Melbourne street art, was accidentally painted over by council contractors in March 2010.
- In February 2011 a mural behind Westwood Village Urban Outfitters in Westwood Village, Los Angeles, depicting a child holding a machine gun loaded with coloured crayons, was defaced with black paint, just days before the 83rd Academy Awards for which Banksy's documentary film Exit Through The Gift Shop had been nominated.
- In May 2011 a Banksy piece drawn in October 2010 around an extractor fan on the Grosvenor Hotel in Torquay, Devon was destroyed. It depicted a child drawing a robot. Within a week of its appearance the owners announced plans to cover it with protective Perspex amid newspaper speculation that it had increased the value of the property by £150,000. Vandals smashed the Perspex screen on 31 May 2011 to attack the mural with paint stripper, removing the image of the child.
- In July 2011 Gorilla in a Pink Mask (also known as Gorilla with Pink Face Mask) in Fishponds Road, Eastville, Bristol, was painted over by the new owner of the building, who was unaware of Banksy's reputation or the value of the artwork. The mural was partly restored.
- In October 2011, Banksy's Sniper on Upper Maudlin Street, Bristol was vandalised by graffiti artists apparently supporting King Robbo, spraying the words "Team Robbo" in black spray paint.
- In 2011 a Banksy work in Boston Massachusetts's Chinatown was graffitied and partially painted over.
- On 31 December 2013 Praying Boy, located just off of Main Street in Park City, Utah, United States, was vandalized with spray paint. The piece was originally created by Banksy in January 2010 during the Sundance Film Festival. Banksy was in Park City promoting his documentary Exit Through The Gift Shop, which was featured in the festival. Praying Boy was vandalized by California artist David Noll, who claimed mental health issues led to his actions. He smashed a glass case meant to protect the piece and defaced the artwork. He also attempted to vandalize another Banksy piece in the area depicting a videographer, but was unable to break through that work's protective case. Noll pled guilty to a third-degree felony count of criminal mischief, was assigned community service, given five years probation, and was ordered to pay restitution to the building's owners. He apologized in court for the vandalism. The piece was restored by painting conservator Deborah Uhl, resulting in 70 hours of work from January through April 2014.
- In August 2013 the Banksy work that was defaced in 2011, depicting a child drawing a robot at the Grosvenor Hotel in Torquay, Devon was covered up by the hotel owners as an attempt to stop vandals doing more damage. In 2012 the image of the boy was damaged by vandals throwing acid on it, all that remained was the robot. The robot has now been boarded up and preserved underneath, the hotel owners claim.
- Several other Banksy works in New York City were defaced in October 2013.
- In October 2014, an "Anti-immigration birds" mural was painted over after Clacton-on-Sea's local council received a complaint; it was not then known that the work was Banksy's.
- In February 2015 a Bomb Hugger stencil Banksy sprayed 2002 in Hamburg was destroyed by the paint that dripped down from a graffiti above.
- On 15 October 2015, a work painted by Banksy in Harringay, London depicting Turkish President Recep Tayyip Erdogan and his son Necmettin Bilal Erdoğan, portrayed as thieves running off with a big sack full of money, was partially painted over, covering both of their faces.
- In January 2016, The Son of a Migrant from Syria, the Banksy mural at the entrance to the former Calais Jungle refugee camp which depicted Apple founder Steve Jobs as a refugee, was defaced with the words "LONDON CALLiNG", with Jobs' body taking the place of the i; the body of the i was not painted but the dot was, partially, covering Jobs' head; further defacement has followed.
- In 2018, the Astronaut was painted over, Moon Street, Bristol. Streetview
- In September 2018, a shop shutter mural on Park Row, Bristol, credited as being made by Banksy in the 1990s—prior to his stencil art period—was partially painted over by new tenants who were unaware of its origins. The building was previously a skate shop, the owner of which Banksy was friends with.
- In August 2019, a Banksy mural depicting a worker chiselling away one of the Flag of Europe's gold stars–a reference to the on-going Brexit situation in the UK–was found to have been painted over with white paint and covered in scaffolding. The building upon which the artwork appeared had, at the time, been scheduled for demolition.
- In February 2020, Valentine's Banksy, a work depicting a young girl firing a slingshot of flowers, was defaced just days after being created.
- In April 2020, someone added a large surgical mask to Banksy's Girl with a Pierced Eardrum mural in Bristol's Harbourside in reference to the coronavirus pandemic.
- In October 2020, a mural called Hula Hooping Girl appeared in Nottingham, alongside a bike with a missing tire. On 20 November 2020, the bike was removed from the site of the mural. It was unclear whether it was removed by Nottingham City Council or was stolen. On 22 November, a replacement bike was put in place. However, as the bike model and bike lock are different from the originals, it is unclear if this was replaced by the council, a member of the public or Banksy himself.
- Between 24 and 26 December 2020, two Banksy murals in New Orleans, Umbrella Girl and The Gray Ghost, were vandalized. Holes were cut into the plastic coverings protecting the pieces and the artworks were tagged "Team Robbo" and "King Robbo" by red spray paint. Someone had spray painted "Cantrel" on the Umbrella Girl a few weeks earlier, and there was an attempt to steal it in 2014.
- Between 15 and 16 March 2021, a Banksy mural in Reading was vandalised by Graffiti artists that support King Robbo spraying Team Robbo with red spray paint.
- In May 2024, a called Greenwashed Tree was defaced with white paint within two days of its creation.
- In August 2024, a mural of a rhinoceros, appearing to mount an abandoned Nissan Micra with a traffic cone on its bonnet in Charlton, London was marked with a white dollar symbol and letter V tag by a 'random youth' shortly after its creation.

== Demolished or erased ==
- The New Pollution in St Werburghs, Bristol, was knocked down in 2006 by developers in order to build a new block of flats.
- No Loitrin originally on Essex Street in Cambridge, Massachusetts; was removed by sandblasting.
- In July 2020, Banksy painted a series of sneezing rats on a Circle Line train on the London Underground. These were removed by cleaners for violating TFL's anti-graffiti policies.
- On 8 September 2025, Banksy claimed credit for a mural on the Royal Courts of Justice in London. It was covered the same day and removed over 9–10 September, leaving a recognisable silhouette.

== Better Out Than In ==
Most of the works that make up the October 2013 Better Out Than In series in New York City have been defaced or destroyed, some just hours after the piece was unveiled.

- At least one defacement was identified as done by a competing artist, OMAR NYC, who spray-painted over Banksy's red mylar balloon piece in Red Hook. OMAR NYC also defaced some of Banksy's work in May 2010.
- On 2 October 2013, on Allen Street in New York City's Chinatown, one of Banksy's works that was part of Better Out Than In was painted over, the day after Banksy unveiled the piece.
- On 7 October 2013, at the intersection of New York City's Bowery and Delancey streets on the Lower East Side, a stencil by Banksy was tagged over by three vandals.

As a result of the continued defacement, fans have been rushing to the sites of the installments as soon as they are announced. A group of men took advantage of this and threatened to deface a stencil painting of a beaver in East New York, charging money for people to take photographs. The continued defacement has prompted some to take matters into their own hands by guarding the works, others restoring them once defaced. Property owners have also gone to some measures to protect the art, including hiring 24-hour guards and installing roll down gates that cover the art.

== Girl with Balloon transformed into Love Is in the Bin ==
A framed copy of Girl with Balloon was sold for $1.4 million at a Sotheby's auction in London on 5 October 2018. Immediately after the auction ended, a mechanism hidden in the frame was triggered by remote control and partially shredded the piece. Banksy later explained that he had built the shredder into the painting several years before it went up for auction, and named the new artwork created by the shredding Love Is in the Bin.

== The Outlaws ==
In the sixth episode the 2021 BBC One/Amazon Prime Video comedy The Outlaws the character Frank, played by Christopher Walken, paints over an image of a stencilled rat sitting on two spray cans signed by Banksy while cleaning a graffiti-covered wall as part of his Community Payback sentence. The BBC have confirmed that the artwork was an original piece created by Banksy for the sitcom, and that it was genuinely destroyed by Walken when he painted over it.

== See also ==
- Iconoclasm
- List of works by Banksy
