= ANT 82, Blue Age Anthropometry =

Painting by Yves Klein

- Artist: Yves Klein
- Year: 1960
- Medium: Pure pigment and synthetic resin on paper mounted on canvas
- Dimensions: 156.5 cm × 282.5 cm (61.6 in × 111.2 in)
- Location: Musée National d'Art Moderne, Paris

ANT 82, Blue Age Anthropometry (original French title ANT 82, Anthropométrie de l'époque bleue) is a painting by French artist Yves Klein, created in 1960. Purchased in 1984, this work is part of the collection of the Musée National d'Art Moderne, in Paris.

== History and description ==
Anthropometry is the term invented by French art historian Pierre Restany, from the Greek words anthropos (man), and metry (measurement), to name what he called “the technique of living brushes”, which originated paintings as the result of performances carried out in public with models whose bodies were coated with paint and applied to the pictorial support.

The current painting was created in 1960 by Yves Klein, and is one of the canvases in the "Anthropometries" series, which are prints of naked women's bodies, smeared with pure pigment and synthetic resin of blue colour on paper mounted on a white canvas. Elena Palumbo Mosca also collaborated on it. This work can be associated with primitivism or with Nouveau réalisme. This work was created as part of a live performance. There are some videos extant of this event.
