= Gorilla in a Pink Mask =

2011 graffiti by Banksy

- Artist: Banksy
- Year: 2001/02
- Medium: Graffiti
- Subject: Gorilla

Gorilla in a Pink Mask is an early graffiti work by Banksy. It originated in 2001 or 2002.

Monkeys are a recurring motif in Banksy's works. They can be found listening to music on headphones or in one case preparing to detonate a bomb. The artist uses them to portray both famous and everyday people, drawing parallels between humans and their closest relatives in the animal kingdom. Alongside Banksy's recurring subjects, which include rats and police, he frequently uses monkeys to critique power, corruption, and consumerism.

Gorilla in a Pink Mask is believed to be the first time he used a primate, making it a precursor to Devolved Parliament, in 2009, a work in oil that depicts chimpanzees and some orangutans debating in the House of Commons. Other works have included Laugh Now, in 2003, which showed a row of apes with aprons with the inscription “Laugh now, but one day we'll be in charge” and Monkey Queen, in 2003, where one is used as a stand-in for Queen Elizabeth II.

Named variously as Masked Gorilla, Glitter Gorilla and Pink Gorilla, the work is most commonly called Gorilla in a Pink Mask. It first appeared on the wall of the former North Bristol Social Club in Fishponds Road, Eastville, Bristol. This later became the Jalalabad Islamic Centre. In 2011, the gorilla and other graffiti on the wall was painted over by the building's owner, who was unaware of its history.

In September 2020, the section of wall containing the artwork was removed from the centre with permission from the art restoration company Exposed Walls, which now owns the work.

== See also ==
- List of works by Banksy
- Works by Banksy that have been damaged or destroyed
