= The Mild Mild West =

Mural by Banksy in Bristol, England

Coordinates: 51.4629°N 2.5896°W

- Artist: Banksy
- Year: 1999
- Type: Mural
- Location: Bristol, United Kingdom
- Followed by: Pulp Fiction

The Mild Mild West is a 1999 mural by graffiti artist Banksy, sited on No. 80 Stokes Croft, Bristol. It depicts a teddy bear throwing a Molotov cocktail at three riot police.

== History ==
Banksy painted the artwork over three days in broad daylight in 1999. It was painted in response to various unlicensed raves and parties held in abandoned warehouses around Bristol in the 1990s that drew attention from the police. A specific trigger for the mural was such an event at Winterstoke Road, New Year's Eve 1997/1998, where riot police began to attack partygoers.

The artwork is popular with the local community who consider it a good symbol of the heritage around Stokes Croft. It has been cited as an archetypal piece of Bristol culture, showing how a relaxed hippie can still fight back against the government and commercialisation.

In April 2009, the artwork was vandalised with red paint by an anti-graffiti organisation called Appropriate Media, but was quickly repaired. Bristol City Council announced plans to enclose the mural in glass in front of new flats, which was criticised by the local community because it would make it harder to see from the street. Coexist, an organisation managing regeneration of Stokes Croft, did not understand the vandalism. Their spokesman said, "I don't see how spraying red paint is helping with the positive change" and was happy that volunteers quickly came together to repair it.

== See also ==
- 1999 in art
- List of works by Banksy
- Works by Banksy that have been damaged or destroyed
