= Love Is in the Bin =

2018 art intervention from a 2006 Banksy painting

Love is in the Bin
- Girl with Balloon
- Artist: Banksy
- Year: 5 October 2018
- Medium: spray paint, acrylic paint, canvas, cardboard
- Dimensions: 101 cm (40 in) × 78 cm (31 in) × 18 cm (7.1 in)
- Preceded by: Civilian Drone Strike
- Followed by: Valentine's Banksy

Love Is in the Bin is a 2018 art intervention by Banksy at Sotheby's London. According to Sotheby's, it is "the first artwork in history to have been created live during an auction." His 2006 painting of Girl with Balloon unexpectedly self-destructed immediately after it was sold at auction. The damaged painting was later renamed Love Is in the Bin. It has been on permanent loan to the Staatsgalerie Stuttgart since March 2019. In October 2021, it sold at auction for £18,582,000 (then equivalent to US$25,327,452 or €21.62M), a record for the artist.

== Original work ==
The painting is an adaptation of Banksy's 2002 mural Girl with Balloon, rare as a unique work rather than a print. It was given by Banksy to a friend shortly after the "Barely Legal" exhibition in 2006. Banksy has said he prepared the self-destruct mechanism at this time in case the work was ever put up for auction.

== Auction and self-destruction ==
Sotheby's London sold the painting at auction on 5 October 2018, at an artist-record price of £1,042,000 (then equivalent to US$1,366,672 or €1.18M). Within seconds of the gavel drop, the canvas began sliding out of the bottom of the frame and shredding itself to the audible sound of a siren and the surprise exclamations of attendees. The shredder stopped when the canvas was about half-way through; Banksy has said this stop was unplanned and that he intended to shred it completely. The work was housed in a deep frame and was plugged in to facilitate built-in electrical lights, which also powered a shredding device hidden in the bottom edge. Sotheby's said it had no foreknowledge of the mechanism. Immediately after the sale, technicians from Banksy's representatives, Pest Control, deactivated the shredder, but the mechanics remained in the frame.

After the shredding, there was a negotiation with the buyer to confirm the sale, and on 11 October it was agreed that the sale would go through at the full original price. The work was renamed by Pest Control, from Girl with Balloon, to Love Is in the Bin. Market watchers speculated that the self-destruction would increase the artwork's value. Sotheby's released a statement that called it "the first artwork in history to have been created live during an auction".

It was reported that the artist uploaded a video of the event onto Instagram, showing the construction of the shredding mechanism and frame, but deleted the post. Banksy subsequently released another video indicating that the painting was intended to be shredded completely, showing the painting being shredded with the words: "In rehearsals it worked every time".

It was sold by auction at Sotheby's on 14 October 2021 for £18,582,000 (then equivalent to US$25,327,452 or €21.62M), a record for the artist, against a £4-6 million guide price (then equivalent to US$5.45-8.18M or €4.7–7M).

== Speculations ==
It has been speculated that a man seen filming the shredding was Banksy or someone connected to him.

Shortly after the auction Josh Gilbert, an artist specializing in metal sculpture and also a magician, noted what he thought were a number of inconsistencies with the work shredding itself and the purported video of its construction released by Banksy. In particular, the video showed cutting blades placed sideways which would be unable to cut the canvas. Additionally the blades were "nowhere near where the painting sits". He instead conjectured that the original painting is simply rolled toward a hidden compartment in the back, while a pre-shredded copy is rolled out the bottom of the frame.

== See also ==
- Auto-destructive art
- List of works by Banksy
