= Girl with Balloon =

Series of murals in London by Banksy

- Original mural on Waterloo Bridge in South Bank
- Artist: Banksy
- Year: 2002

Girl with Balloon (also, Balloon Girl or Girl and Balloon) is a series of stencil murals around London by the graffiti artist Banksy, started in 2002. They depict a young girl with her hand extended toward a red heart-shaped balloon carried away by the wind. The locations for this work include street murals in Shoreditch and the South bank in London on the Waterloo Bridge and other murals were around London, though none remain there.

Banksy has several times used variants of this design to support social campaigns: in 2005 about the West Bank barrier, in 2014 about the Syrian refugee crisis, and also about the 2017 UK election. A 2017 Samsung poll ranked Girl with Balloon as the United Kingdom's number one favourite artwork.

In 2018, a framed copy of the work was shredded after being sold at auction by way of a mechanical device Banksy had hidden inside the frame. Banksy confirmed that he was responsible for the shredding and gave the altered piece a new name, Love Is in the Bin. Sotheby's said it was "the first work in history ever created during a live auction."

== History ==
The locations for this work include Waterloo Bridge as well as other sites around London, though none still remain. A 2004 version of the mural was at an east London shop in Shoreditch, sold in 2007 for £37,200 (€54400) at Sotheby's, and was removed by the Sincura Group in 2014 and sold for £500,000 (€690000) on 19 September 2015.

Several sets of limited edition prints of the work were produced, which became valuable over time. An initial set of 25 signed prints was produced in 2003, while a set of 150 signed prints and a set of 600 unsigned prints were produced in 2004/2005. In addition to the signed and unsigned edition, a series of 88 artist proofs consisting of blue, pink, gold and purple hearts (22 of each colour) were also released. In November 2015, one of the signed set of 150 was auctioned for £56,250, more than twice its estimated value. The artwork motif was also released in 2005 as a series of hand-sprayed paintings comprising multiple versions including a signed diptych edition of 25 with each panel measuring 30 x 30cm.

In August 2005, Banksy included it as part of a series of murals on the West Bank barrier, a variation called Balloon Debate of the girl floating above the wall while holding onto a bunch of balloons.

A 2009 version was sprayed directly onto the cardboard backing of an Ikea frame.

In March 2014, the third anniversary of the Syria conflict, Banksy reworked the painting to depict a Syrian refugee and added the hashtag #WithSyria. On 13 March, the image was projected on the Eiffel Tower and Nelson's Column. An animated video was released, featuring animation based on Banksy's work, narration by Idris Elba, and music by Elbow. In the following weeks, the singer Justin Bieber got a tattoo based on the original art and posted a picture of it on Instagram before deleting it. Banksy posted this picture on his Facebook page with the comment "Controversial".

In July 2017, a Samsung poll of 2,000 people from the United Kingdom asked participants to rank twenty pieces of British art. The poll's results listed Balloon Girl as the people's number one favourite artwork.

A print of Balloon Girl – Colour AP (Purple) was sold in an auction in September 2020 for £791,250, making it the highest bidding price for a Banksy print and the most expensive print sold in an online auction.

=== United Kingdom general election controversy ===
In early June 2017 before the United Kingdom general election, Banksy introduced a variant of Girl with Balloon with the balloon coloured with the Union Jack design. Banksy initially offered to send a free print of his art to registered voters in certain constituencies who could offer photographic proof they had voted against the Tories. The offer included a disclaimer: "This print is a souvenir piece of campaign material, it is in no way meant to influence the choices of the electorate." Banksy cancelled this offer on 6 June 2017 after the Electoral Commission warned him it could violate election bribery laws and invalidate the election's results in those constituencies.

=== Shredding at auction ===
On 5 October 2018, a 2006 framed copy of the artwork was auctioned at Sotheby's London selling for £1,042,000 (€1.2M) – a record high for the artist. Moments after the closing bid, the artwork began to self-destruct by means of a hidden mechanical paper shredder that Banksy had built into the frame bottom. Only the lower half shredded. Banksy released an image of the shredding on Instagram with the words "Going, going gone..". Sotheby's said, "We have not experienced this situation in the past where a painting spontaneously shredded", leading some market watchers to speculate the remains of the painting will be worth even more. Banksy released a video of the shredding and how the shredder was installed into the frame in case the picture ever went up for auction.

The woman who won the bidding at the auction decided to go through with the purchase. The partially shredded work has been given a new title, Love Is in the Bin, and was authenticated by Banksy's authentication body Pest Control. Sotheby's released a statement that called it "the first artwork in history to have been created live during an auction." Love Is in the Bin was itself sold at Sotheby's for £18 million in October 2021.

=== 2024 theft ===
A print of Girl with Balloon, worth an estimated £270,000 (€303000), was stolen from the Grove Gallery in New Cavendish Street, London, in September 2024. Two men were charged with the theft and the artwork was later recovered.

== See also ==
- List of works by Banksy
- List of works by Banksy that have been damaged or destroyed
