= People's Republic of Stokes Croft =

- PRSC Logo
- Abbreviation: PRSC
- Formation: September 22, 2007; 18 years ago
- Type: Community organization
- Headquarters: 35 Jamaica Street, Stokes Croft, Bristol
- Location: Stokes Croft, Bristol
- Chairman: Chris Chalkley
- Website: www.prsc.org.uk

The People's Republic of Stokes Croft (PRSC) is a community organisation based in the Stokes Croft area of Bristol, England. It was launched 22 September 2007, by founding member Chris Chalkley.

Its main aim is to "provide benefit to The Community by promoting the interests of the area", which include creativity, culture and the local economy. The mission of the PRSC is to help Stokes Croft to recognise its special qualities, by improving the streetscape through direct action, and creating a sense of identity.

It has been successful in getting local people involved in how their area is developed, and encouraging and commissioning street art which has improved the appearance of formerly derelict buildings. The People's Republic of Stokes Croft rent studio space to local artists, filmmakers, and media creators. The organisation is "leading efforts to protect this unique area of Bristol from the creeping gentrification that's slowly making most of urban Britain look like a paved shopping centre forecourt."

== History ==
Chris Chalkley, a Bristol-based china seller, is named as one of the founders of the PRSC. Chalkley bought a plot of derelict land in 2006, on which he painted a mural. The mural was repeatedly painted over by the council, which encourages Chalkley to create a space for outdoor artwork.

The PRSC attributes its formal instigation to the creation of the Outdoor Gallery in 2007, an anti-consumerism art piece on a privately owned wall on Jamaica Street in Bristol. This kindled discourse around private ownership and art.

The organisation then painted boards in Stokes Croft, for which members were arrested. After going to court for the creation of a ‘Welcome to Stokes Croft’ sign, Bristol City Council ceased arrests of the group. The group then created the Yard, a workshop and project space. In 2010, Chalkley painted a sign on the front of an apartment block, reading “Welcome to Stokes Croft, Cultural Quarter, Conservation area, Outdoor Gallery”, for which he was ordered to pay damages.

In 2011, a poster commemorating the recent riots in the area was created by local artist Banksy, with some of the proceeds of its sale going towards the PRSC.

During the 2020 COVID-19 lockdowns, the group continued its support of local homeless people by providing survival resources, as well as "one of the city’s only 24 hour public hand washing points".

In 2022, the headquarters was made a community-owned asset, after a fundraising campaign to purchase the site from the city council.

== Aims and activism ==
The PRSC is partially funded by Stokes Croft China, 35 Jamaica Street. This shop sells bespoke English fine bone china, which is decorated in Stokes Croft with salvaged ceramic transfers combined with the art and politics of Stokes Croft. The china is produced by local artists on a voluntary basis. Stokes Croft China's customers have included Stanley Donwood, Bristol City Museum and Victoria and Albert Museum

Homelessness support is a tenet of PRSC's activism, and they regularly provide resources and events for local homeless people.

The PRSC School of Activism was set up in 2019, with the goal of providing accessible, socially-transformative education in Bristol. The school's tagline is 'Learning By Doing' and provides activities for young people aged 14–18.

In 2022, the PRSC partnered with The Loop and the Bristol Drugs Project to bring Home Office-approved drug testing services to the city.
