= UK City of Culture 2025 bids =

The bidding process for UK City of Culture 2025 was the process to award the designation UK City of Culture to a city or area in the United Kingdom, in which the winner hosts cultural festivities through culture-led regeneration throughout 2025. The title is awarded by the UK Government's Department for Digital, Culture, Media and Sport (DCMS). The 2025 City of Culture is the fourth city to hold the title since the programme began in 2013, following those of Derry~Londonderry (Note: Branded using this name for the city to avoid the naming dispute.), Hull, and Coventry. The competition for the 2025 holder was launched on 29 May 2021, with the deadline to submit bids being 19 July 2021. On 18 March 2022, Bradford, County Durham, Southampton and Wrexham County Borough were the last four shortlisted bids in the competition. On 31 May 2022, Bradford was announced as the winning bid, with the three runners-up receiving £125,000, the first time the runners-up receive a prize.

== Bidding process ==
By the deadline at the end of July 2021, it was reported that a record number of cities and areas had submitted bids to hold the title of UK City of Culture 2025, with the total reaching twenty, a quarter of which are from Wales. The then Secretary of State for Digital, Culture, Media and Sport, Oliver Dowden MP, stated that the sheer number of applicants for the title was a "testament to the huge success of City of Culture". The 2025 bidding competition has allowed for the first time, bids from regions, areas and places, including groups of towns across one or multiple local authorities, and even across the borders of the constituent countries. Those long-listed have been awarded £40,000 to support their bid progressing to the next stage of the competition. The holder was set to be announced in December 2021, but was postponed due to the number of applicants, with a longlist released on 8 October 2021, a final shortlist of bidders was released on 18 March 2022, and the 2025 holder was announced by the Secretary of State for Digital, Culture, Media and Sport, Nadine Dorries on 31 May 2022. The competition was judged by Sir Phil Redmond, chair of the expert advisory panel for the UK City of Culture 2025 competition, who led visits to each bidder prior to the final announcement.

Locations of UK City of Culture 2025 submitted bids. Green designates the winning bid and red for failed bids.

=== Winning bid ===
- Bradford – Bradford announced its bid for City of Culture in July 2019. Winning the designation would "be of benefit for every corner of the district" according to the leader of Bradford Council, Susan Hinchcliffe. The chair of the bid committee, Shanaz Gulzar, said that Bradford would have an opportunity to "collaborate locally, nationally and internationally" to generate more support for the arts if its bid was successful. It won the contest on 31 May 2022.

=== Other shortlisted bids ===
On 18 March 2022, four bids of the eight which remained on the October 2021 longlist, was announced. No bids from Scotland and Northern Ireland made onto the shortlist. The four bids, three from England, and one from Wales are as follows:

==== England ====
- County Durham District – Durham County Council launched its bid for the title on 19 July 2021, on behalf of Culture Durham, a local partnership of cultural organisations such as Beamish Museum, Durham Cathedral, Durham University and National Railway Museum Shildon (Locomotion).
- Southampton – Southampton City Council first announced it would bid for City of Culture in 2018. The bid was officially launched in October 2020, with Claire Whitaker as its director. Solent University and the University of Southampton endorsed the bid in a joint statement in December 2020. In March 2021, the council unanimously approved the funding plan for a successful bid.

==== Wales ====
- Wrexham County Borough – Wrexham County Borough Council announced their bid for the UK City of Culture title on 7 July 2021, in conjunction with Wrexham town's separate bid for city status. Council leader Mark Pritchard stated that "Wrexham has a bounty of mineral wealth and proud industrial past but is best known for its coal mining, with Bersham, Hafod and Gresford being our most well-known collieries." It is hoped that the recent takeover of the local football club can assist the bid.

=== Failed longlisted bids ===
The Department for Digital, Culture, Media and Sport, released the list all of bidders who applied to bid for the title on 20 August 2021, totaling to 20 cities and areas. The longlist of bids was released on 8 October 2021, totaling to 8 cities and areas.

==== England ====
- Cornwall – Cornwall announced its bid in June 2021, coming after the hosting of the G7 in Carbis Bay and a change in administration on Cornwall Council due to the 2021 local elections. The bid was led by the Cornwall and Isles of Scilly Local Enterprise Partnership and had the support of the Tate and its director Maria Balshaw, the Eden Project, the Newlyn Art Gallery and Falmouth University and its chancellor, Dawn French.
- Derby – Derby City Council announced its bid for the title on 6 July 2021, and stated that Derby had a strong standing for the title as "the birthplace of the Industrial Revolution, site of the world's first factory and industry home to Rolls-Royce, Bombardier (now Alstom), Toyota and many others" to fuel its bid.

==== Northern Ireland ====
- Armagh City, Banbridge and Craigavon – Armagh City, Banbridge and Craigavon Borough Council announced their intention to submit an expression of interest for the title on 29 June 2021. This follows a full council meeting the previous day, where councillors agreed that the bid will be centred on the City of Armagh, but will additionally showcase heritage, culture, and creative industries from across the borough.

==== Scotland ====
- Stirling – Stirling Council submitted their expression of interest for the title. On 25 August, the Stirling partnership was formed to assist the city's bid for UK City of Culture. The partnership includes arts, education, heritage and cultural organisations, such as Artlink Central, Big Noise Stirling, Creative Stirling, HES The Engine Shed, Forth Valley College Creative Industries, Macrobert Arts Centre, Stirling Smith Art Gallery and Museum, the University of Stirling, and Stirling Council.

=== Unsuccessful bids ===
==== Cross-border ====
- England–Scotland Borderlands – Dumfries and Galloway Council, Scottish Borders Council, Carlisle City Council, Cumbria County Council, and Northumberland County Council, together as the Borderlands partnership, announced they would launch a bid on 20 July 2021.

==== England ====
- Great Yarmouth and East Suffolk – Great Yarmouth and East Suffolk launched their joint bid in July 2021. Steve Gallant, leader of East Suffolk Council said "this is an incredibly exciting opportunity for East Suffolk and Great Yarmouth and will reflect our continuing hard work to ensure the highest quality of life possible." Similarly, Carl Smith, leader of Great Yarmouth Borough Council stated "our borough and the district of East Suffolk share a very special sense of place and a local distinctiveness which sets us apart as truly unique." In August 2021, street artist Banksy produced work entitled "A Great British Spraycation" across many sites in the region including Great Yarmouth, Gorleston-on-Sea & Lowestoft. Both councils were "delighted" with the work and believed it to be an endorsement of the bid.
- Medway – Medway launched its bid in July 2019, with Medway Council leader Alan Jarrett calling it "an opportunity to actually increase the recognition of the area". The bid also had the support of the Labour opposition on the council.
- Lancashire – Lancashire announced it would put forward a bid in November 2019, promising the "most ambitious and inclusive cultural plans ever proposed in response to the UK City of Culture competition". Lancashire County Council pledged £620,000 towards the bid in July 2020, with Michael Green, the cabinet member for economic development, saying that the City of Culture "could form a key part of Lancashire's bounce-back" from the COVID-19 pandemic. Lancashire County Council withdrew support in June 2021 due to concerns that underwriting it by £22 million would be a "financial risk". There were calls on the county council to revive the bid, and on 19 July 2021, it was announced that Lancashire would be reviving its bid to become UK City of Culture 2025 but without the backing of the county council. It would be supported instead from some town councils, notably Blackpool, Preston, and Blackburn with Darwen, and the Lancashire Enterprise Partnership. The county council had stood by its decision to withdraw its support for the bid.
- Torbay and Exeter – Exeter City Council and Torbay Council announced their joint bid on 20 July 2021. The two Devon councils aimed to showcase their UNESCO recognised attractions, the English Riviera Geopark in Torbay, and the Exeter Book at Exeter Cathedral Library. The councils stated the bid would have aimed to create a "cultural corridor between the places, while also providing the opportunity to for other towns between Exeter and Torbay to play a major role in a focused programme of events".
- Wakefield – Wakefield Council announced its bid on 23 June 2021, with an ambition to make the city a "cultural landmark" for the North of England. The cathedral city hosts three events: Wakefield's Rhubarb Festival, Castleford's Roman Festival and Pontefract's Liquorice Festival, and the district is home to attractions such as the Yorkshire Sculpture Park, The Hepworth Wakefield, the National Coal Mining Museum, Sandal and Pontefract Castles, and Production Park.
- Wolverhampton – City of Wolverhampton Council announced its bid for the title on 22 July 2021. The council stated that Wolverhampton's bid would be split into four themes. The Event City theme would have consisted of a partnership between private, public and third sectors, and local community groups to host local events to bring the culture of the city to life. The Music City theme aimed to showcase the city's music heritage, support local talent, artists, and the live music industry in the city. The Creative City theme would have been focused on creating a building to serve as a creative workspace and talent developing centre. The Digital City theme would have specialised in building the city's digital infrastructure, embracing technologies such as augmented reality and hologram technology, to deliver innovation to the city's cultural environment. Councillor Ian Brookfield, leader of City of Wolverhampton Council, stated that "Wolverhampton is a fantastic, culturally rich, diverse and dynamic city that’s going places. We have worked hard to create momentum on this to build on the very strong foundations we know we have." The bid was supported by the MP for South Staffordshire and then Secretary of State for Education Gavin Williamson, in addition to local arts groups. Although Mr Brookfield expressed concern that the judging panel may have been encouraged to award the title to city outside the West Midlands due to the 2021 holder Coventry also being in the region.

==== Scotland ====
- Dundee City, Perth and Kinross, Angus (roughly corresponding to the former region of Tayside), and Fife, collectively bidding as "Tay Cities" – Dundee City Council, Perth and Kinross Council, Angus Council and Fife Council submitted their collective expression of interest for the 2025 title as the "Tay Cities", a city region where the River Tay, Scotland's longest river, connects the four council areas. Some cultural attractions in the region include: V&A Dundee, Pitlochry Festival Theatre, Arbroath Abbey, and the University of St Andrews – the oldest in Scotland.

==== Wales ====
- Bangor and the north-west of Wales – Gwynedd Council, in partnership with Bangor City Council, Bangor University and local partners, launched their bid for the UK City of Culture on 28 July 2021. The bid encompassed the city of Bangor, the newly designated Slate Landscape of Northwest Wales World Heritage Site, and areas of Arfon and Anglesey.
- Conwy County Borough – Conwy County Borough Council submitted its expression of interest in the competition on 20 July 2021. The bid would have had its flagship town as Conwy, but the bid would have also extended to include various historical and contemporary assets across the county borough, including the town's 13th century town walls, Conwy Castle (part of the Castles and Town Walls of King Edward in Gwynedd World Heritage Site), the Great Orme goats of Llandudno, and Gwyrch Castle near Abergele. Wales rugby head coach Wayne Pivac had announced his support for Conwy's bid.
- Newport – Newport City Council submitted their bid on 20 July 2021, and stated that in the event of a successful bid, that the benefits of holding the title would be spread out across the city and wider Gwent region.
- Powys – Powys County Council's bid covered the entire county of Powys, and was one of the larger bids in the competition.

=== Unsubmitted bids ===
- Cambridgeshire and Peterborough – The new Mayor of Cambridgeshire and Peterborough Nik Johnson proposed a bid from the combined authority in June 2021.
- Chelmsford – In October 2017, Chelmsford City Council announced its intention to bid for City of Culture within a decade and its interest in bidding for the 2025 designation.
- Plymouth – Nick Kelly, the new leader of Plymouth City Council after the 2021 local elections, suggested in June 2021 that the city may submit a bid for the 2025 City of Culture and that the council would "explore in detail" what benefits the city would gain from it.

=== Withdrawn bids ===
- Northampton – Northampton Borough Council expressed interest in bidding for City of Culture in April 2018, seeing it as part of its initiative to "brand Northampton as an exciting place to visit". On 11 June 2019, it deferred its bid to the 2029 title. In June 2019, the town's bid team chose to instead focus on winning the 2029 City of Culture, seeing it as more "pragmatic".
- Norwich – In November 2017, Darren Henley, the Chief Executive of Arts Council England suggested that Norwich was well placed to launch a City of Culture bid and that it should be "a very strong contender". Norwich City Council ruled out a bid in May 2021.
- Tees Valley – The Tees Valley Combined Authority (TVCA) first announced its bid for the 2025 City of Culture in July 2015. A plan allocating £1.8 million in funding for a bid was approved in March 2017. In January 2021, it was reported that a formal bid had been met with "a lot of apprehension" when plans were set before the TVCA scrutiny committee. In June 2021, the TVCA announced they had dropped their City of Culture bid after continued hesitation on plans for the bid process, especially over the cost (estimated to be between £20–25 million). Shane Moore, the TVCA cabinet member for culture and tourism, said that the region would instead seek to strengthen its cultural sector without making "any type of formal bid" for the City of Culture title.
- Luton – Luton announced it was preparing to make a "credible and attractive bid" for City of Culture in February 2017. In January 2020, Luton dropped their bid after poor attendance at events aimed at boosting the town's profile; a "town-wide creative skills project" was announced instead.
- Gloucester – Gloucester City Council announced their expression of interest on 7 July 2021, described as the "Gloucester for Gloucestershire" bid, it is being led by the city of Gloucester. On 22 July 2021, the bid was withdrawn.

=== Table ===
UK City of Culture 2025 bids
Area	Constituent Country	Submitted	Longlist	Shortlist	Winner
Bradford	England	Yes	Yes	Yes	Yes
County Durham	England	Yes	Yes	Yes	No
Southampton	England	Yes	Yes	Yes	No
Wrexham County Borough	Wales	Yes	Yes	Yes	No
Armagh City, Banbridge and Craigavon	Northern Ireland	Yes	Yes	No	No
Cornwall	England	Yes	Yes	No	No
Derby	England	Yes	Yes	No	No
Stirling	Scotland	Yes	Yes	No	No
The City of Bangor and Northwest Wales	Wales	Yes	No	No	No
The Borderlands region (Note: Dumfries and Galloway, Scottish Borders, City of Carlisle, Cumbria, and Northumberland were collectively bidding as the "Borderlands region", it was the first bid for UK City of Culture that crossed a border between the Countries of the United Kingdom)	England & Scotland	Yes	No	No	No
Conwy County Borough	Wales	Yes	No	No	No
Lancashire	England	Yes	No	No	No
Medway	England	Yes	No	No	No
City of Newport	Wales	Yes	No	No	No
Powys	Wales	Yes	No	No	No
The Tay Cities region (Note: Dundee City, Perth and Kinross, Angus (roughly corresponding to the former region of Tayside), and Fife, were collectively bidding as the "Tay Cities")	Scotland	Yes	No	No	No
Torbay and Exeter	England	Yes	No	No	No
Wakefield District	England	Yes	No	No	No
City of Wolverhampton	England	Yes	No	No	No
Great Yarmouth & East Suffolk	England	Yes	No	No	No
