= Bradford UK City of Culture 2025 =

Cultural designation awarded to Bradford

Bradford 2025 UK City of Culture
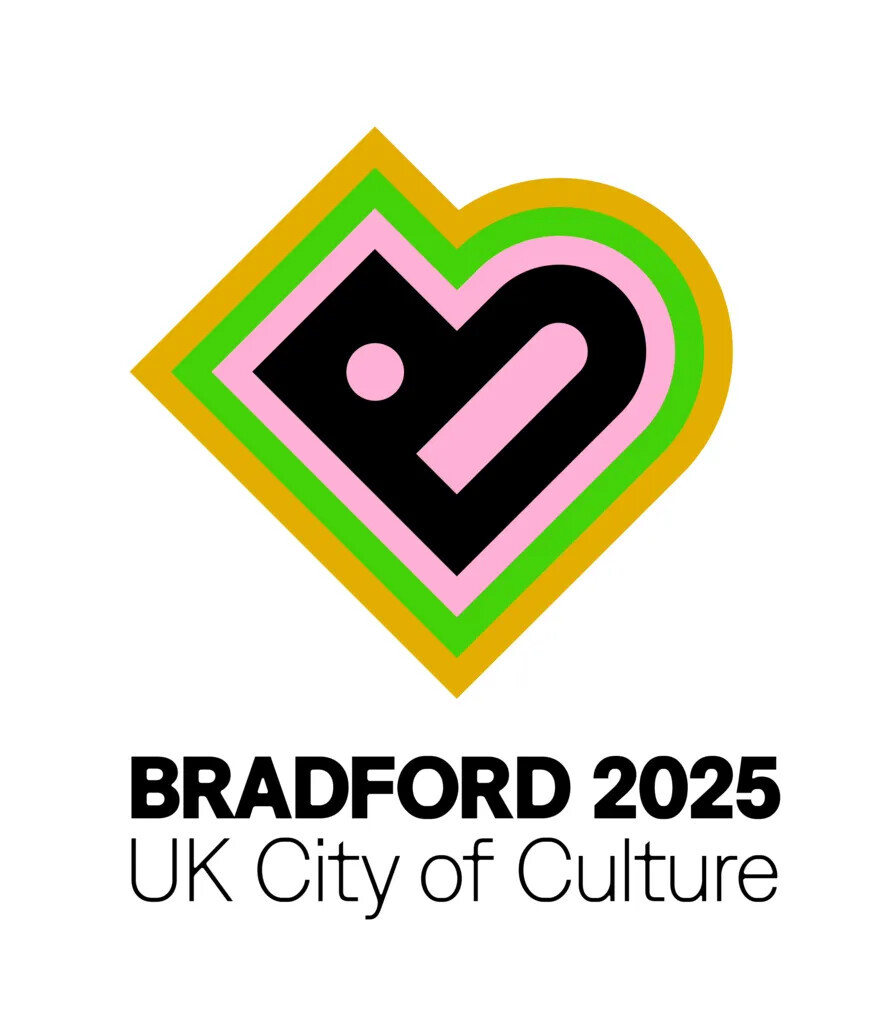
- Logo of Bradford 2025
- Date: 1 January – 31 December 2025 (Note: The programme can start anytime in 2025 and will last 12 months, and can extend into 2026, i.e. starts in May 2025, ends in May 2026.)
- Location: Bradford, West Yorkshire
- Type: UK City of Culture
- Theme: Cultural
- Organised by: Department for Digital, Culture, Media and Sport
- Predecessor: Coventry UK City of Culture 2021

Bradford 2025 UK City of Culture was the designation given to Bradford, England, between 2025 and 2026 by the Department for Digital, Culture, Media and Sport (DCMS). The designation meant that Bradford gained access to funding to improve infrastructure and arts facilities, and hosted a series of events celebrating local culture through 2025. Bradford won the designation on 31 May 2022, winning over bids from County Durham, Southampton and Wrexham County Borough to become the fourth UK City of Culture since the programme began in 2013, following Derry~Londonderry (Note: Branded using this name for the city to avoid the naming dispute.), Hull, and Coventry, as well as the second in Yorkshire. The 2025 bidding contest was launched on 29 May 2021, and was the first contest since 2013 open to local areas in the United Kingdom, receiving twenty bids by July 2021.

== Background ==
UK City of Culture is a designation given to a different city every four years by the DCMS with the aim of using the arts to celebrate and regenerate forgotten areas.

== Bidding and selection process ==
By the deadline at the end of July 2021, it was reported that a record number of twenty cities and areas had submitted bids to hold the title of UK City of Culture 2025, a quarter of which were from Wales. The then Secretary of State for Digital, Culture, Media and Sport, Oliver Dowden MP, stated that the sheer number of applicants for the title was a "testament to the huge success of City of Culture". For the first time, the 2025 bidding competition allowed bids from regions and areas, including groups of towns across one or multiple local authorities, and even across the borders of the constituent countries. Those long-listed were awarded £40,000 to support their bid progressing to the next stage of the competition. The holder was set to be announced in December 2021, but was postponed due to the number of applicants, with a longlist released on 8 October 2021, a final shortlist of bidders was released on 18 March 2022. Bradford was announced as the 2025 holder by Secretary of State for Digital, Culture, Media and Sport, Nadine Dorries on 31 May 2022, winning over the other shortlisted bids from County Durham, Southampton and Wrexham County Borough which all received £125,000 as runners-up. The competition was judged by Sir Phil Redmond, chair of the expert advisory panel for the UK City of Culture 2025 competition, who led visits to each bidder prior to the final announcement.

== Programme ==
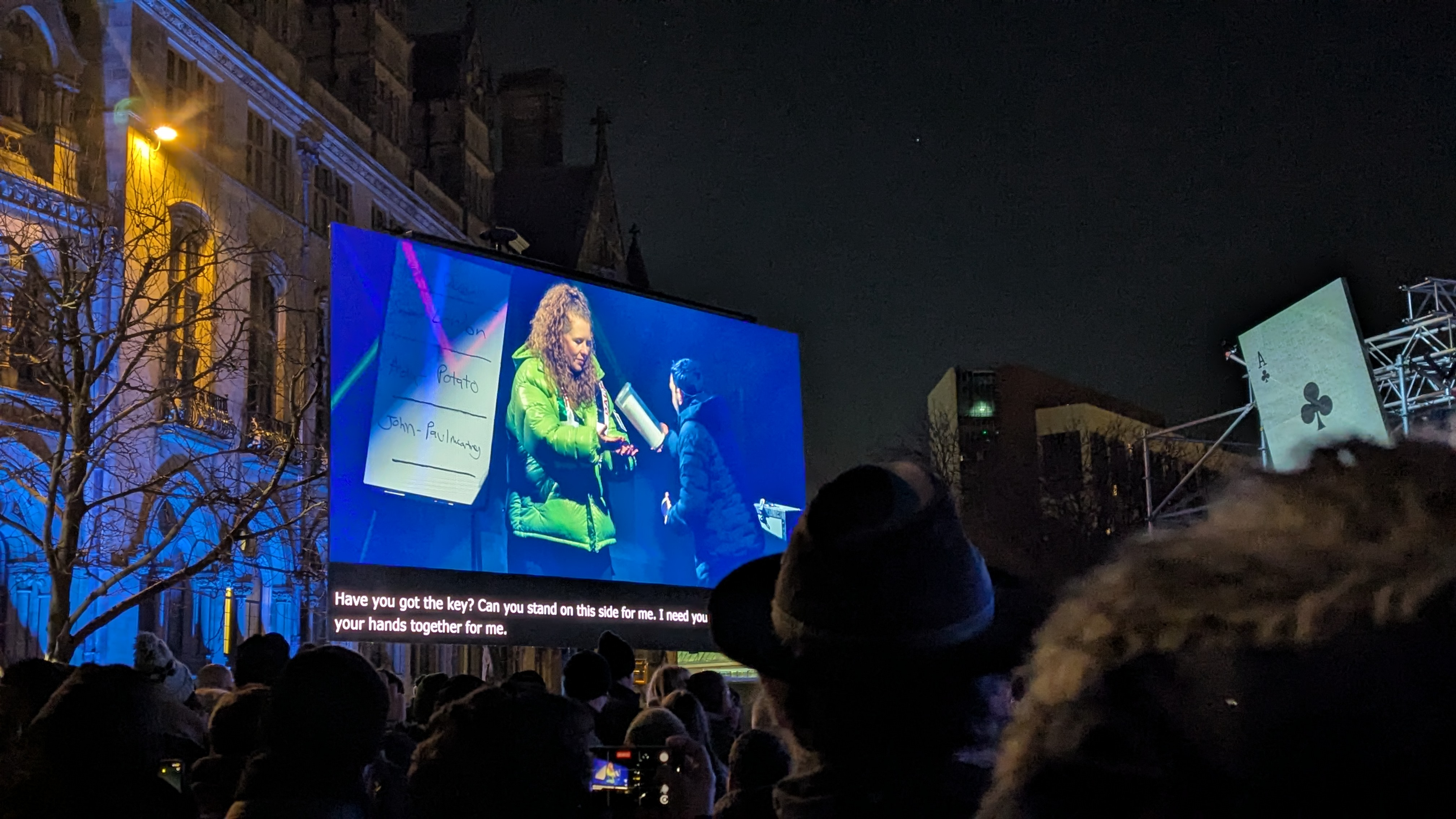
Bradford 2025 – Kirsty Taylor and Steven Frayne

The opening ceremony took place on 10 January 2025 with an outdoor performance in freezing temperatures by magician Steven Frayne and poets, singers and dancers from Bradford.

The year-long programme also included: a season of performances celebrating the life of Andrea Dunbar; Asian Dub Foundation with a live-score of La Haine; Richard Hawley with the Black Dyke Band; The Bradford Progress, new collaborative pieces by Charles Hazlewood; newly commissioned dance performances by Akram Khan at the Bradford Alhambra, featuring inter-generational and inter-cultural performers from around the city.

The closing ceremony, called Brighter Still, took place on 20 and 21 December 2025.

Bradford’s designation as UK City of Culture expired on 31 March 2026, ahead of the handover to the next UK City of Culture in 2029.

== Impact ==
Full impact reports are due towards the end of 2026. Initial results have been positive, confirming three million people attended the over 5,000 Bradford 2025 events. Over 87,000 people in Bradford District took part in the year, and 8 out of 10 local residents said Bradford 2025 made them proud of where they live.

== See also ==
- Coventry UK City of Culture 2021 – the previous winner
- European Capital of Culture – the scheme that inspired UK City of Culture
