= Coventry UK City of Culture 2021 =

Cultural designation awarded to Coventry

- The logo of Coventry UK City of Culture 2021
- Date: 15 May 2021 – 1 January 2025
- Location: Coventry, United Kingdom
- Type: UK City of Culture
- Predecessor: Hull UK City of Culture 2017
- Successor: Bradford UK City of Culture 2025
- Website: coventry2021.co.uk

Coventry UK City of Culture 2021 was a designation given to the city of Coventry, England, between 2021 and 2025 by the Department for Digital, Culture, Media and Sport (DCMS). The designation means that Coventry gains access to funding to improve its infrastructure and arts facilities, and will host a series of events celebrating local culture. Coventry was selected in 2017 to become the third UK City of Culture since the initiative began in 2013.

== Background ==
UK City of Culture is a designation given to a different city every four years by the DCMS with the aim of using the arts to celebrate and regenerate forgotten areas.

Coventry has been a major manufacturing centre for centuries, producing dyes, leather products, cloth, ribbons and watches. More recently it was the birthplace of the mass-produced modern bicycle, then produced motor vehicles for decades. Because of the important role of its factories in the Second World War, Coventry was devastated by bombing raids which destroyed many buildings in the city centre. The city was rebuilt through the second half of the 20th century, but the decline of manufacturing in the UK hit Coventry hard; unemployment and poverty rose through the 1980s. Communities began to suffer as many people sought work elsewhere. The city is also home to Coventry City FC who compete in English football's second tier, the Championship, having competed in the top flight of English football for 34 years consecutively and the club also won the FA Cup in 1987. The club itself has a diverse and devoted fan base and undoubtedly has contributed to the local culture of Coventry. The club play at the 32,609-seater Coventry Building Society Arena in Longford, which also hosts music events and previously hosted 2012 Olympic football matches.

Coventry has produced some of the UK's best known musicians, including The Selecter, The Specials, Panjabi MC and Pa Salieu. It also has examples of buildings from many different periods of British architecture - from the timber framed houses on Spon Street to the Modernist Cathedral of St Michael. Several well-known writers were born or lived in Coventry including George Eliot, Angela Brazil, Debbie Isitt, Philip Larkin and Lee Child.

The city is home to a number of arts organisations, including Talking Birds and Theatre Absolute, who contributed to shaping the bid.

== Bidding and selection process ==
The competition to become UK City of Culture began in January 2017 with an announcement from Matt Hancock, then the Secretary of State for Digital and Culture. Bidding closed at the end of April and the shortlist was announced on 14 July 2017; Swansea, Paisley, Coventry, Stoke-on-Trent and Sunderland. Coventry beat the other four cities and towns on the shortlist and was declared the winning bid by Phil Redmond live on The One Show on 7 December 2017. David Burbidge is the Chairman of the Coventry City of Culture Trust and led the successful campaign to win the 2021 UK City of Culture title. In April 2018, Chenine Bhathena was appointed Creative Director for Coventry's year as UK City of Culture 2021.

== Delay ==
In July 2020, it was announced that the City of Culture events in Coventry would be delayed by five months due to the COVID-19 pandemic. The opening event Coventry Moves was planned to take place on 15 May 2021. However, though Coventry took the title on 15 May, the signature opening event was pushed back to 5 June.

== Resources ==
=== Coventry Atlas ===
Coventry Atlas, a local history and contemporary culture map, launched in 2021. As of April 2024, the map contains 5,676 records, 180 collections, nine walking trails and 40 historical map overlays.

The map is a collaboration between Coventry University, Culture Coventry and the Coventry City of Culture Trust. Coventry Atlas was developed as part of the Coventry Great Place Scheme funded by the Heritage Fund, Arts Council England and Historic England with partner funding from Coventry City Council, the University of Warwick, Coventry University, Coventry and Warwickshire Local Enterprise Partnership and Coventry’s Business Improvement District.

== Events ==
=== Coventry Moves ===
Coventry Moves was the opening event of the year, which saw "the city transformed, rising from adversity in a spectacular performance". It was co-directed by Justine Themen and Nigel Jamieson.

=== Terry Hall Presents Home Sessions ===
Terry Hall, lead singer of Coventry band The Specials will run a three-day music event in July 2021.

=== Turner Prize 2021 ===
The Turner Prize for visual arts is due to be hosted at the Herbert Art Gallery and Museum from 29 September 2021 to 12 January 2022. The four shortlisted artists will present a new work at the Herbert during the year.

=== Faith ===
Faith is a 24-hour-long piece of theatre that will take place in September, jointly produced by the Coventry City of Culture Trust and the Royal Shakespeare Company. It will consist of a story told through "music, theatre, installation and ritual" with opportunities for the audience to join in.

=== Coventrypedia ===
Information about people and places in Coventry was added to Wikipedia by volunteers organised by the Disruptive Media Learning Lab of Coventry University and its Wikimedian-in-Residence, Andy Mabbett. This took place at a series of online events in April and May 2021.

=== UnNatural History ===
An international exhibition at the Herbert Art Gallery and Museum exploring the role of the artist in response to natural history and climate change. This started at the opening of the festival and continued into August.

=== BBC coverage ===
The BBC's coverage of Coventry as UK City of Culture included special episodes of Antiques Roadshow and Hospital filmed in the city, and documentaries such as Classic British Cars: Made in Coventry and Delia Derbyshire: The Myths and the Legendary Tapes. BBC Local Radio station BBC CWR's The 21 initiative told stories of local people, and the BBC's Contains Strong Language spoken word festival will be hosted in the city. The UnNatural History exhibition was mentioned on the Woman's Hour programme on BBC Radio 4.

=== Finale ===
On 31 December 2024, Coventry’s tenure of the City of Culture came to an end and Bradford took over the mantle of UK City of Culture, which began on 1 January 2025.

== See also ==
- Hull UK City of Culture 2017 – the previous winner
- European Capital of Culture – the scheme that inspired UK City of Culture
