= Hevingham =

Village in Norfolk, England

Coordinates: 52.74382°N 1.26291°E

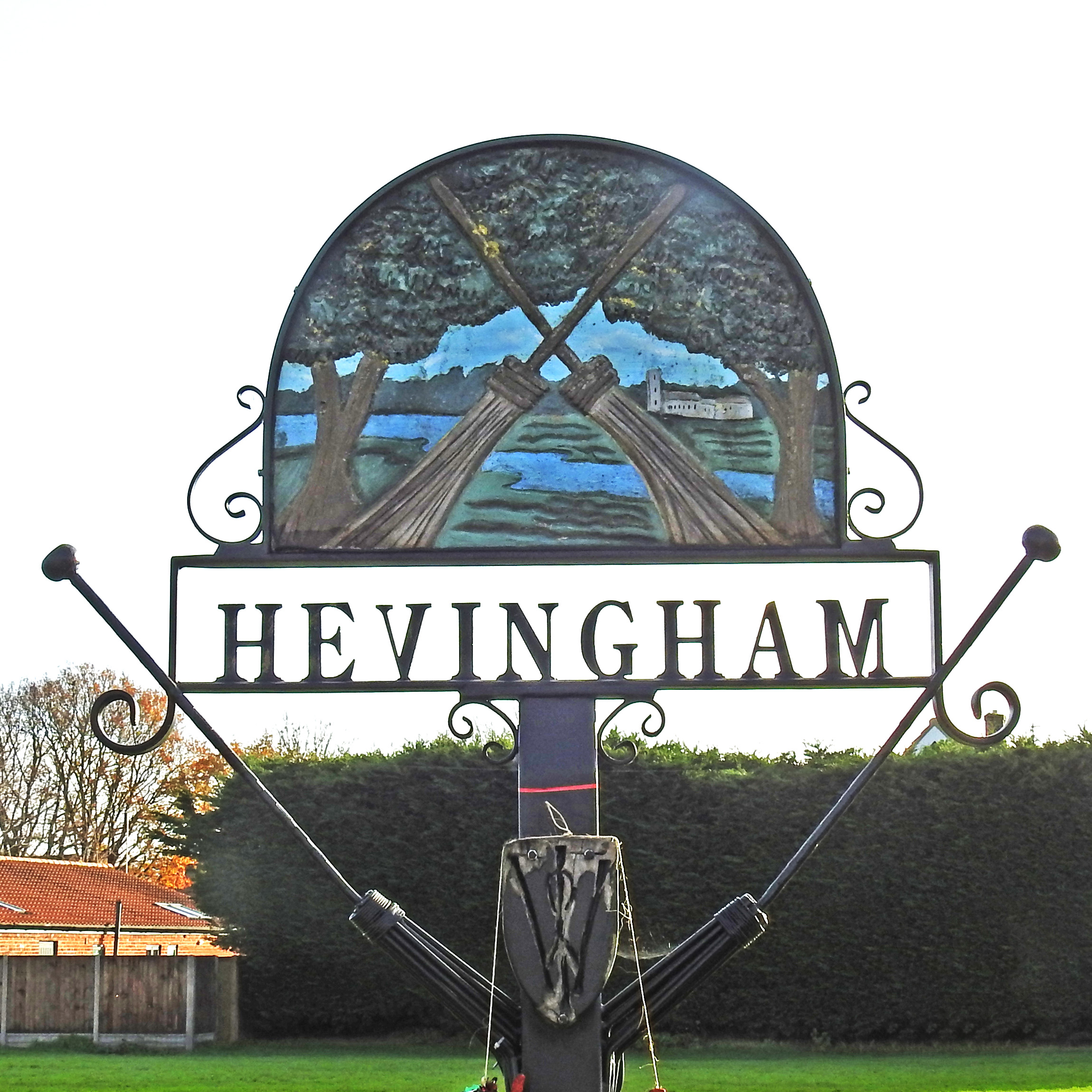
- Hevingham Village Sign

- Location within Norfolk
- Area: 4.50 sq mi (11.7 km^{2})
- Population: 1,309 (2021 census)
  - Density: 291/sq mi (112/km^{2})
- OS grid reference: TG203212
- Civil parish: Hevingham
- District: Broadland
- Shire county: Norfolk
- Region: East
- Country: England
- Sovereign state: United Kingdom
- Post town: NORWICH
- Postcode district: NR10
- Dialling code: 01603
- Police: Norfolk
- Fire: Norfolk
- Ambulance: East of England
- UK Parliament: Broadland and Fakenham

Hevingham is a village and civil parish in the Broadland district of the English county of Norfolk. The village is located between the A140 and the B1149.

Hevingham is located 4 miles (6.4 km) south of Aylsham and 7 miles (11 km) north of Norwich.

== History ==
The village name has Old English origins and is translated as homestead of the people of Hefa.

Archaeological evidence shows that the site of the village has been occupied since the Bronze Age. But there are much earlier signs of activity, a Mesolithic flint axe-head being the earliest archaeological find recorded, with several Neolithic flint axe-heads also being recovered.

There is evidence of Roman activity. A Roman iron-working site was found during ploughing and was subsequently excavated. Archaeologists also investigated pottery kilns in the parish in the 1950s. Five kilns were recorded. These produced cooking vessels and other pottery during the 2nd century. The names of two potters who worked at the site – INGENU and ESAMI are recorded on the stamps they used on their pottery. There are also extensive finds recorded from throughout the Saxon period.

In the Domesday Book, Hevingham is listed as a settlement of 50 households hundred of South Erpingham. In 1086, the village was part of the East Anglian estates of King William I, Walter Giffard and William de Beaufeu.

Another medieval settlement, named Rippon or Ripton, once stood in the parish but was likely abandoned due to the Black Death.

‘William White's History, Gazetteer, and Directory of Norfolk 1845’ described Hevingham thus:

HEVINGHAM is a considerable village and parish, three miles south of Aylsham, nine miles north-west of Norwich, having 893 inhabitants, and 2855 acres of land, belonging mostly to Robert Marsham, and William Repton, Esqrs., the former who was lord of the manor of Hevingham and Cats-cum-Cricketots, and the latter is lord of Hevingham-with-the-members-of-Marsham, which was anciently held by the Bishops of Norwich... The Church (St. Botolph,) has a nave, chancel, tower, south transept, and a handsome porch. It has inscriptions to the families of Hobart, Thetford, Deynes, Leigh, Scambler, and a curious sexagon font, with mutilated figures under florid Gothic arches"

With its redbrick 16th-century manor house, Park Farm is the former site of a moated bishops' palace. Built in 1250 by Walter de Suffield, Bishop of Norwich, it was used by subsequent bishops until the ownership of the land was passed to the Crown by Bishop Nix in 1531. Earthworks of the moat can still be seen and many artefacts have been found on the site by the current landowner. Adjacent Hevingham Park, a medieval wood may have been a deer park connected to the palace. There is also a massive bank and ditch marking the parish boundary.

There are records of a post-medieval windmill or smock mill which stood in the north-east part of the village, to the west of the Cromer road, and which was sold at auction 'to be dismantled' in 1869.

Other notable historic buildings include Pound Farm House, built in 1675 on The Street/Halls Corner, The Free School (Old School House) built by John Hall in 1726 on the Cromer Road, Avenue Farm House, built in 1835, and Hevingham Primary School, built in 1875 with a capacity of 100 students (currently 98 enrolled).

The site of a camping ground, or recreation field, where 'Camping' (a forerunner to modern-day Association football) was played may be recorded in the modern names of Camping Beck and Camping Bridge.

There is a complete World War II pillbox located in the south-western corner of Buxton Heath, itself a site of special scientific interest.

== Geography ==
According to the 2021 census, Hevingham has a population of 1,309 people which shows an increase from the 1,260 people recorded in the 2011 census.

The village is located between the A140, between Norwich and Cromer, and the B1149, between Norwich and Holt.

== Church of St. Mary and St. Botolph ==
Hevingham's parish church is jointly dedicated to Saint Mary and Saint Botolph and dates from the Fourteenth Century. St. Mary's & St. Botolph's is located on Cromer Road and has been Grade I listed since 1983. The church remains open for Sunday service fortnightly.

== The village sign ==
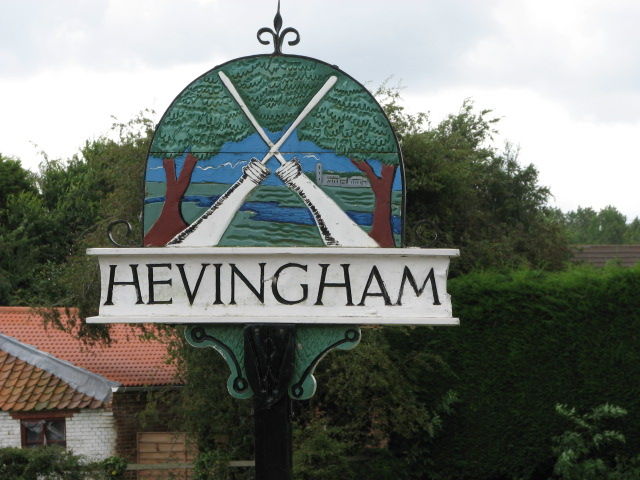
The village sign in 2007. It depicts crossed brooms, historically broom-making was a staple industry in Hevingham.

A sign of two crossed birch brooms which recalls a staple industry of the village in the past. The idea for the sign was conceived by a Mr. Wymer, one of the last of the brushmakers. The background imagery of the sign fits with the description given by Rev. Francis Blomfield when he wrote about the village in 1750, mentioning that "it lay at the confluence of several small streams". The sign is situated at the corner of the village green on Westgate (Formerly a pond called 'Westgate pit') and the current incarnation was erected in 2009.

== The village today ==
Amenities in the village include two public houses, The Fox and The Marsham Arms. On 11 July 2010 The Marsham Arms suffered a serious fire which resulted in its closure. After restoration the pub re-opened in May 2011, There is also a village hall where various events are held and which can be hired privately, the hall was built in 2000 to replace an older building and opened by Bernard Matthews. The main industries in the village are forestry and farming. Sanders Coaches provide regular bus services linking the village to several destinations including Holt and Norwich. Leisure facilities include fishing lakes Cobbleacre and Hevingham Lakes which also has a caravan and camping park.

== Notable residents ==
- Frederick Savage- (1828-1897) engineer and inventor, born in Hevingham
- Victoria Williamson- (b.1993) elite bobsledder and former track cyclist, born in Hevingham

== Governance ==
Hevingham is an electoral ward for local elections and is part of the district of Broadland.

The village's national constituency is Broadland and Fakenham which has been represented by the Conservative Party's Jerome Mayhew MP since 2019.

== War Memorial ==
Hevingham War Memorial is a stone cross on a three-stepped plinth inside the Churchyard of St. Mary & St. Botolph which was unveiled in 1920. The memorial lists the following names for the First World War:

Rank	Name	Unit	Date of death	Burial/Commemoration
Dvr.	John W. D. Allen	Royal Field Artillery att. 46th Div.	22 Apr. 1918	Lapugnoy Cemetery
Pte.	Frederick J. Bunting	2nd Bn., Norfolk Regiment	14 Apr. 1915	Basra War Cemetery
Pte.	Herbert J. Medler	2nd Bn., Norfolk Regt.	3 Jun. 1917	North Gate War Cemetery
Pte.	John H. Sutton	2nd Bn., Norfolk Regt.	14 Apr. 1915	Basra War Cemetery
Pte.	Richard B. Glendenning	3rd Bn., Northumberland Fusiliers	9 Apr. 1917	Roclincourt Valley Cem.
Pte.	Cecil A. Burton	4th Bn., Northumberland Fusiliers	15 Nov. 1916	Thiepval Memorial
Pte.	Albert Oliver	6th Bn., Queen's Royal Regiment	9 Apr. 1917	Sainte-Catherine Cem.
Pte.	Sidney G. Cole	15th Bn., Sherwood Foresters	1 Oct. 1918	Zantvoorde Cemetery

The following names were added after the Second World War:

Rank	Name	Unit	Date of death	Burial/Commemoration
Sgt.	Stanley G. Burton	No. 101 Squadron RAF	5 Dec. 1943	Hevingham Churchyard
Gnr.	Robert S. Williams	69 (Searchlight) Regt., Royal Artillery	5 Jun. 1942	Hevingham Churchyard
Tpr.	William Norton	Royal Armoured Corps	2 Nov. 1942	Alamein Memorial

== Photo gallery ==
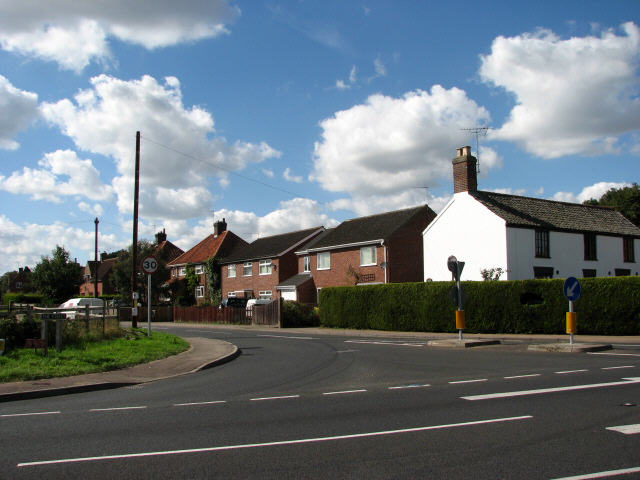
Cromer Road Junction

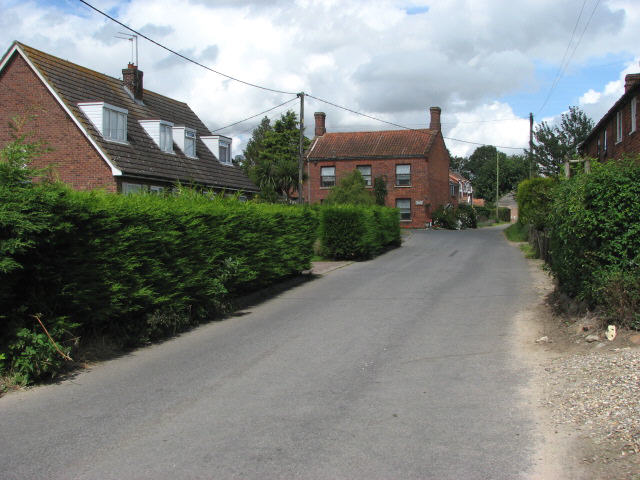
Halls Corner Lane

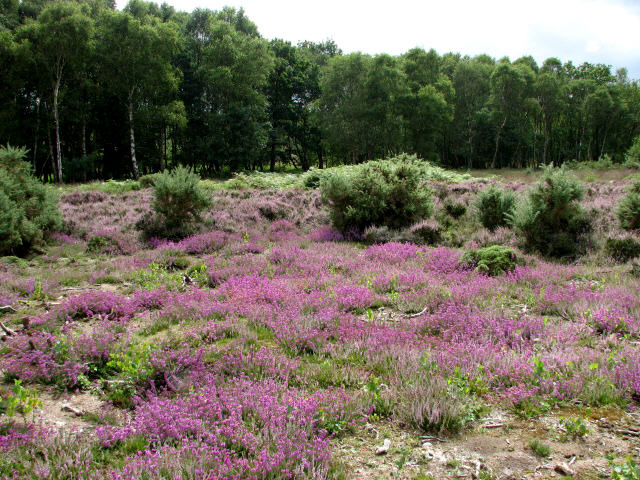
Buxton Heath Nature Reserve

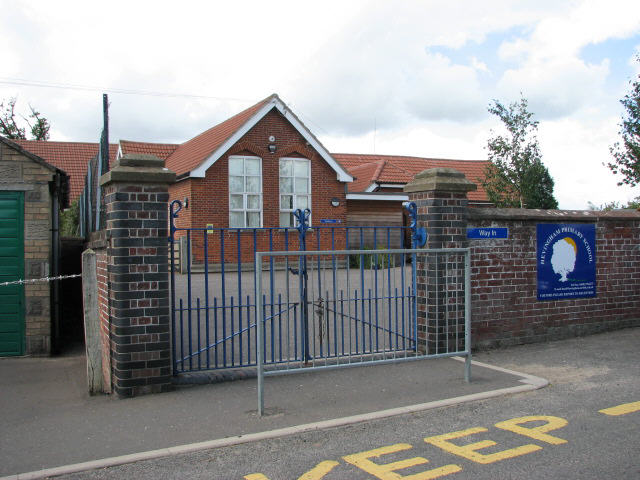
Hevingham Primary School

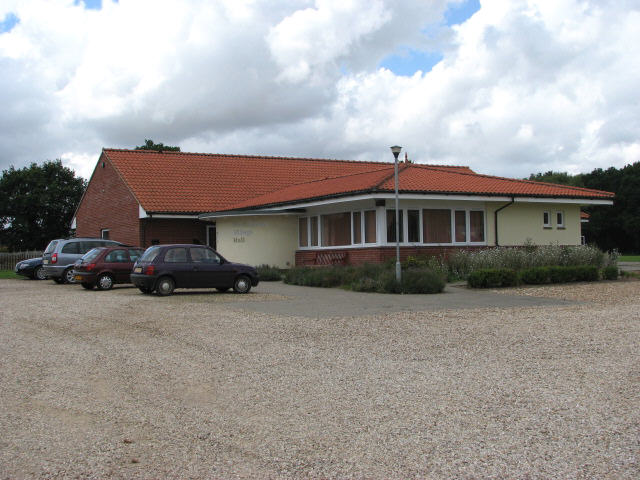
Hevingham Village Hall

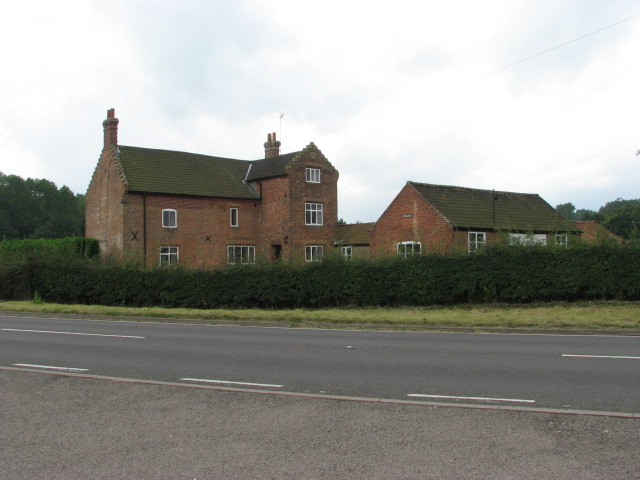
Park Farm House

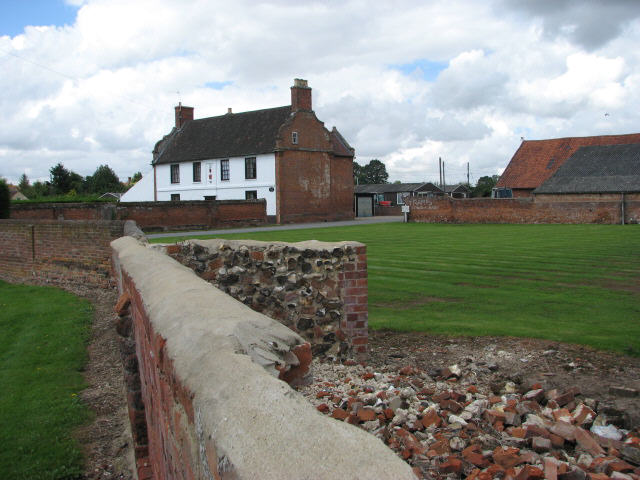
Pound Farm

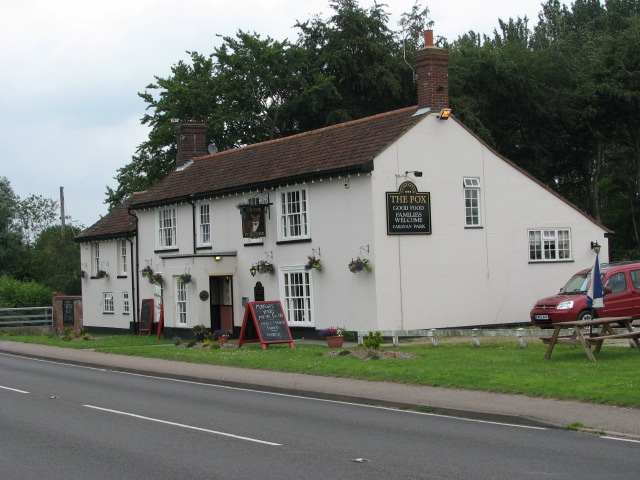
The Fox Public House
