= Pride in Hull =

Annual LGBT event in Hull, England

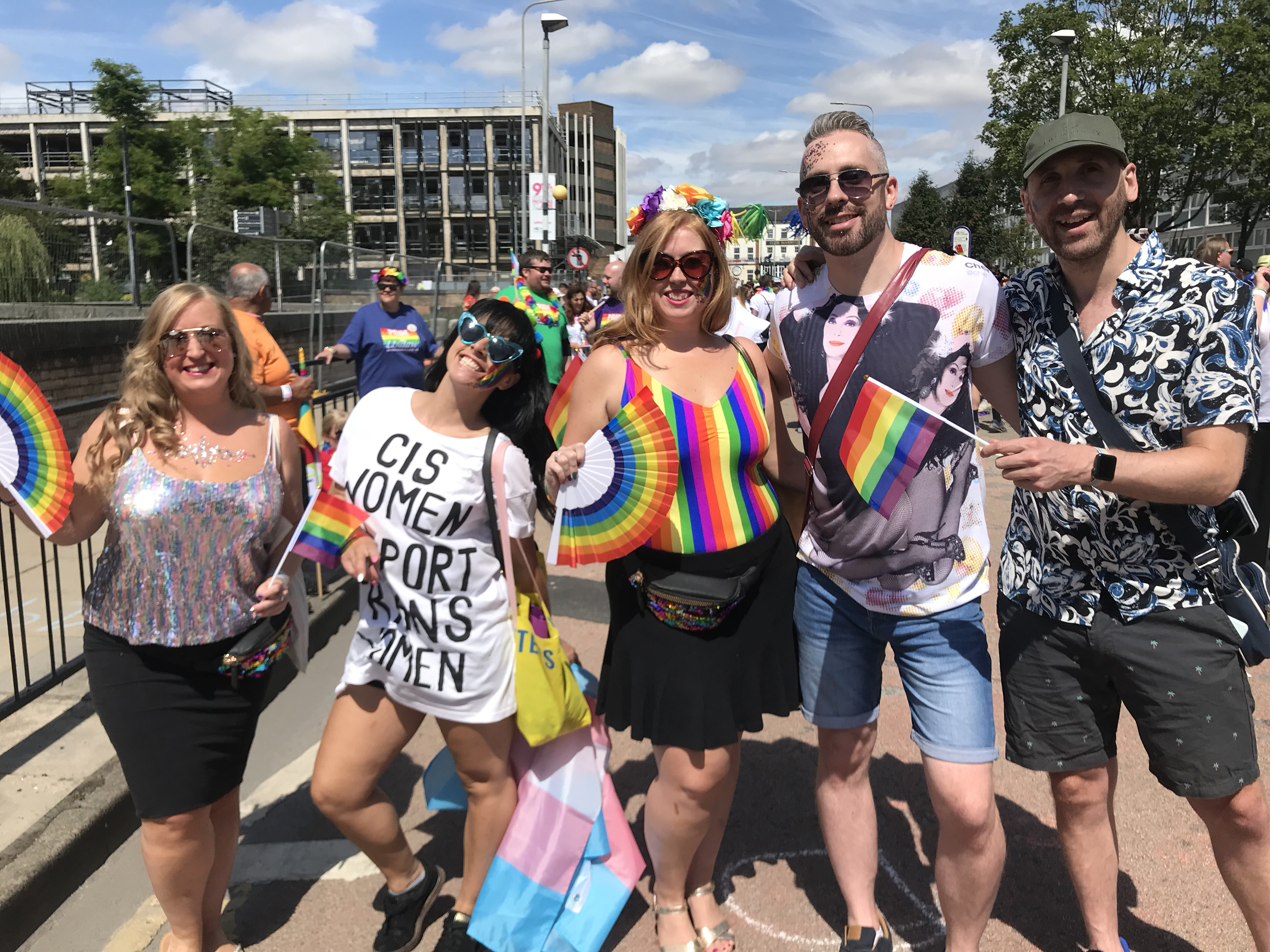
- Paraders at Pride in Hull 2018
- Begins: 12.00 pm
- Frequency: Annually
- Locations: Kingston upon Hull, England
- Founded: 2001; 25 years ago
- Most recent: 26 July 2025
- Next event: 25 July 2026
- Participants: 50,000 (2018), 67,000 (2019).
- Website: Official website

Pride in Hull is an annual LGBT Pride celebration held in the city of Kingston upon Hull, East Riding of Yorkshire, England. It takes the form of a parade followed by a large scale day-long music festival. Pride in Hull is organised by a board of volunteers, operating as the registered charity Hull LGBT+ Community Pride.

== History ==
Pride in Hull, known initially as Hull Pride, first took place in July 2001 in Queen's Gardens, Hull. The inaugural event was organised by The Warren women's group and attended by several hundred people.

By 2011, the event had moved to Hull's West Park, where it celebrated its 10th anniversary with a headline performance by The Vengaboys.

In 2015, Hull Pride was relaunched as Pride in Hull and took place on Baker Street in Hull City Centre, where it remained until 2016.

Pride in Hull was named the inaugural ‘UK Pride’ in 2017, a designation awarded to one Pride event in the UK each year. This coincided with Hull's status as UK City of Culture. The event returned to Queens Gardens, where it was first held over a decade earlier. It attracted 44,000 attendees and featured performances from Soft Cell frontman Marc Almond, B*Witched and RuPaul's Drag Race contestant Courtney Act.

The 2018 event attracted over 50,000 festival attendees and 2,000 registered paraders. Performers included Adore Delano, Nadine Coyle of Girls Aloud, Bright Light Bright Light and Ana Matronic.

Pride in Hull 2019 featured performances from Alaska Thunderfuck, the winner of RuPaul's Drag Race All Stars, Claire Richards of Steps and girl group Honeyz. Spice Girl Melanie C was scheduled to appear but cancelled on the morning of the event. Pride in Hull won the Visit Hull and East Yorkshire REYTA award for ‘Remarkable Tourism Event’ in 2020.

On 31 March 2020 organisers of Pride in Hull announced their bid to host EuroPride 2023, although this bid was later withdrawn.

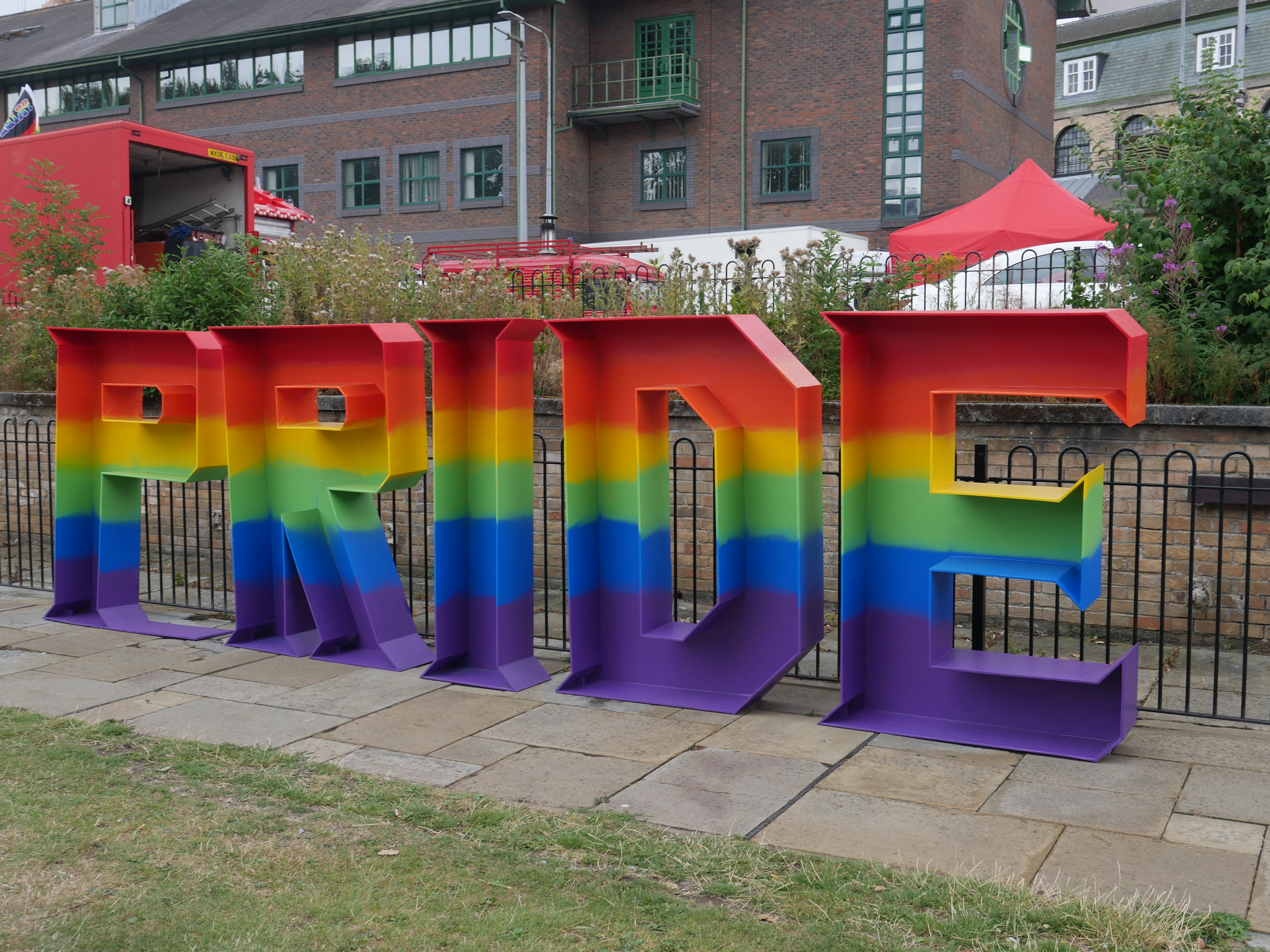
Pride in Hull installation

The 2020 and 2021 events were cancelled due to the COVID-19 pandemic and replaced with online events.

The 2024 event shined a spotlight on the trans community and featured Louise and DJ Stephanie Hirst.

== UK Pride and UK City of Culture 2017 ==
Pride in Hull 2017 was named as the inaugural 'UK Pride' - a nationwide initiative to highlight one LGBT Pride event taking place in the country each year. This coincided with the city being named Hull UK City of Culture 2017.

Pride in Hull formed part of a week of activity to mark 'LGBT 50', the 50th anniversary of the Sexual Offences Act 1967, which brought about the partial decriminalisation of homosexuality in the UK. Other events that included I Feel Love, a live concert broadcast on BBC Radio 2, the Yorkshire premier of God's Own Country and The House of King and Queens, a photography exhibition focussing on LGBT life in Hull's twin city of Freetown, Sierra Leone.

Audience research by Arts Council England and the University of Hull found that LGBT50 was highly rated, scoring particularly highly in the category 'it is important that it is happening here'.

== See also ==
- Hull UK City of Culture 2017
