= Freedom Festival, Hull =

Music and performance arts festival held annually in Kingston upon Hull, England

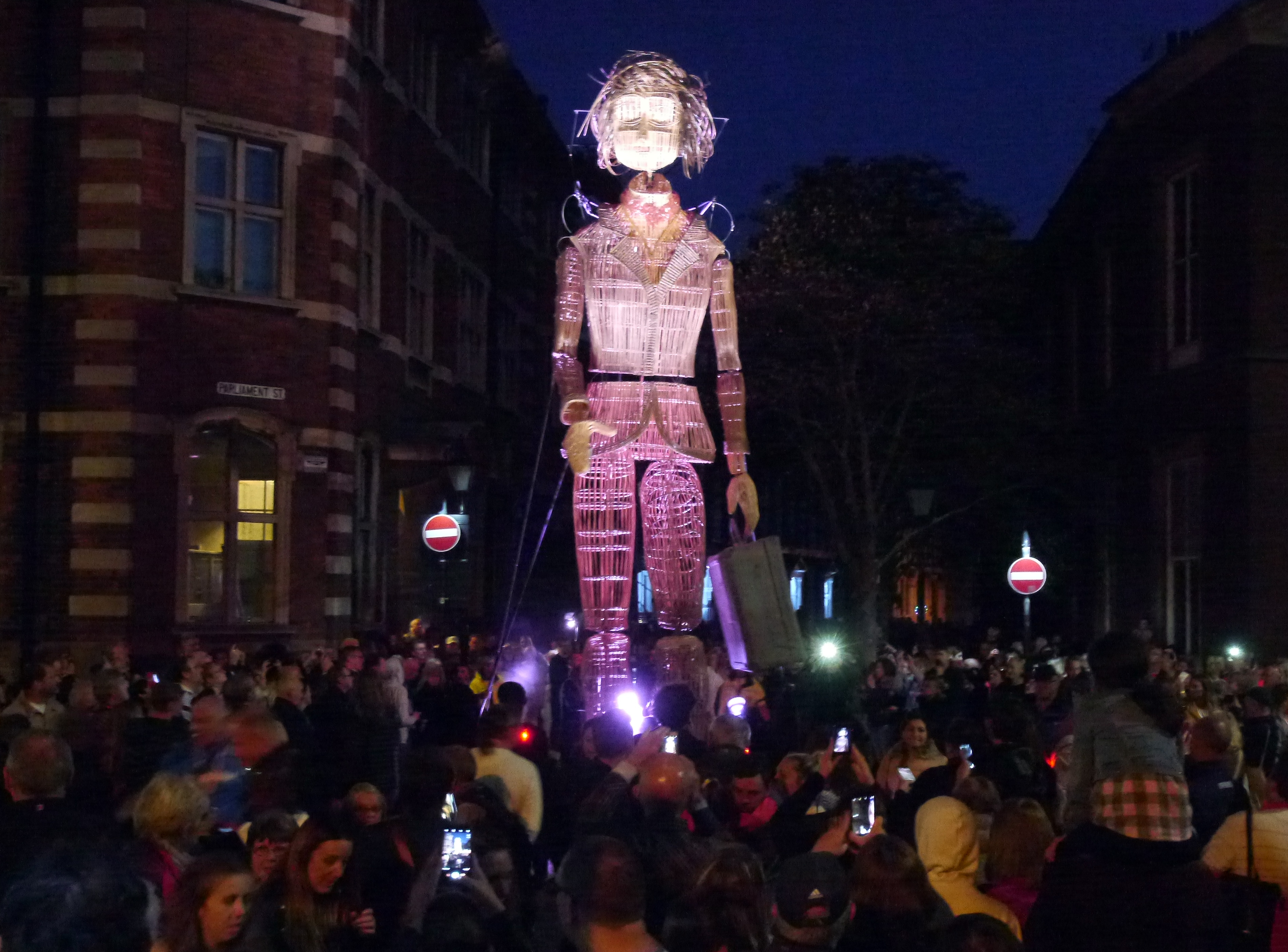
L'Homme Debout at the 2018 festival

The Freedom Festival is an annual music and performance arts festival held in the city of Kingston upon Hull, East Riding of Yorkshire, England. It is named in honour of the slave trade abolitionist, MP and son of Hull, William Wilberforce. The festival was established in 2007 to mark the 200th anniversary of Wilberforce's law, the Slave Trade Act 1807, to abolish the slave trade in the British Empire.

The entertainment at Freedom is varied and consists of music, dance, art, street theatre and various other entertainment forms from across Europe. During its history, it has welcomed acts such as Pixie Lott, JLS, The Saturdays, Martha Reeves and The Vandellas and The 1975, as well as many local bands and artists.

In 2013 the delivery of the festival was handed over to the Freedom Festival Arts Trust, a charity whose core activity is to "engage and educate the public in the arts" centred around the annual Freedom Festival

== 2008 ==
Originally held in the summer of 2008, the main festival stage was in Queen's Gardens in the city centre, along with smaller stages in Queen Victoria Square and Trinity Square (The Marketplace). The headlining act was The Magic Numbers.

== 2009 ==
The second staging of the event, in 2009, was a much expanded occasion, coinciding with the launch of the Clipper Round the World Yacht Race from the Hull Marina on the weekend of 11–13 September. Around 150,000 people attended various events around the city centre, including a spectacular fire display by French street art group Carabosse around the old fruit market warehouse district, and along the Humber waterfront.

Major pop acts, as well as local talent performed on several stages throughout the city centre, including Peter Andre, Florence and the Machine, JLS, Pixie Lott, Foals and Grooverider.

Queen's Gardens – Live music and activities on Saturday and Sunday plus the two fountain bars.

Humber Quays – Live pop acts on Saturday and the start of the Clipper 2009–10 Round the World Yacht Race on Sunday.

Jazz in the Boatshed – Hull's hugely popular Jazz festival featured as part of the Freedom Festival celebrations on the Saturday and Sunday.

Queen Victoria Square – A link-up with the BBC's Last Night of the Proms, live from the Royal Albert Hall on Saturday.

Fruit Market – Thursday, Friday and Saturday saw French company lit up the streets with fire installations, to the sounds of DJs and artists,

The Saturday night played host to a huge firework display, and as part of the Clipper Race boat departures, the Marina staged a Red Arrows flypast on the Sunday.

== 2010 ==
The third annual Freedom Festival took place on the weekend of 10–11 September 2010 with a spectacular centrepiece display by French art group Plasticiens Volants consisting of a parade of enormous inflatable Monsters. The artists indicated that the piece was inspired by installations of large fibreglass toads placed around the city in celebration of the Larkin25 commemorations for renowned late Hull poet Philip Larkin.

The full programme of events for the festival in 2010 included artists, comedians and performers of international standing alongside musical acts such as 2010 Mercury Prize nominees Foals, The Saturdays, Alesha Dixon, The Wanted, Fyfe Dangerfield, Diana Vickers, Starman, Roll Deep, Skepta and McFly Freedom Festival also showcased local bands and artists in the marina and Fruit Market districts.

== 2011 ==
The fourth annual free Freedom Festival was extended from three to a four-day event and took place on Thursday 1 September, Friday 2 September and the day and evening of Saturday 3 September.

This year the "big" pop stars of previous festivals like JLS and The Saturdays were dropped in favour of more local acts, to widen the festival's appeal and owing to a reduction of funding of one third compared to 2010. About 75,000 people attended music, dance and comedy events in 2011.

The line-up for 2011 included: King Charles, Fenech-Soler, Kyla La Grange, The Belle Collective, The Neat, Zagros Band, Ice House Project, Tribes, The Baghdaddies, White Pilots, Punjabi Akhara, Humba Rumba, Rory Motion, Sean Taylor, Jody McKenna, Roger Davies, Jess Graham Band, Camille O'Sullivan and The Hull Freedom Chorus. £100,000 in Arts Council funding helped to stage this year's festival.

== 2012 ==
The fifth Freedom Festival, Hull's showpiece cultural event, took place between Friday, 7 September, and Sunday, 9 September with what was described as "a spectacular mix of events". It boasted "a broad range of programmes including street theatre, cabaret, dance, comedy and live music". The headline act was Martha Reeves and the Vandellas.

== 2013 ==
The 2013 Freedom Festival took place between Friday 6 September and Sunday 8 September. According to reports over 80,000 people went to the three-day event, which this year was also in support of Hull's Bid to be named UK City of Culture 2017 against three other cities.

In June 2013, some of the details were revealed including that the event will open with a torchlight procession of over 600 local torchbearers moving throughout the city centre culminating in a rendition of Martin Luther King Jr.'s 1963 "I Have A Dream" speech. Up and coming Manchester band The 1975 headlined along with Akala, local comedy star Lucy Beaumont, comedy trio Pappy's and French pioneers of modern street theatre, Transe Express. As well as plenty of local music on the Fruit Trade Music stage, acts such as The Talks, Felony and The Happy Endings also performed.

Craig Charles recorded his BBC Radio 6 Soul and Funk Show from the event on the first night. Also Ziggy, an exhibition of never-seen-before Ziggy Stardust photographs and fan memorabilia from the 1970s, featuring Hull born Mick Ronson. It is also in support of Hull being a finalist in the UK City of Culture 2017 list.

== 2014 ==
The 2014 Freedom Festival took place between Friday 5 September and Sunday 7 September. The festival opened with 'The Long Walk to Freedom' Light Trail through Hull's Old Town featuring work by local artists inspired by Nelson Mandela and the street theatre performers Spark.

An estimated 115,000 people attended the Festival across its three days, with 57% from Hull, 31% from the East Riding and 12% outside of these areas

== 2015 ==
The 2015 Freedom Festival took place between Friday 4 September and Sunday 6 September. The theme for the festival was 'Broadcast' with the opening night featuring 'Voices of Freedom', a choral performance over the River Hull.

An estimated 114,200 people attended the festival.

== 2016 ==
The 2016 Freedom Festival took place between Friday 2 September and Sunday 4 September.

== 2017 ==
The 2017 Freedom Festival took place between Friday 1 September and Sunday 3 September and was part of the Hull UK City of Culture 2017 offering. Former United Nations Secretary-General Kofi Annan was awarded the Wilberforce Medallion at the festival.

== 2018 ==
The 2018 Freedom Festival took place between Friday 31 August and Sunday 2 September with around 130,000 people attending.

== 2019 ==
The 2019 Freedom Festival was extended to a 5-day event and took place between 28 August and 1 September.

== 2020 ==
The 2020 Freedom Festival planned to take place between Friday 2 September and Sunday 4 September, was cancelled because of the COVID-19 pandemic in May 2020. Instead a Freedom at Home online event replaced the outdoor event.

== 2021 ==
The 2021 festival was held from 20 August until 5 September 2021.

== 2022 ==
In 2022 the festival ran for ten days starting on Friday 26 August. The festival's spectacle event, "Mo and the Red Ribbon", featuring a promenade of large-scale puppets was performed by the French company L’Homme Debout on Friday 2 September.

== 2023 ==
The festival was held from 30 August to 3 September 2023, the line-up included Résiste, Tripotes La Compagnie and Zum-Zum Teatre.

== 2024 ==
The festival was held from 28 August to 1 September.
