= Themen =

Themen is a surname. Notable people with the surname include:

- Art Themen (born 1939), English jazz saxophonist
- Jurgen Themen (born 1985), Surinamese sprinter
- Justine Themen, theatre director
