= A Great British Spraycation =

2021 artworks by Banksy

A Great British Spraycation are a series of 2021 artworks by the anonymous British street artist Banksy in various East Anglian towns in England. Pieces appeared in Great Yarmouth, Oulton Broad, Lowestoft, Gorleston-on-Sea, Cromer, and King's Lynn.

The artworks were confirmed as authentic via an elaborate three minute video posted on Banksy's Instagram account and have further been revealed to be named en totale, A Great British Spraycation.

== Works ==
The series comprises the following works:

- Three children near a boat structure with the tagline "We're all in the same boat" in Nicholas Everitt Park, Oulton Broad, Suffolk. The boat structure was removed by Oulton Broad Parish Council to prevent potential flooding as it was blocking a drain and rain had been forecast; the council said the structure would be put back.
- A large mural of a seagull on the end of a terrace in Lowestoft, Suffolk, appearing to try and eat 'chips' (strips of insulation material) from a skip.
- A child with a crowbar next to a lifted paving slab and a sandcastle on London Road North, Lowestoft. The work was removed from its original location by the owner of the building in November 2021.
- A rat in a deckchair drinking a cocktail at the bottom of Links Hill, North Beach, Lowestoft. The cocktail glass was placed below a pipe that often drips with sewage waste.
- A couple dancing and a man playing the accordion on top of a bus stop on Admiralty Road, Great Yarmouth, Norfolk (pictured above).
- Graffiti on a miniature stable saying "Go big or go home" with Banksy's name and a rat at Merrivale Model Village, Great Yarmouth, Norfolk.
- An arcade claw machine above a bench on the seafront at Gorleston, Norfolk. It was subsequently altered by the addition of six teddy bears stencilled beneath the claw and the words "Banksy Collaboration Emo" alongside it, reportedly by a local artist. The work has since been defaced.
- Two children being flung into the air on an inflatable boat while the adult who pumps it up is drinking at Gorleston model yacht pond. This artwork was removed by Great Yarmouth Borough Council due to its proximity to the area where a child died after being thrown from an inflatable in 2018. The council said it hoped the work could be restored and placed elsewhere.
- A group of hermit crabs, one in a shell and holding a sign saying "Luxury rentals only" in Cromer, Norfolk.
- The alteration of a statue of Frederick Savage in Guanock Place, King's Lynn, Norfolk with a model ice cream and a tongue.

== Response ==
In a statement, Great Yarmouth Borough Council said that it "may be the case" that the art was in support of the area's 2025 City of Culture bid. Paul Gough said the works were "very sophisticated" and "show an artist at the top of his game". The art garnered some criticism, with the works being called "derivative" and "too tame and too cliched to make a difference".

== See also ==
- List of works by Banksy
