= UK Town of Culture =

Cultural designation in the United Kingdom

Logo used by UK Government

UK Town of Culture is a designation given to a town for one year, as a companion to the UK City of Culture scheme. All towns outside of Greater London without city status are eligible to apply. Three finalists are chosen, (Note: One town with a population under 20,000, one between 20,000 and 75,000, and one over 75,000.) the winner receives £3 million, the two runner ups receive £250,000, with the money going towards local culture.

It was founded by Lisa Nandy and launched on 30 October 2025. Applications for the first title closed on 31 March 2026. The first title will be awarded for the year 2028 and will be chosen by a panel led by Phil Redmond.

A shortlist had been due to be announced in Spring 2026 with shortlisted towns awarded £60,000 to work up their bids into a more detailed proposal. However, at the end of May, all towns that had submitted expressions of interest were emailed to say that: 'As a result of the exceptional response we have received, the expert advisory panel require additional time to assess all of the bids, and we will now announce the shortlisted towns by the end of July.'

The announcement was finally made on 9 July with 15 towns shortlisted out of 398 bids.

- Large towns: Basildon, Birkenhead, Grimsby, Rotherham
- Medium towns: Corby, Great Yarmouth, Leith, Pontypridd, Port Talbot
- Small towns: Ilfracombe, Isle of Bute, Lerwick, Sandown, Strabane, Stockton Town Centre Ward

There will be 3 finalists: one from each category of large, medium and small town.

Prior to the announcement, it had been thought between 100 and 200 towns had submitted an Expression of Interest by 31 March, although not all of these made their bids public. Research by the Daily Telegraph and other sources at the time revealed around 100 contenders for the title: more than 80 from England, 8 from Wales, 5 from Scotland and 1 from Northern Ireland.

England	Scotland	Wales	Northern Ireland
Large towns (greater than 75,000)
Bournemouth-Christchurch-Poole; Burton upon Trent; Crewe; Eastbourne; Grimsby; Halifax; Harrogate; Hastings; Huddersfield; Newcastle-under-Lyme; Northampton; Redditch; St Helens; Worthing	N/A	N/A	N/A
Medium towns (20-75,000 pop)
Accrington; Barnsley; Beeston; Bishop Auckland; Boston; Bridgwater; Bridlington; Bury St Edmunds; Chorley; Coalville; Congleton; Falmouth; Felixstowe; Great Yarmouth; Hinckley; Huntingdon; Keighley; Leigh-on-Sea; Lowestoft; Melton Mowbray; Newquay; North Shields; Penzance; Royal Leamington Spa; Scarborough; Shrewsbury; Skegness; Spalding; St Neots; Thetford; Warwick; Witham	Greenock	Port Talbot	N/A
Small towns (less than 20,000 pop)
Amesbury; Ashby-de-la-Zouch; Barnard Castle; Berwick-upon-Tweed; Bridgnorth; Broseley; Conisbrough; Guiseley; Helmsley; Helston; Henley-on-Thames; Ilkley; Kimberley; Kirkby Lonsdale; Knutsford; Ledbury; Leominster; Ludlow; Lymington and Pennington; Marazion; Mere; Oswestry; Pocklington; Redruth; Richmond; Rochford; Ross-on-Wye; Rye; Sandown, Isle of Wight; Settle; St Ives; Warminster; Watchet; Waveney Valley	Dunbar; Haddington; Penicuik; Stornoway	Abergavenny; Caerleon; Hay-on-Wye; Holyhead; Llandrindod Wells; Machynlleth; Presteigne	Strabane

The actually list of towns making a bid can be found in the DCMS announcement.
