= David Burbidge =

British orchestra chair

David Burbidge CBE DL
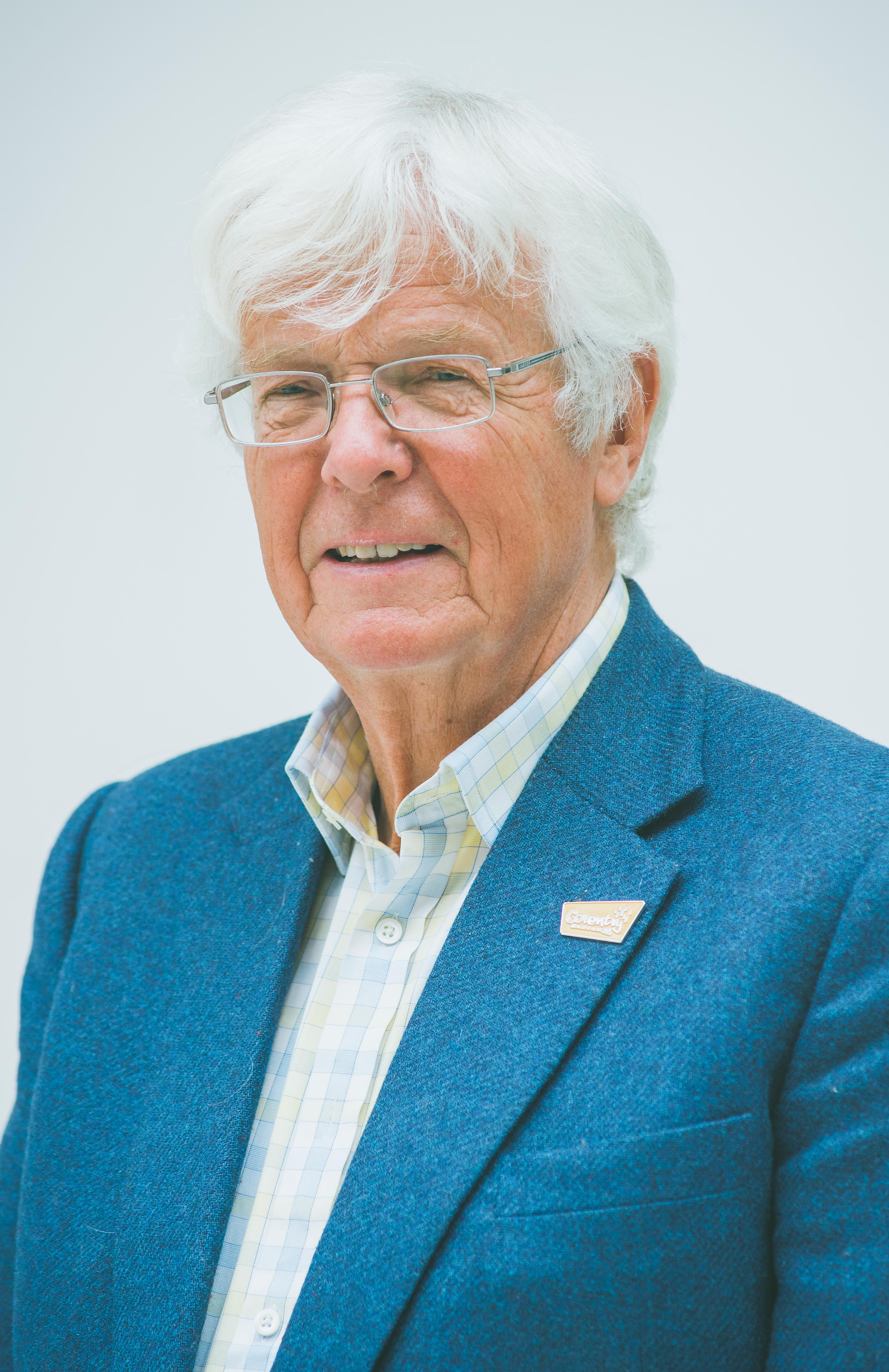
- Burbidge in 2017
- Born: David Lovell Burbidge; 15 October 1943 (age 83)
- Years active: 1963 – present
- Known for: was Chair of the City of Birmingham Symphony Orchestra(CBSO) up until 2023, Chairman of Burbidge & Son Ltd, Chairman of the Coventry City of Culture Trust having led the winning bid for Coventry the UK City of Culture title for 2021, former Chairman of the Belgrade Theatre, Coventry, former board member of the Royal Shakespeare Company and also a Deputy Lieutenant of the West Midlands.

David Lovell Burbidge, CBE, DL (born 15 October 1943) was Chairman of the City of Birmingham Symphony Orchestra (CBSO) & chaired the successful Sounds of the Future Campaign to raise £12.5m, former chairman of the Coventry City of Culture Trust having led the successful campaign to win the 2021 UK City of Culture title, Life President of Burbidge & Son Ltd and also a deputy lieutenant of the West Midlands, former board member of the Royal Shakespeare Company (RSC), founding chairman of Furniture Makers Hall and Freeman of the City of London (1979).

== Early life ==
Burbidge was born on 15 October 1943, and educated at Shrewsbury School and then Keble College, Oxford where he achieved a Master of Arts in Law. Now a businessman and philanthropist noted mainly for his work in arts and culture. His roles have included High Sheriff of the West Midlands County, Councillor on the Warwick District Council, Chairman of the Belgrade Theatre, Coventry and Chairman of the Central Campaign for the transformation project of the Royal Shakespeare theatres. He also enjoys gardening, painting, sailing and golf in his leisure time.

== Current roles ==
Burbidge was chair of the City of Birmingham Symphony Orchestra. Life President of Burbidge & Son Ltd, a Coventry manufacturer of bespoke high-quality kitchen and bathroom furniture. He is a Deputy Lieutenant of the West Midlands. Owner of Cedar House Gardens & Arboretum (www.cedarhousegardens.co.uk) and is a member of the National Garden Scheme charity. The Gardens were featured in Country Life magazine published 26^{th} August 2026 and the October 2026 issue of Homes and Gardens magazine.

His oil paintings were exhibited and sold at the Discerning Eye exhibition at the Mall Galleries in London in November 2026.

== Previous roles ==
Burbidge's previous roles have included former chairman of the Coventry City of Culture Trust between 2015 and 2022, having successfully secured victory for Coventry in the UK City of Culture title; non-executive chairman of Burbidge Capital Limited in Nairobi, Kenya between 2010 and 2016, also a main board member of the Royal Shakespeare Company (RSC) between 2008 and 2014 and Honorary Governor until 2024. He was chairman of the Central Campaign for the £112 million transformation project of the Royal Shakespeare Theatres at Stratford-upon-Avon which achieved successful completion in 2010. He was also a chairman of the RSC Pension Fund Trustees, plus a member of the RSC Audit and Investment Committees. He was a director of the Albany Piccadilly Trustee Companies. He was a governor and founding chairman of the development board of Compton Verney Art Gallery between 2009 and 2011, and a member of the development board of Garsington Opera for the move to Wormsley Estate, Stokenchurch from 2010 to 2012.

He was the Master of the Worshipful Company of Furniture Makers from 2004 to 2005 and was the founding chairman of Furniture Makers Hall between 2005 and 2012, He was instrumental in the acquisition and establishment of Furniture Makers Hall, where the Court Room is named after him. He was also chairman of the Belgrade Theatre, Coventry from 2001 to 2008, where he led a £14m campaign to build a new auditorium B2, new foyer and reception areas. The Burbidge room is named after him. His roles have also included being founding chairman of the Coventry Cathedral Development Trust, responsible for raising more than £5 million in funds for the Cathedral ministry and for endowment 1992 to 2005. He was director of the Coventry Building Society for two decades also chairman of the associated £50m pension fund between 1981 and 2005.

He was a councillor on the Warwick District Council, between 1972 and 1975 and President of the City of Coventry Scout County from 1996 to 2008. He became High Sheriff of the West Midlands County, in 1990/1991.

Under Burbidge's leadership in 1995/6, Burbidge & Son pioneered the introduction of Japanese World Class Manufacturing techniques into the furniture manufacturing sector. His company became an exemplar hosting visits for the West Midlands Manufacturing Challenge and nationally for UK First. He was a keynote speaker at conferences around the UK. He was also a guest lecturer for MSc courses in Manufacturing Strategy at the University of Warwick.

== Honours ==
Burbidge was appointed an Officer of the Order of the British Empire (OBE) in the 1998 Queen's Birthday Honours in recognition of his services to Coventry Cathedral. He was promoted to Commander of the Order of the British Empire (CBE) in the 2016 Queen's Birthday Honours in recognition of his services to cultural philanthropy in the West Midlands.

== Awards ==
Honorary Doctor of Letters (Hon DLitt) in recognition of significant contribution to arts & culture in the West Midlands, was awarded by the University of Warwick in July 2017.

Honorary Doctor of Laws (Hon LLD) in recognition of significant charitable and fundraising work by Coventry University – November 2015

Awarded The Coventry Award of Merit in 2015 which was established by Coventry City Council as a means to acknowledge and honour a model citizen for outstanding performance in a field which enhances the good name of the City of Coventry.

Arts & Business West Midlands Culture Champion 2012 in recognition of leadership for the regional fundraising campaign of the transformation of the Royal Shakespeare & Swan Theatres, Stratford-upon-Avon.

Coventry Evening Telegraph Special Honour awarded for outstanding contribution to business & industry – 2002.
