= Claire Whitaker =

British company director and trustee

Claire Whitaker CBE
- Born: Claire Lois Whitaker
- Occupation: Company director

Claire Lois Whitaker CBE is a director of several UK companies.

Whitaker was the Bid Director for the Southampton City of Culture for 2025. She was formerly Chair of the Royal Commonwealth Society and a Trustee of the Paul Hamlyn Foundation.

She was appointed Officer of the Order of the British Empire (OBE) in the 2015 Birthday Honours for services to jazz.

In July 2020, Whitaker was announced as one of the independent members of the Culture Recovery Board, which administered the Culture Recovery Fund as part of the UK response to the COVID-19 pandemic in England.

Whitaker was appointed Commander of the Order of the British Empire (CBE) in the 2023 New Year Honours for services to the arts and culture.
