= Frederick Savage (engineer) =

English engineer and inventor

Frederick Savage JP
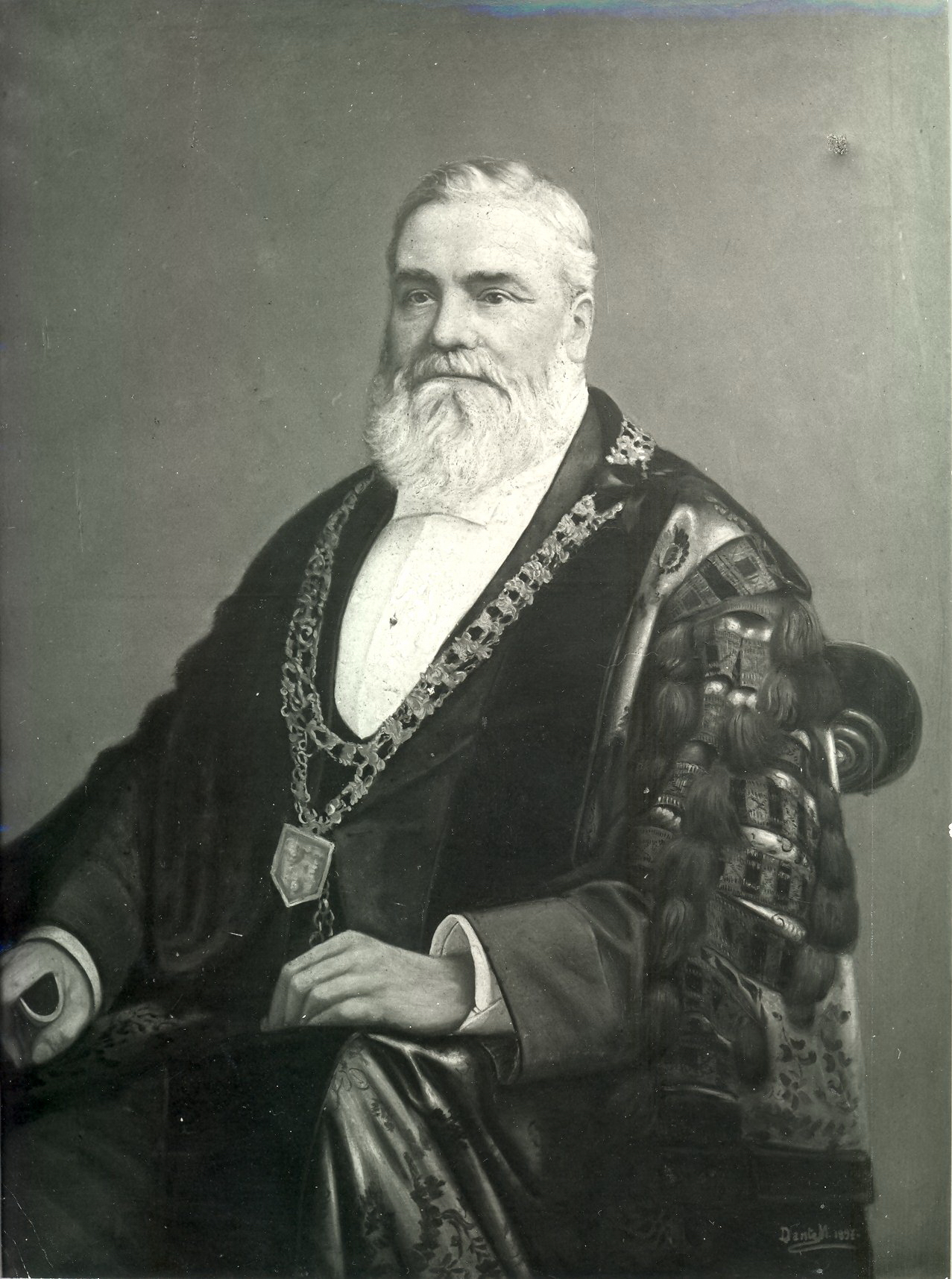
- Born: 3 March 1828; Hevingham, Norfolk, England
- Died: 27 April 1897 (aged 69); Kings Lynn, Norfolk, England
- Resting place: Hardwick Road Cemetery, Kings Lynn, England
- Occupations: Engineer, inventor

Frederick Savage (3 March 1828 – 27 April 1897) was an English engineer, inventor, and businessman.

Savage is most notable as a chief innovator in the field of steam powered fairground machinery and later as mayor of King's Lynn, Norfolk. He was the inventor of a system for running fairground carousels using a horizontally mounted steam engine at its centre. His carousels were exported all over the world. By 1870, he was manufacturing carousels with velocipedes (an early type of bicycle) and he soon began experimenting with other possibilities, including a roundabout with boats that would pitch and roll on cranks with a circular motion, a ride he called 'Sea-on-Land'.

Savage applied a similar innovation to the more traditional mount of the horse; he installed gears and offset cranks on the platform carousels, thus giving the animals their well-known up-and-down motion as they travelled around the centre pole – the "galloping horse". The platform served as a position guide for the bottom of the pole and as a place for people to walk or other stationary animals or chariots to be placed. He called this ride the 'Platform Gallopers'. He also developed the 'platform-slide' which allowed the mounts to swing out concentrically as the carousel built up speed.

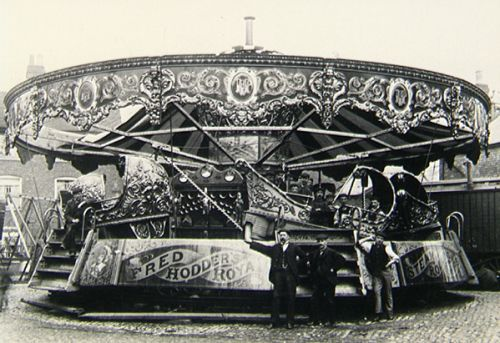
Savage's amusement ride, Sea-On-Land, where the riders would pitch up and down as if they were on the sea. His "galloping horse" innovation is seen on carousels today.

== Biography ==
Savage was born in Hevingham, Norfolk, during the reign of George IV, a period in which agriculture in the UK was at a low ebb. His early years provided him with a patchy education and he remained only semi-literate throughout his life. When his father William Savage, a weaver, was found guilty of poaching (a serious matter at that time), resulting in a sentence of 14 years penal servitude in Tasmania, Frederick’s work as a hurdle-maker on a local country estate proved inadequate to feed the family. In search of a better way of life, Savage entered the service of Thomas Cooper of the Whitesmith and Machine Maker company.

Having gained experience in mechanical engineering, Savage moved to King's Lynn at the age of twenty to work for Charles Willett, a brazier, tinplate worker, ironmonger, wholesale and retail dealer. Upon Willett's retirement two years later in 1850, he started his own business Savages Work. His new company produced engines to power agricultural machinery, as well as equipment for carousels and merry-go-rounds. The business expanded throughout the 1860s and 1870s and won international acclaim.

Savage was appointed a Justice of the Peace (JP) and was Mayor of Kings Lynn between 1889 and 1890. A monument to him in his mayoral robes was unveiled on 27 May 1892 in King's Lynn, and is found at the junction of London Road and Guanock Place. (The statue received national attention when British artist Banksy added a faux tongue and ice cream to the monument, as part of the A Great British Spraycation series of artworks; these articles were later removed by King's Lynn and West Norfolk Borough Council.) Savage died in 1897.
