= Culture Recovery Fund =

Emergency fund in Britain in response to the Covid-19 pandemic

The Culture Recovery Fund is a grants programme issued by the UK Government as a response to the COVID-19 pandemic. The fund aims to financially support cultural organisations in England (such as theatres, museums, and music venues) which had become financially unviable as a result of national and local restrictions. It is administered by Arts Council England.

== Foundation and management ==
The fund was initially announced by the Chancellor Rishi Sunak in July 2020 as a "one-off investment in UK culture". Sunak announced that the fund would be valued at £1.57 billion. Damon Buffini was announced as the chair of the Culture Recovery Board, the body tasked with managing the fund.

=== Culture Recovery Board ===
The culture recovery fund is administered by the Culture Recovery Board, which comprises 11 members appointed by the DCMS. They are:

- Sir Damon Buffini (chair)
- Lord Mendoza CBE (Commissioner for Cultural Recovery and Renewal)
- Sir Nicholas Serota CH (Chair of Arts Council England)
- Sir Laurie Magnus CBE (Chair of Historic England)
- René Olivieri (Chair of NLHF)
- Jay Hunt (Governor of the BFI, board member)
- Emma Squire (Director for Arts, Heritage and Tourism at the Department for Culture, Media and Sport)
- Claire Whitaker OBE (independent board member)
- Baroness Fall (independent board member)
- Hemant Patel MBE (independent board member)
- Samir Shah CBE c(independent board member)

== Grants issued ==
The first 135 venues to receive money from the fund were announced on 22 August 2020. This first phase included only grassroots music venues such as Birmingham's Sunflower Lounge, Brighton's Green Door Store and Manchester's Gorilla.

A large group of beneficiaries of the grants was announced on 12 October 2020. This phase totalled £257 million divided between 1,385 venues. A further announcement was made on 17 October 2020 of an additional £76 million between a further 588 organisations. The beneficiaries of this phase of the grants includes the Military Wives Choir, Somerset House, and the Puppet Theatre Barge.

The second round of large grants was issued on 2 April 2021. It distributed £262 million to 2,272 venues. The Department for Culture, Media, and Sport (DCMS) also announced it was funding £82 million of loans to cultural landmarks and institutions.

Another phase occurred in October 2021, with 142 sites receiving a share of a £35 million injection into the fund.
