= Buxton Heath =

UK Site of Special Scientific Interest

Coordinates: 52.666°N 0.974°E

- Site of Special Scientific Interest
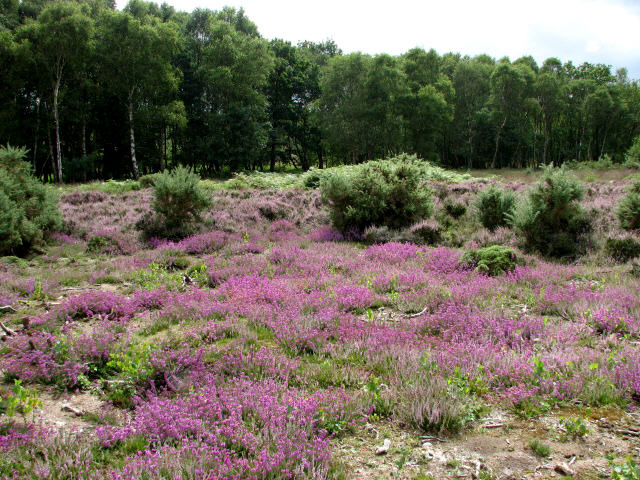
- Location of Buxton Heath.
- Area of search: Norfolk
- Grid reference: TG 174 217
- Interest: Biological
- Area: 67.3 hectares (166 acres)
- Notification date: 1986
- Location map: Magic Map

Buxton Heath is a 67.3-hectare (166-acre) biological Site of Special Scientific Interest north of Norwich in Norfolk, England. It is a Nature Conservation Review site, Grade 2, and part of the Norfolk Valley Fens Special Area of Conservation.

This site has areas of dry acidic heath on glacial sands, but the main ecological interest lies in the mire along the valley of a small stream. There are a number of rare relict mosses, liverworts and fungi, and uncommon invertebrates include one species not previously recorded in Britain.

The heath is managed by the Buxton Heath Wildlife Group.
