= Justine Themen =

British theatre director

- Occupation: Theatre director
- Notable work: Coventry City of Culture 2021 opening event

Justine Themen is a theatre director who has lived and worked in Coventry since 2003. She is currently deputy artistic director of the Belgrade Theatre in Coventry, as well as being a co-artistic director of the Belgrade's 2021 City of Culture programme.

== Career ==
Themen's work "focuses on diversifying the stories brought to the stage and reaching audiences that are typically less likely to engage with theatre and cultural programming" and has "a strong track record for co-creating work with communities & young people and for promoting & directing the work of writers of colour". Themen became a fellow of the Clore Leadership Programme in 2012, and started working at the Belgrade Theatre in 2014 with responsibility for Community and Education where she has had a "significant impact on the artistic vision" of the organisation. In March 2020 it was announced that Themen would be co-artistic director for the Belgrade's programme in the City of Culture year, 2021. In May 2020 she joined dozens of other creative leaders in signing a letter to the Secretary of State for Digital, Culture, Media and Sport urging the government to ensure that diversity in the arts is not lost due to the effects of the COVID-19 pandemic. She has also written for the industry publication Arts Professional, and sits on the boards of the Birmingham Opera Company and the Royal Shakespeare Company.

In July 2020, Themen was announced as the co-director of the Coventry UK City of Culture 2021 opening event Coventry Moves.
