= UK City of Culture =

Cultural designation in the United Kingdom

Logo used by UK Government

UK City of Culture is a designation given to a local area (specifically a city before 2025) in the United Kingdom for a period of one calendar year, during which the successful bidder hosts cultural festivities through culture-led regeneration for the year. The UK-wide programme, which is administered by the UK Government's Department for Digital, Culture, Media and Sport in collaboration with the devolved governments of Scotland, Wales, and Northern Ireland, is to "build on the success of Liverpool's year as European Capital of Culture 2008, which had significant social and economic benefits for the area". Bids solely in Greater London are excluded from the competition, although boroughs and places in the UK capital may submit a joint bid with a city or place outside of Greater London.

The designation is awarded to cities every four years, through a competition, with the inaugural holder of the title being Derry in 2013. Kingston upon Hull was the second holder of the title in 2017, and on 7 December 2017 it was declared that Coventry was designated with the title for 2021. The bidding process for the 2025 title was conducted between 2021 and 2022, with Bradford announced as the winner on 31 May 2022. The 2025 title was the first to be open to local areas across the UK.

Locations of UK Cities of Culture. Green designates the current holder of the title, red for past holders, and blue for the upcoming holder.

== History ==
=== Establishment ===
In January 2009, it was announced that then Culture Secretary Andy Burnham was considering establishing a British City of Culture prize and that the winning city might possibly host events such as the Turner Prize, Brit Awards, Man Booker Prize and the Stirling Prize. Phil Redmond was invited to chair a panel set up to consider the proposal, with a remit including deciding how often the prize should be awarded. A working group was established in March and reported in June 2009, suggesting that the designation be given to a city once every four years starting in 2013.

The working group stated in its report that the same calendar of events, such as hosting the Brit Awards, should not be staged by each designated City of Culture. Rather, they suggested that the events held in the city should be decided on a case-by-case basis. The report lists possible core events, including those run by the BBC, Sony, the Poetry Book Society, the UK Film Council, the Tate, VisitEngland, VisitBritain, the Museums Association, the Heritage Lottery Fund, English Heritage, Channel 4 and the Arts Council England.

=== Title holders ===
==== Derry~Londonderry 2013 ====
Following the report of the working group, Burnham's successor as Culture Secretary, Ben Bradshaw, announced a competition to select the first UK City of Culture in July 2009. The deadline for initial bids was 11 December 2009, with shortlisted cities having until 28 May to make their final bids. A total of 14 cities applied, with four (Birmingham, Derry, Norwich and Sheffield) shortlisted. At a special televised ceremony in Liverpool on 15 July 2010, Culture Minister Ed Vaizey announced that Derry would be the first ever UK City of Culture. The festival was spearheaded by Culture Company 2013 and they branded the city as "Derry~Londonderry".

==== Hull 2017 ====
Logo of Hull City of Culture 2017

After 2013, the next UK City of Culture was scheduled for 2017. Officials from Aberdeen stated they would bid for the title, as did officials from Dundee, while local officials from Colchester, Derby, Leicester, Plymouth, Stoke-on-Trent, Swansea, Hull, and York suggested that those cities would bid for the 2017 title. On 18 April 2013, the Hampshire Chamber of Commerce announced that Portsmouth and Southampton were making a joint bid for the 2017 title. There was also a bid from East Kent (Canterbury, Ashford, Folkestone, Dover and Thanet), and another from Hastings and Bexhill-on-Sea, supported by celebrity Graham Norton.

In June 2013 the shortlist of four bids from Dundee, Hull, Leicester and Swansea Bay was announced. The winner of the 2017 title was announced on 20 November 2013 and Hull was chosen. TV producer Phil Redmond, who chaired the City of Culture panel, said Hull was the unanimous choice because it put forward "the most compelling case based on its theme as 'a city coming out of the shadows'". On 31 July 2014, Martin Green was announced as chief executive of the team. Green was previously head of ceremonies for the 2012 Summer Olympics, and organised the 2014 Tour de France Grand Départ ceremony in Yorkshire.

On 1 January 2017, the Hull event opened with a fireworks display over the Humber Estuary and a series of sound and light installations collectively known as Made in Hull, which reportedly attracted more than 25,000 visitors. By the end of the first week, the BBC was reporting that 342,000 people had participated in the opening events. The event included multimedia sound and light projections onto landmark buildings in the city's Victoria Square as well as a display of Hullywood Icons featuring local people recreating famous scenes from film.

The BBC reported that a report by Hull University in March 2018 found Hull's status as the UK City of Culture attracted more than five million people, £220 million of investment and 800 new jobs.

==== Coventry 2021 ====
Swansea, Paisley, Stoke-on-Trent, Coventry and Sunderland were all shortlisted to be the third UK City of Culture. Coventry's win was announced by arts minister John Glen in Hull and broadcast live on The One Show on 7 December 2017. Glen said it was "an incredible opportunity for Coventry to boost investment in the local economy, grow tourism and put arts and culture centre stage". In July 2020 it was announced that the start of Coventry's year as City of Culture had been put back to May 2021 because of the COVID-19 pandemic. The city has received more than £15.5 million in support from the UK Government to support the annual festivities, with a further £100 million raised in capital investment for the city to support city cultural projects such as Herbert Art Gallery and Museum, Coventry Cathedral and Belgrade Theatre.

==== Bradford 2025 ====
On 31 May 2022, Bradford was announced as the 2025 holder of the title, with the three runners-up receiving £125,000. The bidding contest was conducted between 2021 and 2022. A record twenty bids were submitted from various cities and regions across the UK. On 8 October 2021, eight bids were longlisted, them being; Armagh City, Banbridge and Craigavon, Bradford, Cornwall, County Durham, Derby, Southampton, Stirling, and Wrexham County Borough. On 18 March 2022 this was shortened to just Bradford, Durham, Southampton and Wrexham.

The other failed bids include; Bangor, Borderlands (Note: comprising Dumfries and Galloway, Scottish Borders, Northumberland, Cumbria and Carlisle City), Conwy, Lancashire, Medway, Newport, Powys, Tay Cities (also including Fife), Torbay and Exeter, Wakefield, Wolverhampton, and Great Yarmouth & East Suffolk. Cambridgeshire and Peterborough and Plymouth had both expressed interest in bids, but were not included in the applicant list. Bids from Northampton, Norwich, the Tees Valley, Luton, and Gloucester were withdrawn or ruled out before the final application deadline.

The holder was originally set to be announced in December 2021, but was postponed due to the number of applicants, with a longlist released on 8 October 2021. The final application deadline was on 26 January 2022 with the shortlist of four bidding places released on 18 March 2022 (with visits to the shortlisted places conducted in Spring 2022), and the 2025 holder Bradford was announced on 31 May 2022 live on The One Show.

==== 2029 ====
The bidding contest for the 2029 title is being conducted between 2025 and 2026. Blackpool, Bristol, Exeter, Ipswich, Plymouth, Portsmouth, Swindon, and Wrexham all declared intentions to bid. Following the deadline for expressions of interest on 8 February 2026, a longlist of nine places was announced in March 2026, with a four-place shortlist due to be submitted to the Secretary of State for Culture, Media and Sport in autumn 2026. The winning place is expected to be announced before the end of 2026.

The places included on the longlist announced in March 2026 were Blackpool, Inverness–Highlands, Ipswich, Middlesbrough, Milton Keynes, Portsmouth, Sheffield, Swindon, Wrexham.

== List of UK Cities of Culture ==
Year	Winning city	Other shortlisted cities	Date announced
2013	Derry	Birmingham, Norwich, Sheffield	15 July 2010
2017	Kingston upon Hull	Dundee, Leicester, Swansea Bay	20 November 2013
2021	Coventry	Paisley, Stoke-on-Trent, Sunderland, Swansea	7 December 2017
2025	Bradford	County Durham, Southampton, Wrexham	31 May 2022
2029	TBA	Short-List: Blackpool, Milton Keynes, Sheffield, and Wrexham	May 2027

== See also ==
- UK Town of Culture
