= Street art in Melbourne =

Diverse range of street art and associated subcultures of Melbourne, Australia

Melbourne, the capital of Victoria and the largest city in Australia, has gained international acclaim for its diverse range of street art and associated subcultures. Throughout the 1970s and 1980s, much of the city's disaffected youth were influenced by the graffiti of New York City, which subsequently became popular in Melbourne's inner suburbs, and along suburban railway and tram lines.

Melbourne was a major city in which stencil art was embraced at an early stage, earning it the title of "stencil capital of the world"; the adoption of stencil art also increased public awareness of the concept of street art. The first stencil festival in the world was held in Melbourne in 2004 and featured the work of many major international artists.

== History ==
Melbourne is the proud capital of street painting with stencils. Its large, colonial-era walls and labyrinth of back alleys drip with graffiti that is more diverse and original than any other city in the world.

— Banksy, 2006

Around the turn of the 21st century, forms of street art that began appearing in Melbourne included woodblocking, sticker art, poster art, wheatpasting, graphs, various forms of street installations and reverse graffiti. A strong sense of community ownership and DIY ethic exists amongst street artists in Melbourne, many of whom act as activists through awareness.

Galleries in the City Centre and inner suburbs now exhibit street art. Prominent Melbourne street artists were featured in Space Invaders, a 2010 exhibition of street art held at the National Gallery of Australia in Canberra. Hosier Lane is Melbourne's most famous laneway for street art, however there are many other laneways in the inner city that exhibit street art.

Prominent international street artists such as Banksy (UK), ABOVE (USA), Fafi (France), D*FACE (UK), Logan Hicks, Revok (USA), Blek le Rat (France), Shepard Fairey (USA) and Invader (France) have contributed work to Melbourne's streets along with visitors from all over the world, most prominently Germany, Canada, the United States, the United Kingdom and New Zealand.

Melbourne's street art scene was explored in the 2005 feature documentary RASH. Official website (archived) RASH on Mutiny Media website

== Locations ==
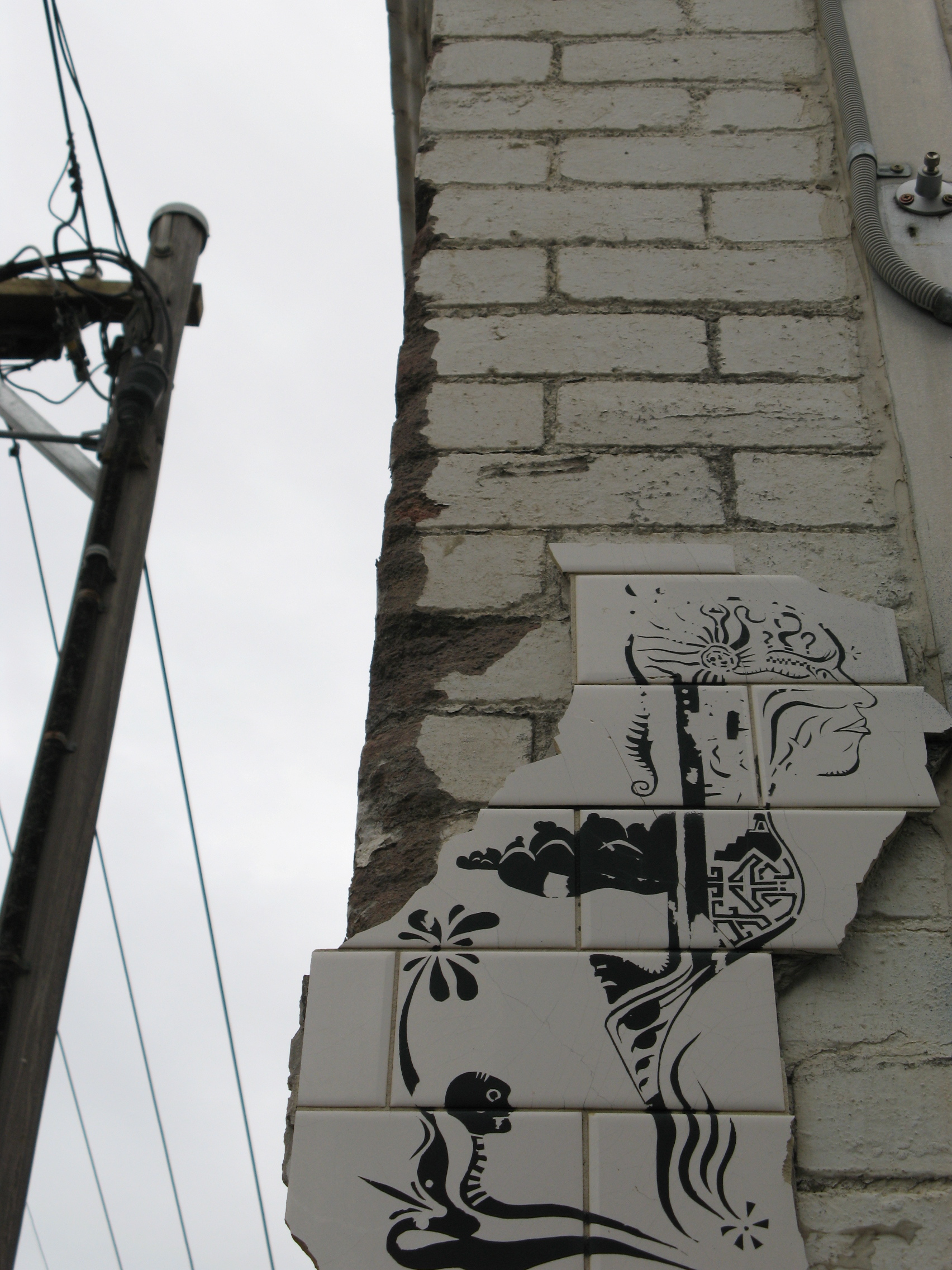
Ceramic street art on the corner of a brick building in Fitzroy, 2008

While there are small areas throughout Greater Melbourne where various forms of street art can be seen, the primary areas in which street art is most densely located include:

- Abbotsford
- Brunswick and Brunswick East
- Carlton and Carlton North
- Collingwood
- Fitzroy and Fitzroy North
- Footscray
- Melbourne central business district
- Northcote and Westgarth
- Prahran
- Richmond
- South Yarra
- St Kilda

== Public and government responses ==
The proliferation of street art in Melbourne has attracted supporters and detractors from various levels of government and in the broader community. In 2008 a tourism campaign at Florida's Disney World recreated a Melbourne laneway cityscape, decorated with street art. Victorian Premier John Brumby forced the tourism department to withdraw the display, calling graffiti a "blight on the city" and not something "we want to be displaying overseas." Marcus Westbury countered that street art was one of Melbourne's "biggest tourist attractions and one of its most significant cultural movements since the Heidelberg School".

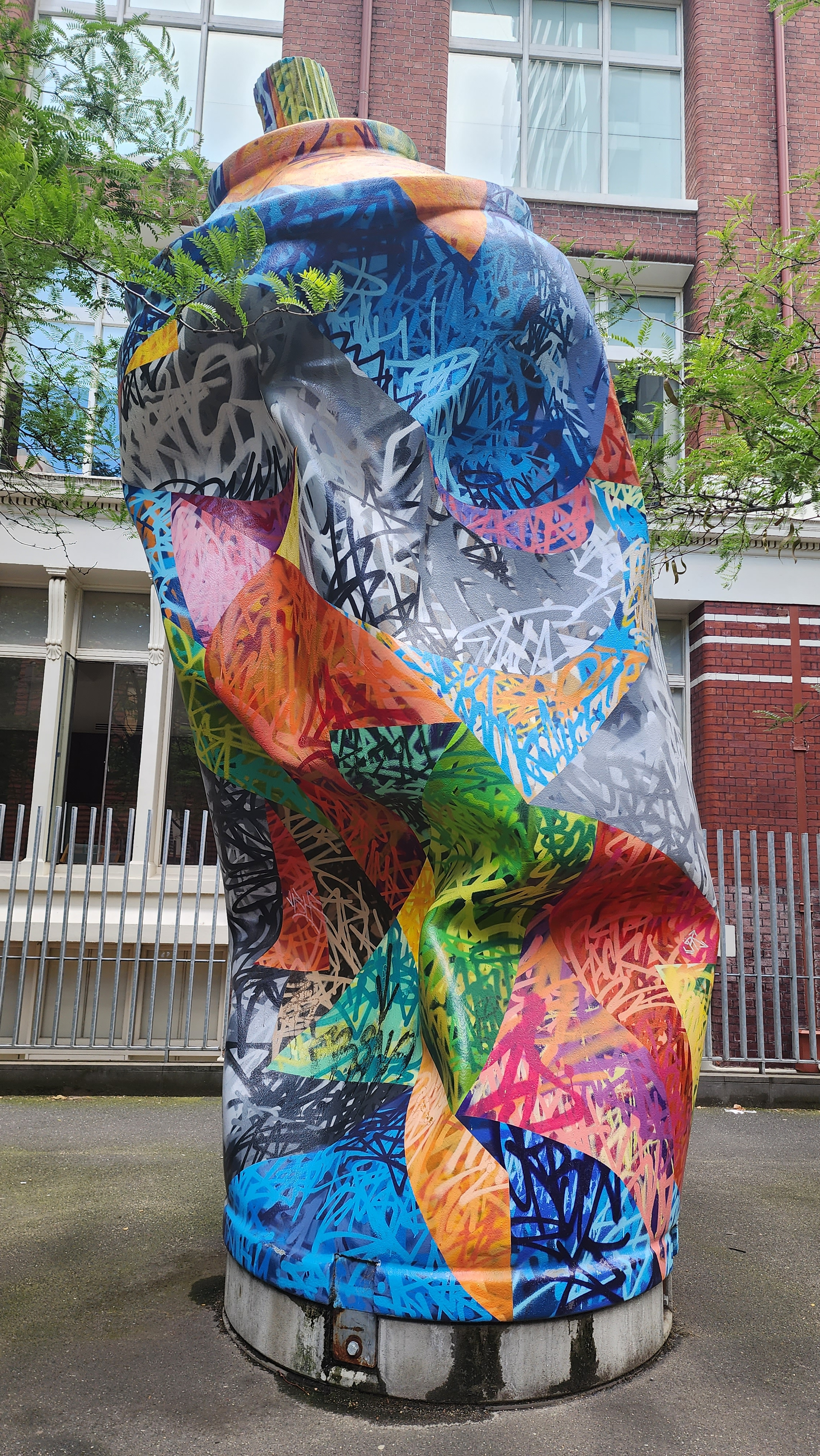
Crushed Can, a sculpture by street artist Ling, Wills Street

Some street artists and academics have criticised the State Government for having seemingly inconsistent and contradictory views on graffiti. In 2006, the State Government "proudly sponsored" The Melbourne Design Guide, a book which celebrates Melbourne graffiti from a design perspective. That same year, some of Melbourne's graffiti-covered laneways were featured in Tourism Victoria's Lose Yourself in Melbourne campaign. One year later, the State Government introduced tough anti-graffiti laws, with a maximum penalty of two years in prison. Possession of spray cans "without a lawful excuse", either on or around public transport, became illegal, and police search powers were also strengthened. According to Melbourne University criminologist Alison Young, the "state is profiting from the work of artists doing it, but another arm of the state wants to prosecute and possibly imprison (such) people." Since laws were tightened, local councils have reported a "spike" in vandalism and an increase in tagging on commissioned murals and legal street art. Adrian Doyle, founder of the Blender Studios and manager of Melbourne Street Art Tours, believes that people who tag have become less considerate of where they put their tags for fear of being caught by police, and are "paranoid so they are taking less time—tags are less detailed". In 2007, the City of Melbourne started the Do art not tags initiative—an education presentation aimed at teaching primary school students the differences between graffiti and street art.

Some local councils have accepted street art and have even made efforts to preserve it. In early 2008, the Melbourne City Council installed a perspex screen to prevent a 2003 Banksy stencil art piece named Little Diver from being destroyed. In December 2008, silver paint was poured behind the protective screen and tagged with the words: "Banksy woz ere". In April 2010, another stencil by Banksy, also painted in 2003, was destroyed—this time by council workers. The work depicted a parachuting rat and it was believed to be the last surviving Banksy stencil in Melbourne's laneways. Lord Mayor Robert Doyle said: "This was not the Mona Lisa. It is regrettable that we have lost it, but it was an honest mistake by our cleaners in removing tagging graffiti."

The loss of these and other famous street artworks in Melbourne reignited a decade long debate over heritage protection for Melbourne's street art. Planning Minister Justin Madden announced government plans in 2010 involving Heritage Victoria and the National Trust of Australia to assess street art in key locations throughout Melbourne and for culturally significant works to receive recognition for the purpose of preservation. Examples of street art pieces that have been added to the Victorian Heritage Register include: the 1983 mural outside the Aborigines Advancement League building, and a 1984 Keith Haring mural in Collingwood.

The Melbourne City Council acknowledged the difficulties that hinder the preservation of street art, with their graffiti management plan for 2014–18 stating: "Protection of street art is not practical. The only exception may be especially commissioned works".

== Events ==
She's Only Dancing by Vexta (left), and work by PETS (right), in Hosier Lane, 2007

- Empty shows: illegal exhibitions held in derelict buildings since circa 2000
- Stencil Festival: The first stencil art festival in the world was held in Melbourne in 2004. It was held annually until 2010.
- Street video projection event: video projection events were held in Gertrude Street, Fitzroy in mid-2008.

=== Melbourne Stencil Festival ===
The Melbourne Stencil Festival was Australia's premier celebration of international street and stencil art. Since its inauguration in 2004 the festival has become an annual event, touring regional Victoria and other locations within Australia. The festival was held for 10 days each year, involving exhibitions, live demonstrations, artist talks, panel discussions, workshops, master classes and street art related films to the general public. It featured works by emerging and established artists from both Australia and around the world.

Since its inception, the Stencil Festival featured some 800 works by over 150 artists, many of whom were experiencing their first major art exhibition, finding it difficult to be exhibited in major commercial galleries reluctant to display emerging art forms. The first Melbourne Stencil Festival was held in a former sewing factory in North Melbourne in 2004.

- 2004 – The inaugural festival was held over three days in a warehouse in North Melbourne.
- 2005 – Featured a ten-day exhibition at the refurbished Meat Market art complex. The festival was supported by the City of Melbourne and saw more than 700 visitors on the opening night.
- 2006 – The festival moved to Fitzroy, a major location of street art in Melbourne, and was held at the Rose Street Artists Market. For the first time the four-day event was also held in Sydney. It received reviews in major mainstream media in both Melbourne and Sydney.
- 2007 – Featured a total of 75 artists from 12 countries with more than 300 works. The Melbourne event alone was attended by more than 4,000 visitors with 500 people on the opening night alone. It also attracted a wide range of media coverage including daily newspapers, community radio and street press.
- 2008 – Toured regionally with the support of Arts Victoria to Ballarat, Sale and Shepparton, and on its own effort interstate to Sydney, Brisbane and Perth.
- 2009 – The Melbourne Stencil Festival 2009 ran between 25 September and 4 October 2009.
- 2010 – The Melbourne Stencil Festival transformed in the "Sweet Streets" Festival, an all encompassing festival of street and urban art. It ran between 8 – 24 October 2010.

=== All Your Walls ===
An event in which the entire iconic Hosier lane was repainted by over 150 artists. Produced by Invurt, Just Another Agency and Land of Sunshine in conjunction with the National Gallery of Victoria. It ran between 27–29 November 2013.

== Notable Melbourne street artists ==
- Dlux – since 2002
- Psycaligrafii - since 2011
- Civilian – since 2001
- Facter – since 1990
- HA-HA
- Heesco – since 2010
- Jisoe – since 2000
- Lushsux – since 2010
- Meek – since 2003
- Nurock – since 1995
- Phibs
- Prism – since 2001
- Rone – since 2002
- Shida – since 2004
- Vexta – since 2003
- ZAM-1
- Pam the Bird – since 2023

== Other media ==
- RASH (2005) – Feature-length documentary film which explores the cultural value of Melbourne street art and graffiti.
- Not Quite Art (2007) – ABC TV series, episode 101 explored Melbourne's street art and DIY culture.

== Gallery ==
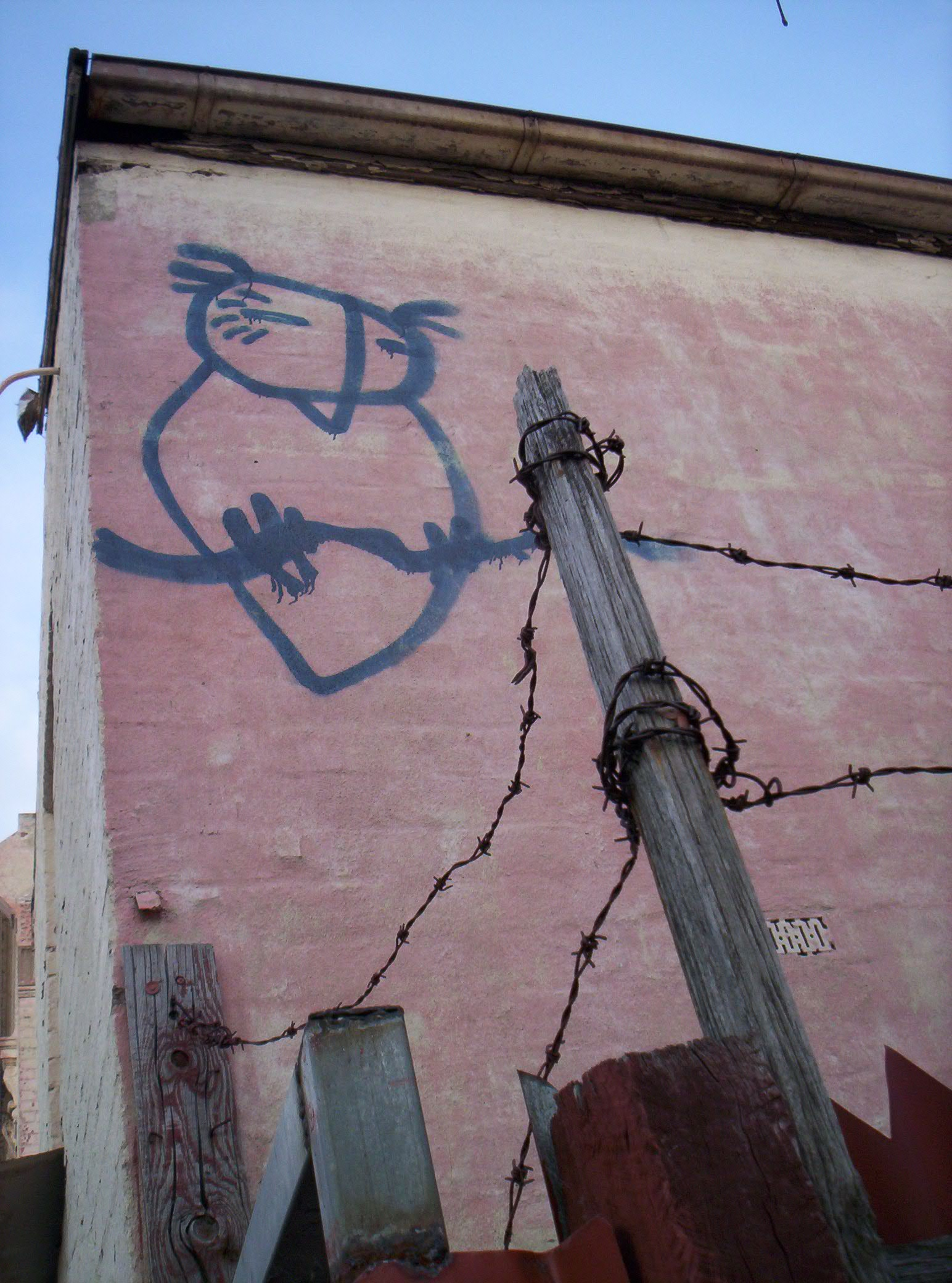
Antipoet, 2004

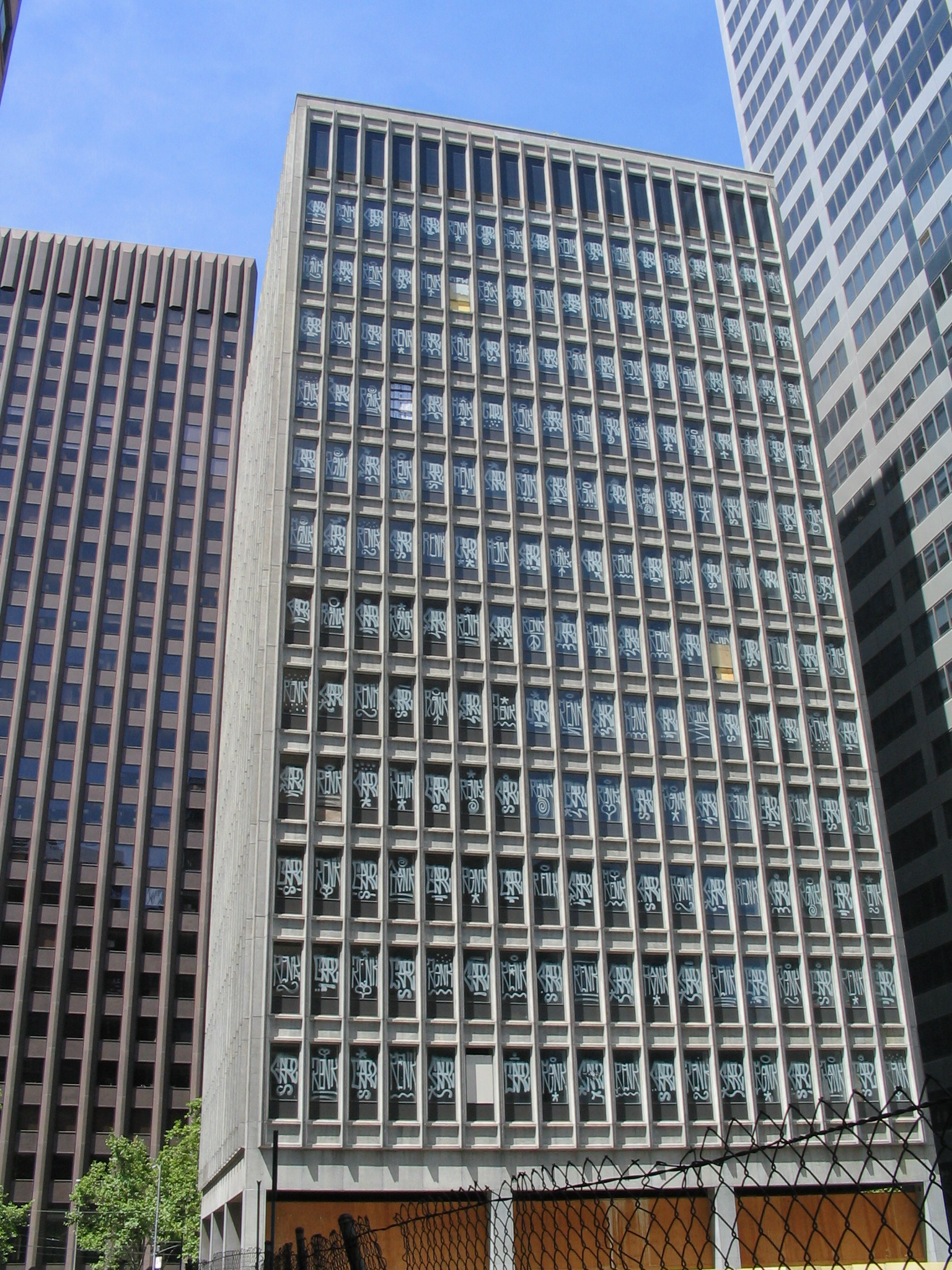
70k crew members Renks and Karl 123 tag every window of an abandoned office building, 2005

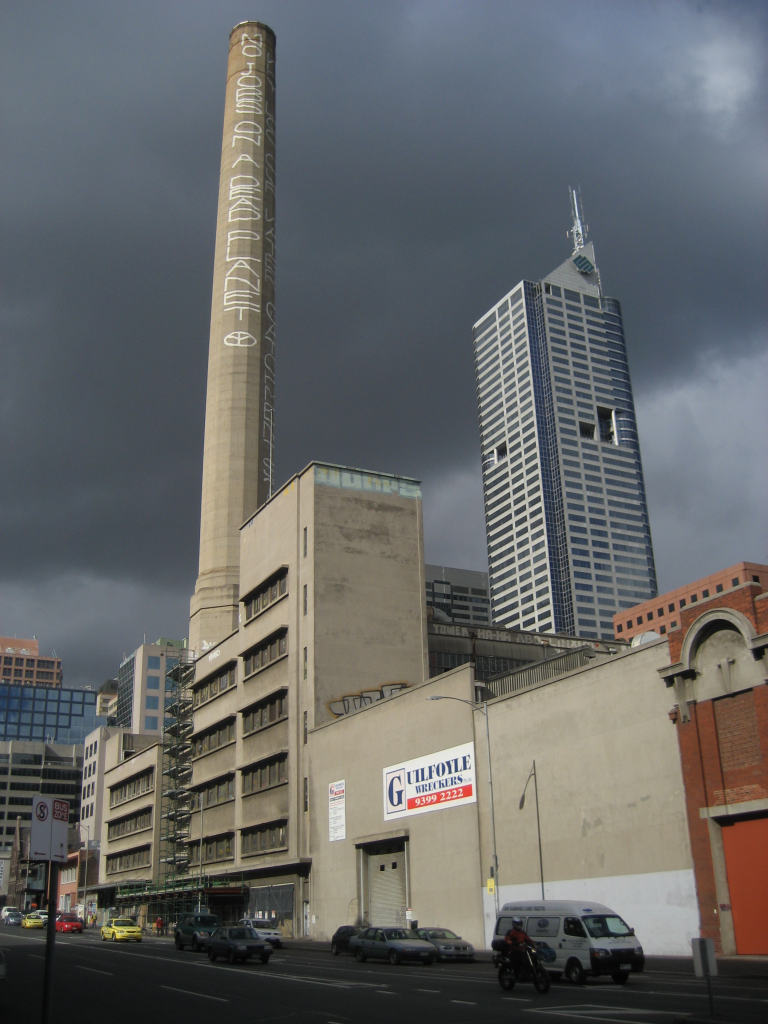
"No jobs on a dead planet" written on the former Spencer Street Power Station, 2007

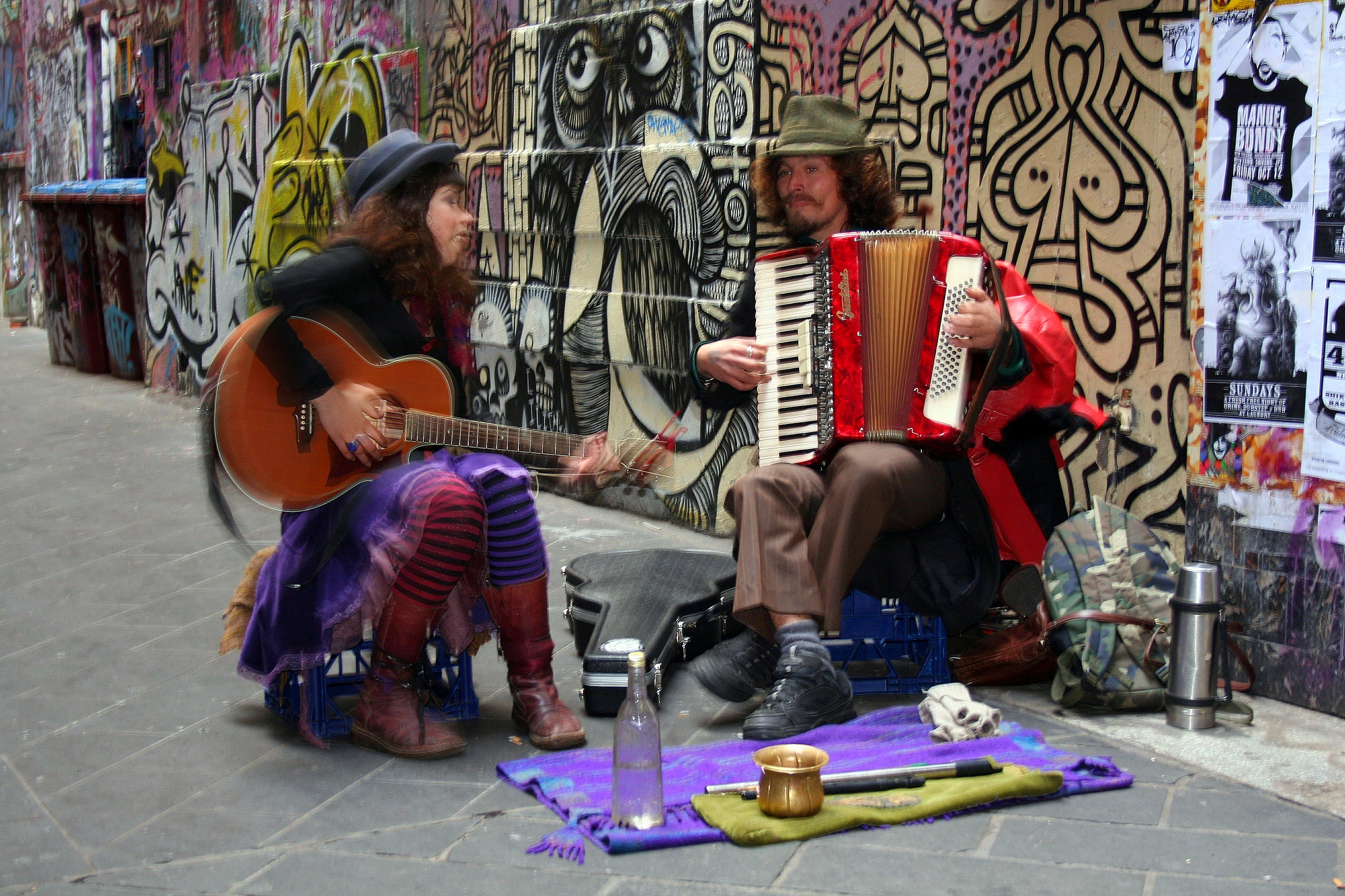
Buskers perform in front of street murals near Degraves Street, 2007

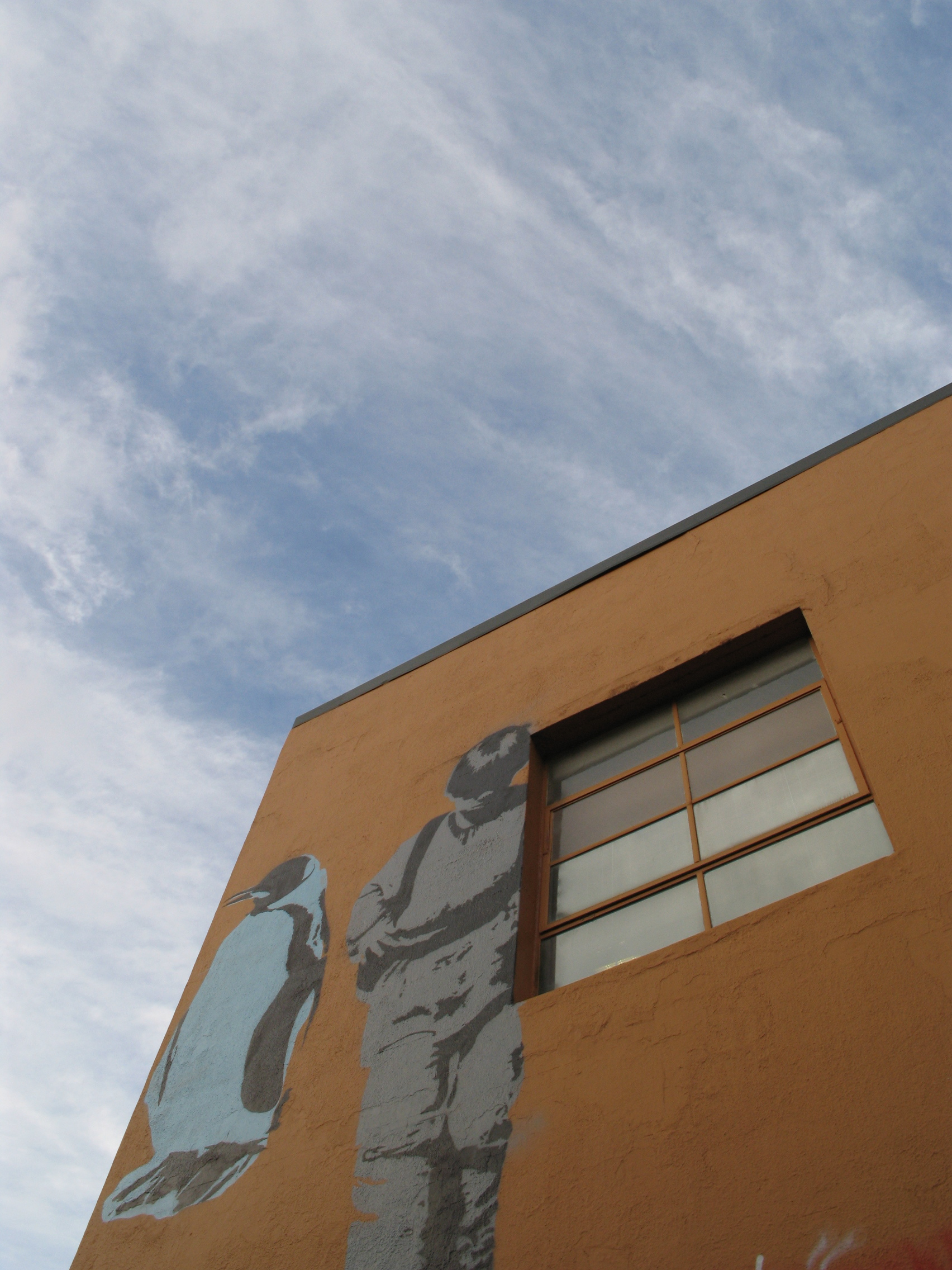
Unknown artist, Fitzroy, 2007

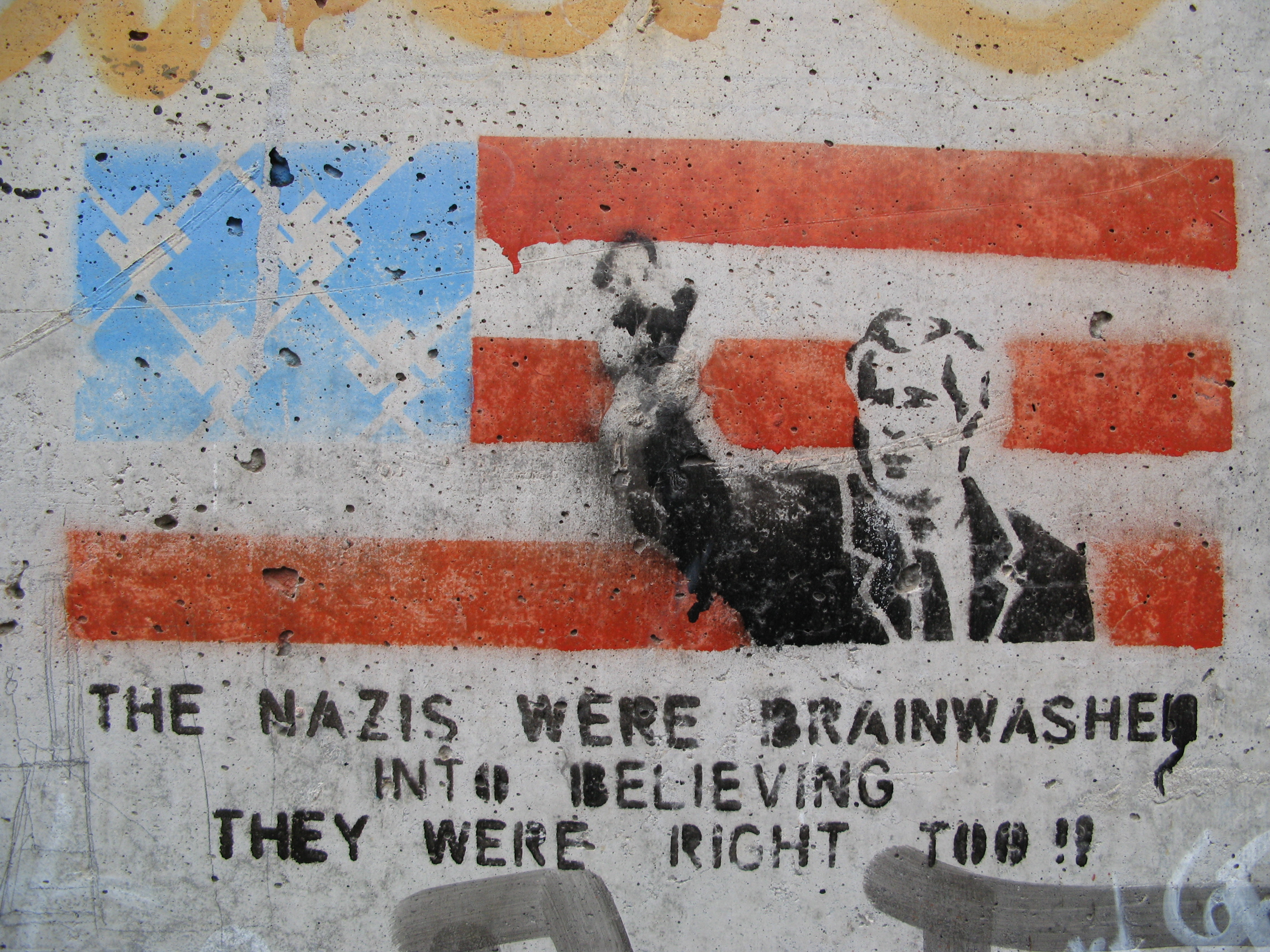
Unknown artist, 2008

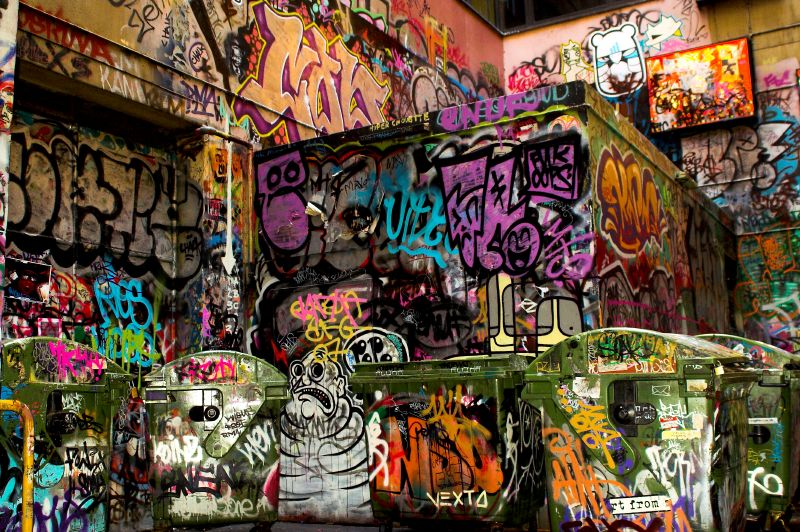
Stickers, stencils and other forms of street art fall victim to over-tagging in Centre Place, 2008.

Union Lane project by City of Melbourne, 2008

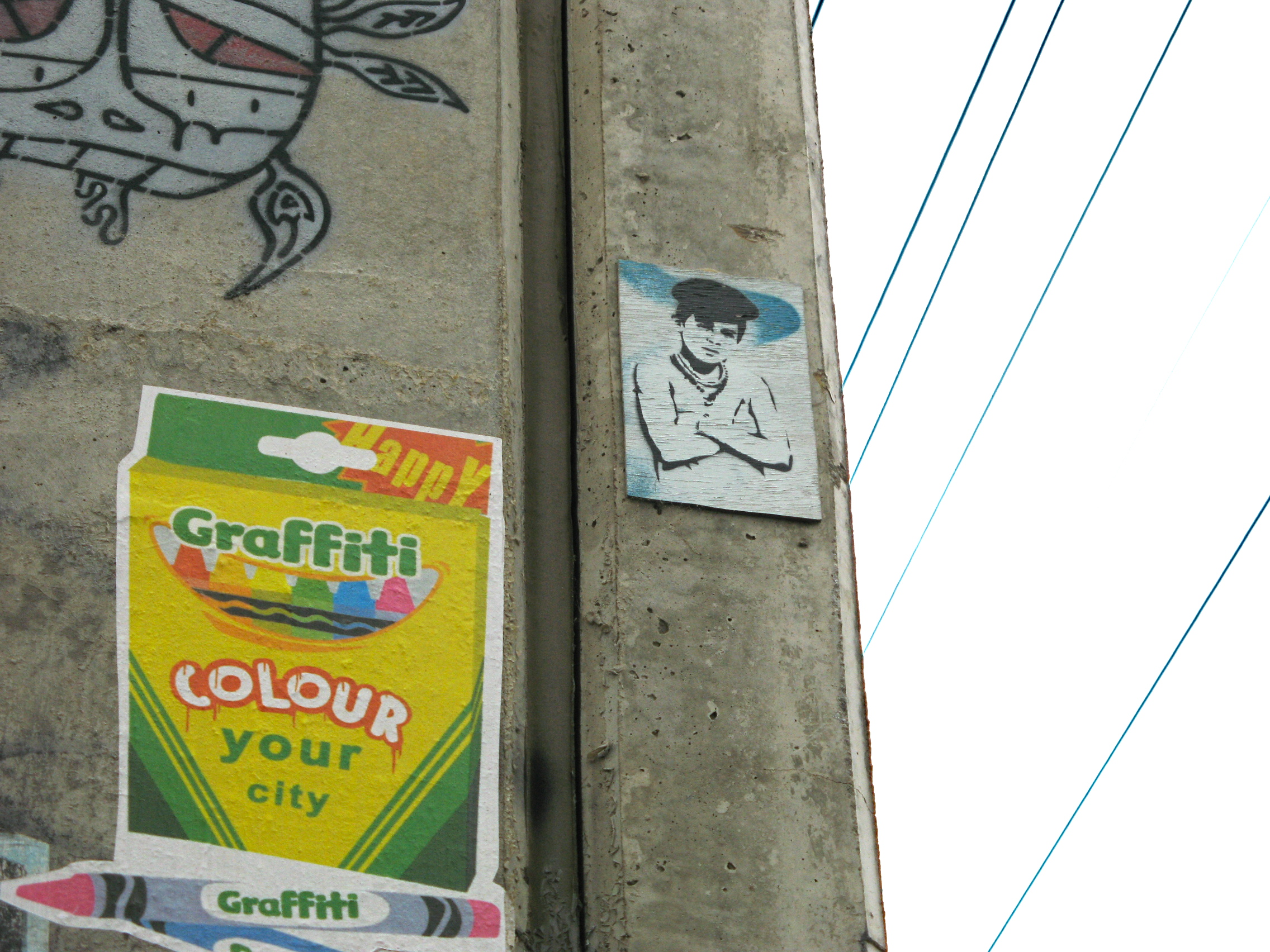
Unknown artists, 2008

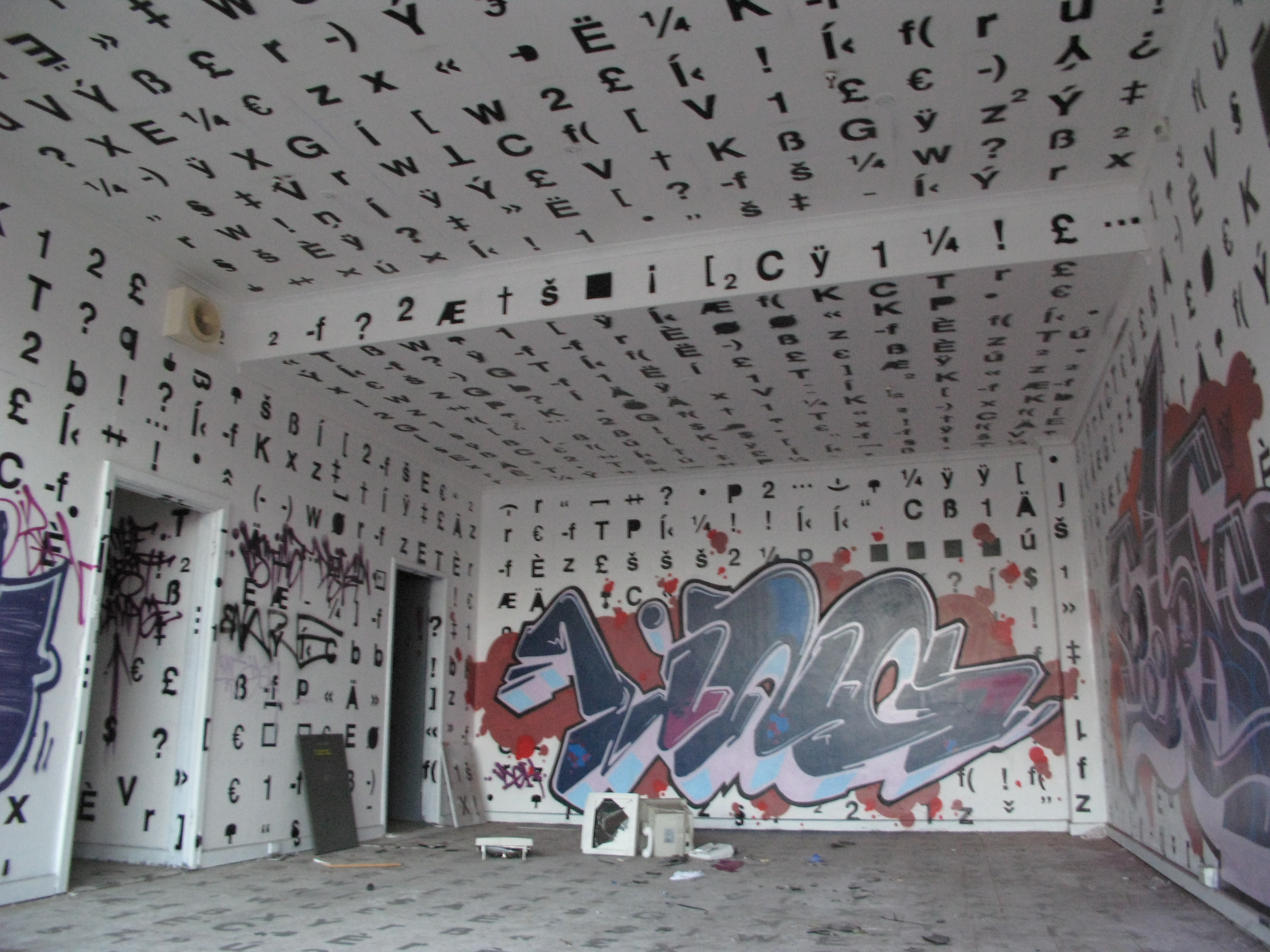
Street art in an abandoned warehouse in Collingwood, 2009

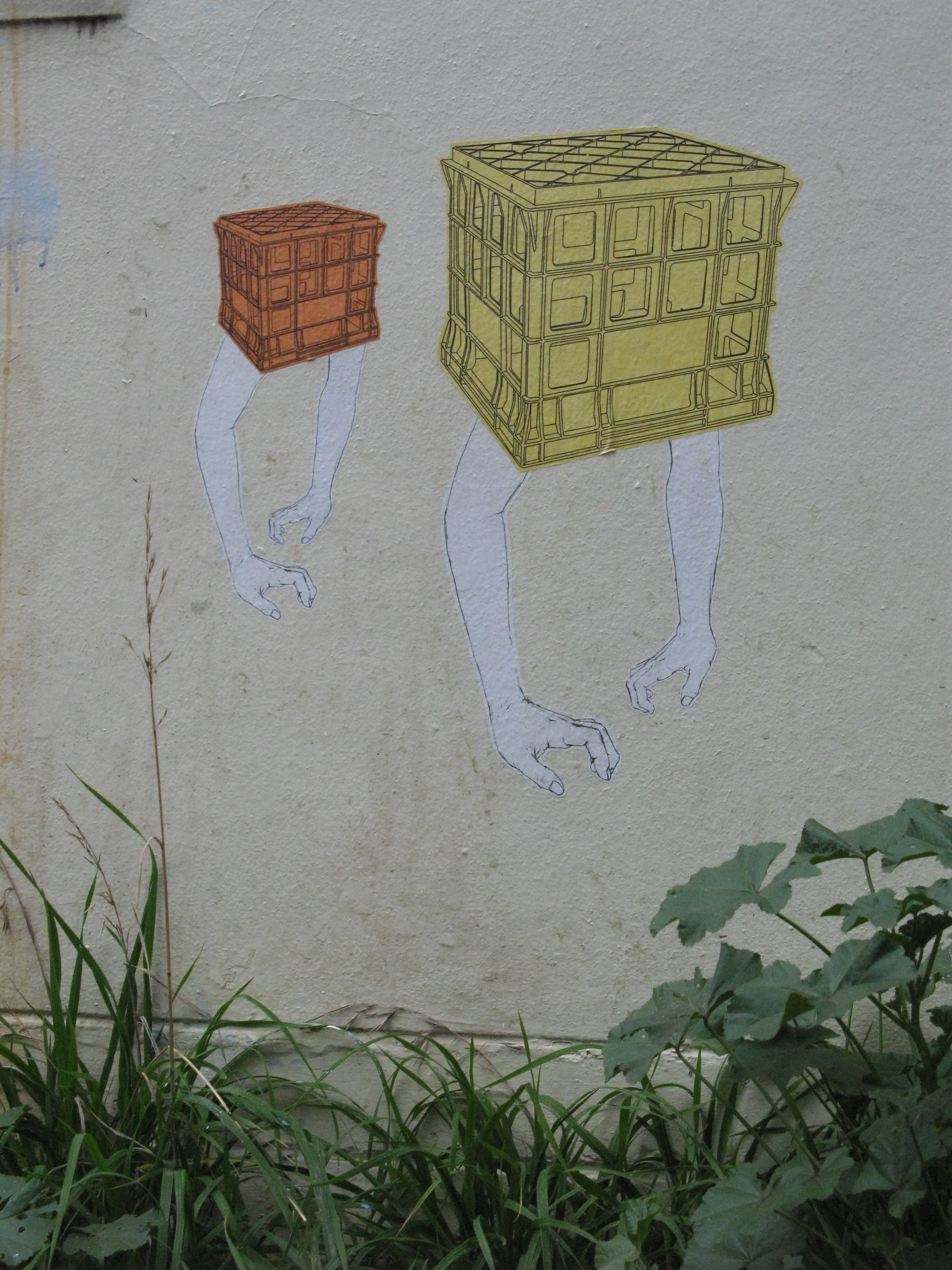
Unknown artist, Brunswick, 2009

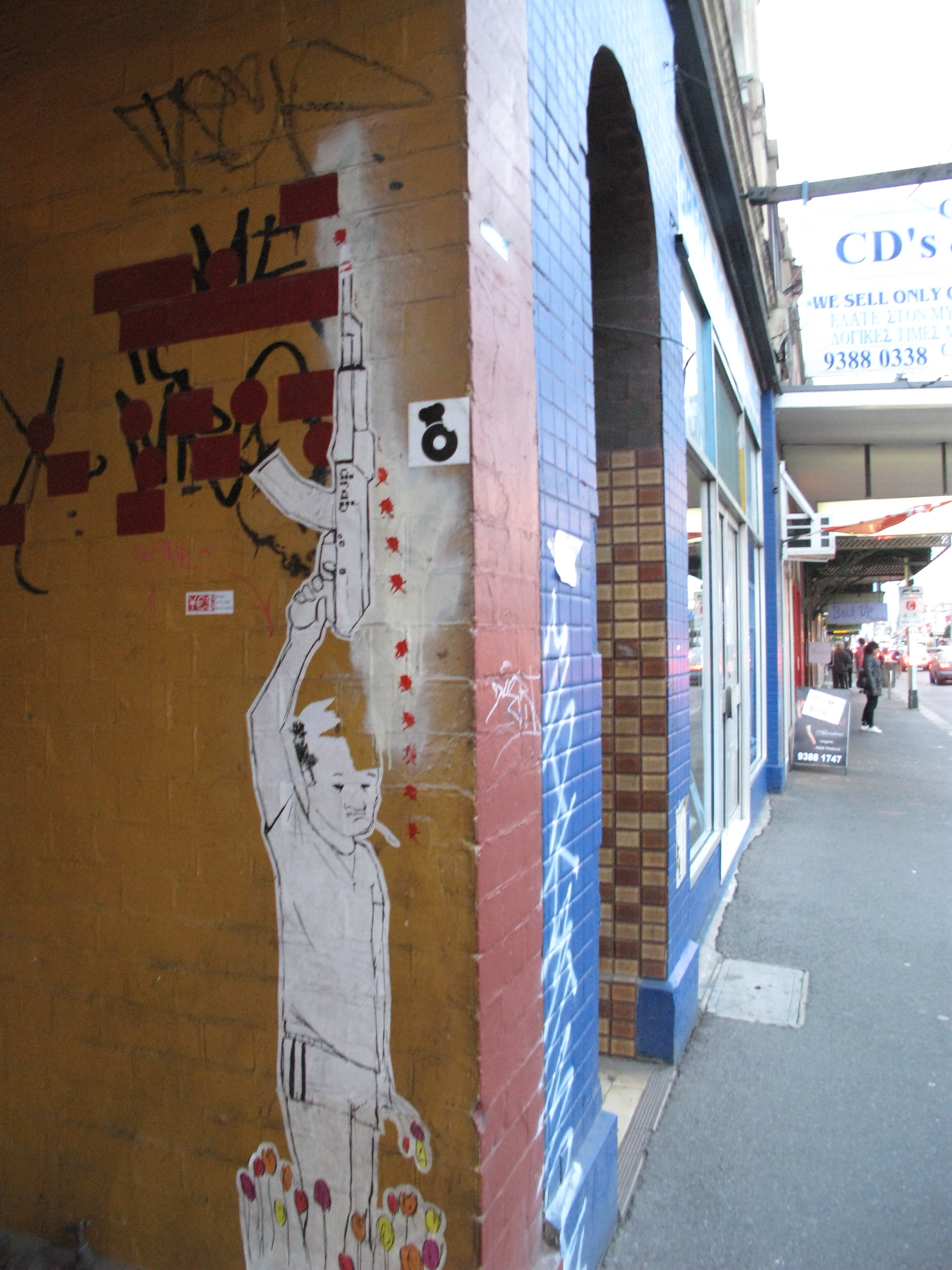
Wheatpaste by Drab, Brunswick, 2009

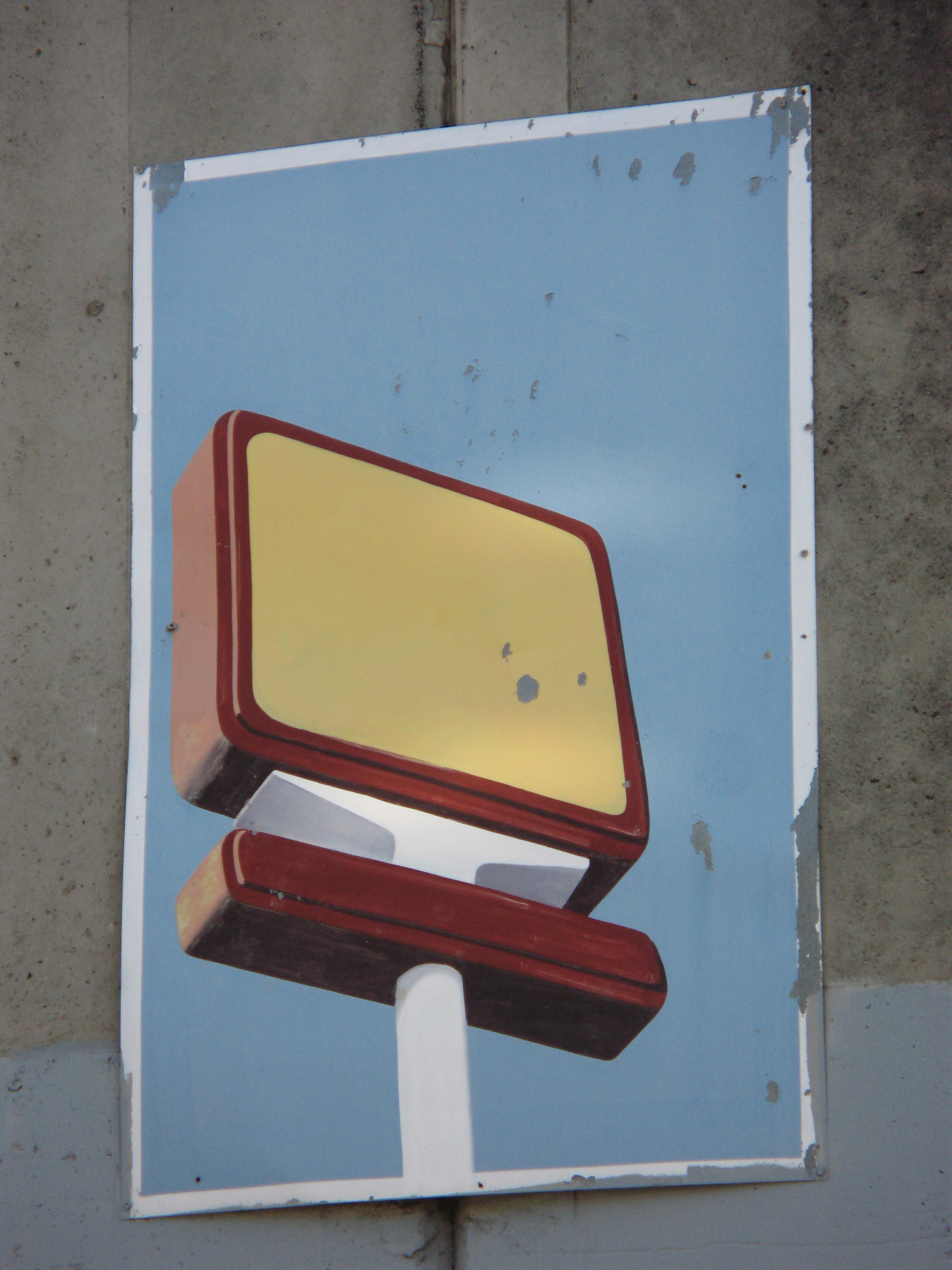
Large painted board fixed to concrete wall, Richmond, 2010

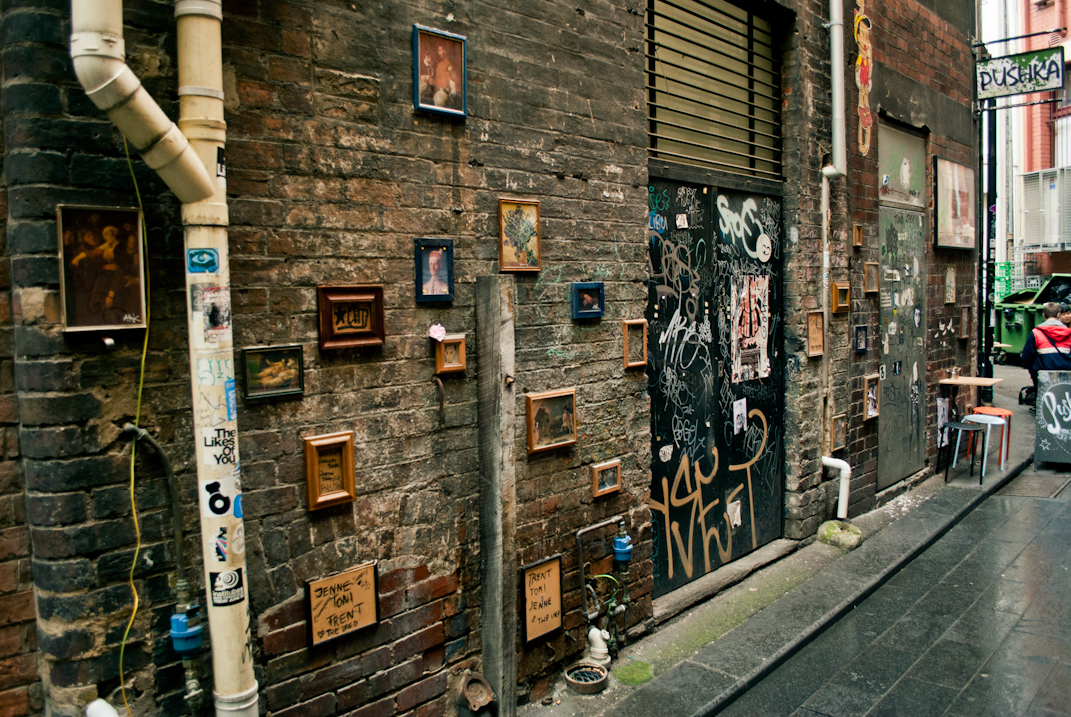
Picture frames in Presgrave Place, 2010

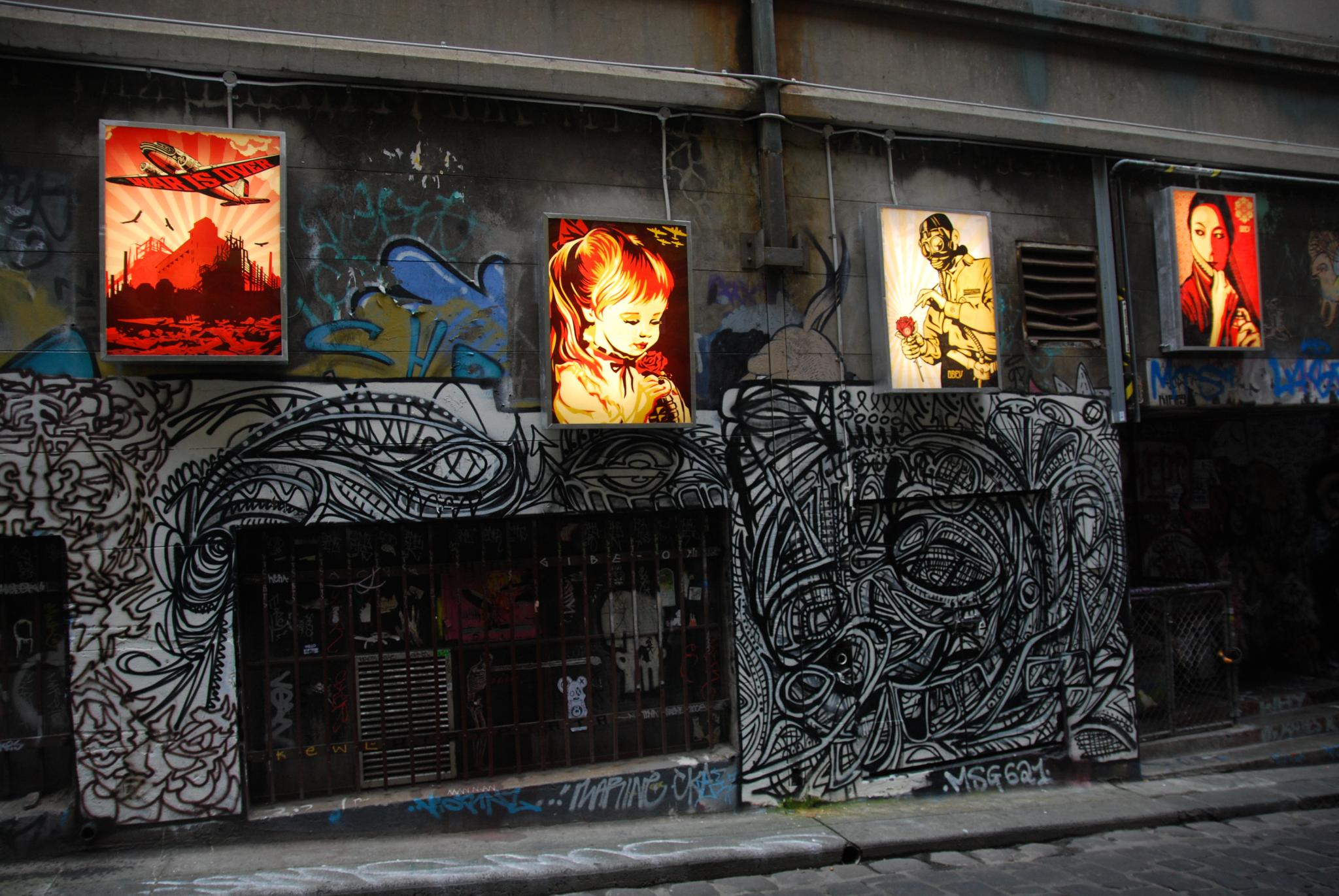
Light-box installations in Hosier Lane, 2010; part of the City of Melbourne's annual Laneway Commissions program.

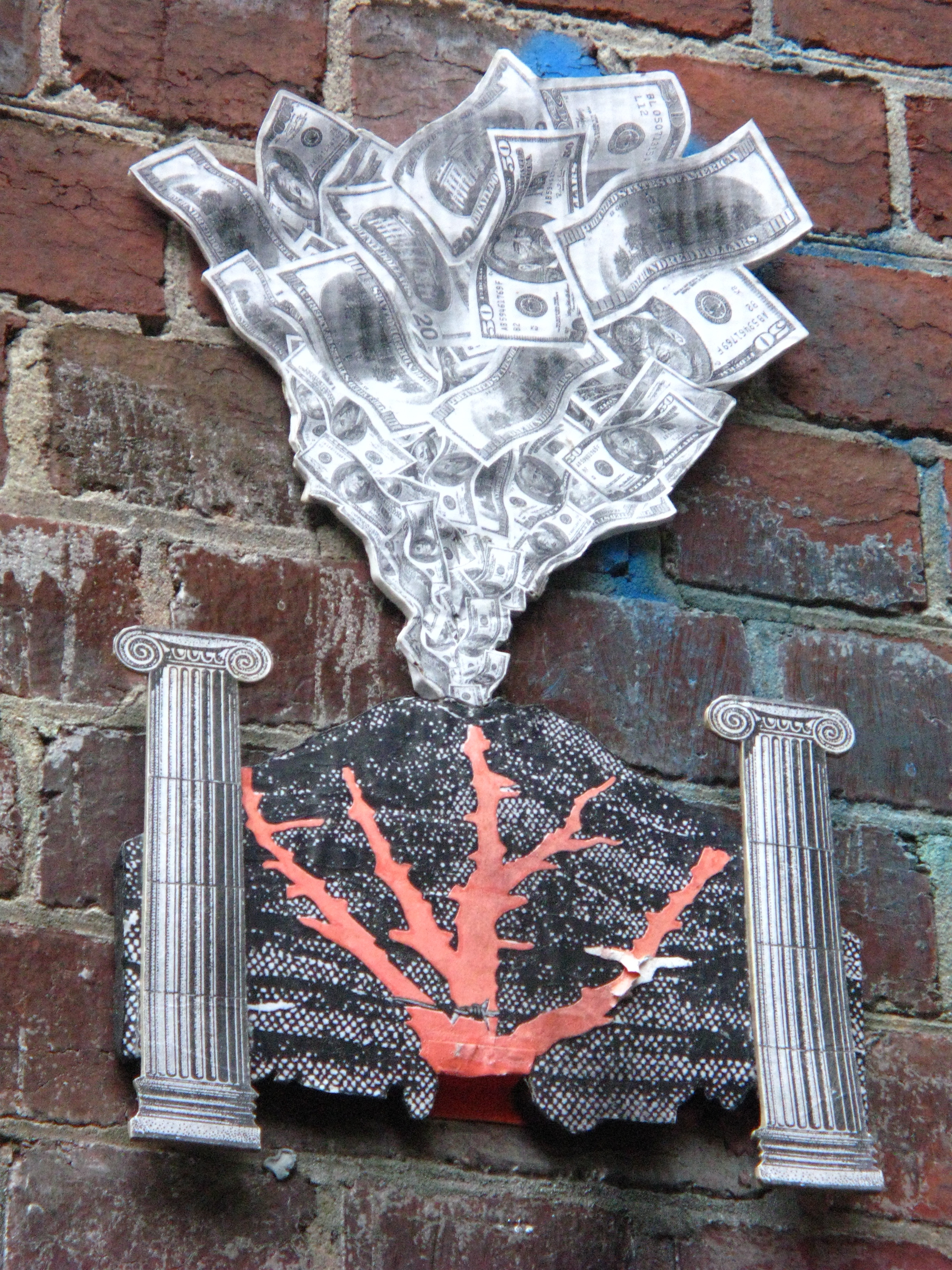
Money Volcano, Phoenix the Street Artist, Hosier Lane CBD, 2010

== See also ==
- Street art
- Graffiti
- Culture of Melbourne
- Lanes and arcades of Melbourne
- List of Australian street artists
- List of public art in Melbourne
- List of sporting street art in Australia

Other Australian cities:

- Newtown area graffiti and street art, Sydney
- Street art in Adelaide

Media

- Stencil art
- Woodblocking
- Sticker art
- Poster art
- Wheatpasting
- Street installation

Concepts

- Public art
- Public space
- Community ownership
- Reverse graffiti
