= Street art in Adelaide =

Street art and subculture in Adelaide, Australia

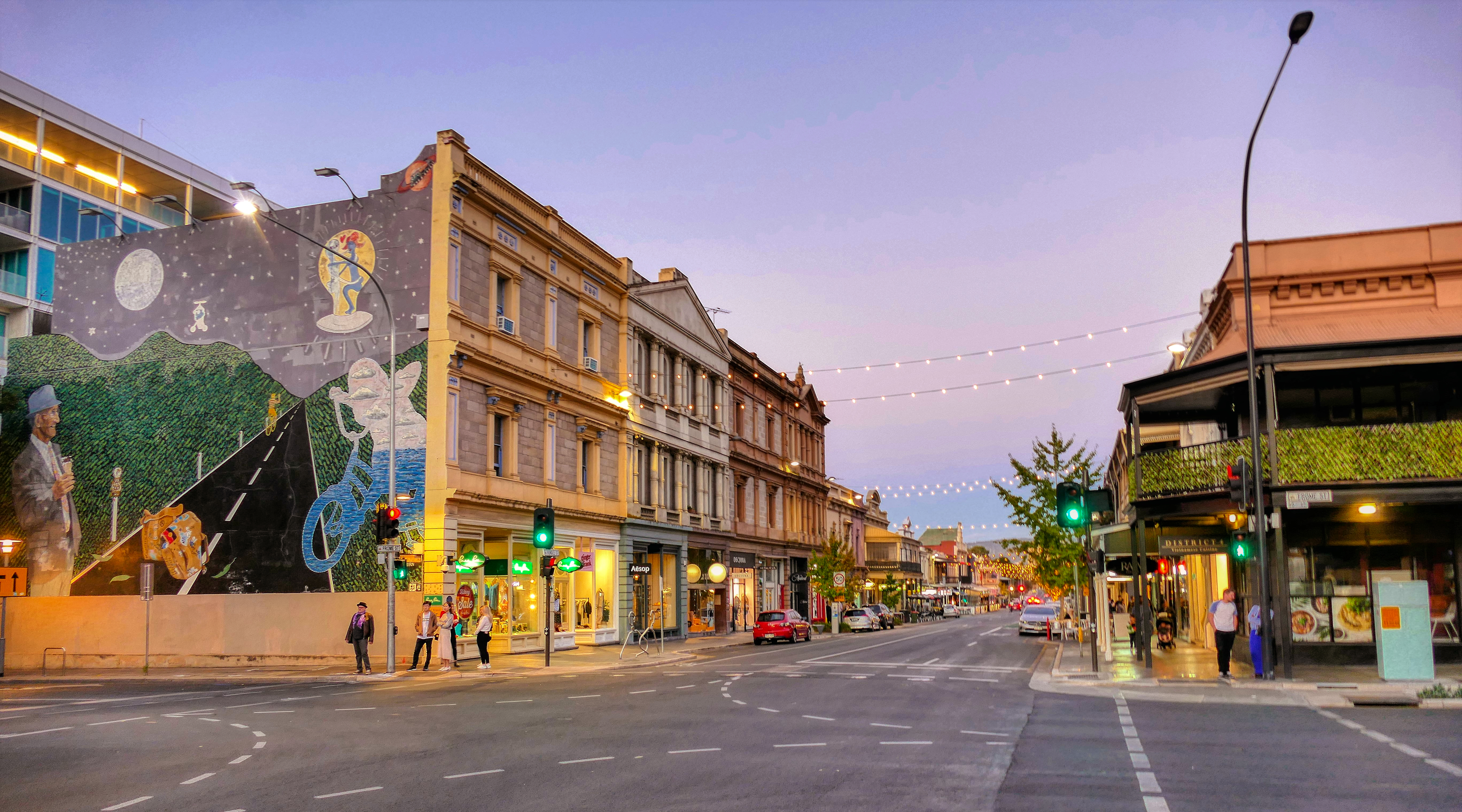
Mural (left) on a building, corner of Rundle and Frome Road in the Adelaide central business district

Street art in Adelaide is a growing aspect of the wider public arts scene found in the Adelaide central business district. Adelaide street art includes the full gamut of contemporary street art mediums, including stenciling, murals, paste-ups, sticker art and yarn bombing.

Whereas Adelaide street art was previously painted over on occasion by the local authorities, street art in Adelaide is now recognised and cultivated by state and local governments through supportive policies, as well as events such as the Oi You! Urban Art Festival.

== Street art locations ==
Adelaide's street art scene is physically centred in the Adelaide central business district, though it can be found in the suburbs. Stencils and other forms of street art such as yarn bombing also appears throughout suburbia and along public transport routes.

Major locations for street art in the city include lane ways off of Rundle Street, Hindley Street, Ebenezer Place and under the Morphett Street Bridge. Access to the Topham Mall has been banned by the Adelaide City Council.

== See also ==
- Street art
- List of Australian street artists

Street artists from Adelaide:

- James Cochran (artist)
- Dlux (street artist)

Other Australian cities:

- Street art in Melbourne
- Newtown area graffiti and street art, Sydney
