= List of Australian street artists =

This is a list of Australian street artists.

Artist	Name	Media	Birthplace	Birthdate	Current location	Link
Anthony Lister	Lister, Anthony		Brisbane	1979	Sydney	anthonylister.com
Civilian	Civil, Tom	stencils			Melbourne	tomcivil.com
Dlux	Dodd, James		Adelaide	1977	Melbourne	james-dodd.com
E.L.K.	Cornish, Luke	stencils	Canberra	1979	Sydney	elkstencils.com
Facter	Andersen, Fletcher	graffiti/paint	Perth		Melbourne	irikanji.com
Fintan Magee	Magee, Fintan	graffiti/paint	Lismore	1985	Sydney	fintanmagee.com
James Cochran	Cochran, James	graffiti	England	1973	Adelaide	akajimmyc.com
Jisoe	Hughes, Justin	graffiti			Melbourne	
Meek		stencil/wheat paste/stickers	Melbourne	1978	Melbourne	
Mini Graff		stencils	New Zealand	1974	Sydney	mingraff.com
Nurock	Fowler, Fred		Canberra	1980	Melbourne	fred-fowler.com
Phibs	De Haan, Tom	graffiti/paint	New South Wales	1974	Sydney	phibs.com
Reka One (REKA)	Reka, James	graffiti/paint	Melbourne		Berlin	rekaone.com
Rone	Wright, Tyrone	paint	Geelong	1980	Melbourne	r-o-n-e.com
Shida	Shida, Mik	graffiti/paint	Melbourne	1990	Łódź, Poland	mikshida.com
Stormie Mills	Mills, Stormie	graffiti/paint	Colwyn Bay, Wales	1969	Perth	stormiemills.com
Vexta	Bacina, Yvette		Melbourne		Brooklyn	vexta.com.au
INDO	INDO, Patrick	Stencils / Murals	Manly	1982	Crescent Head	https://indotheartist.com.au/ |
