= Phibs =

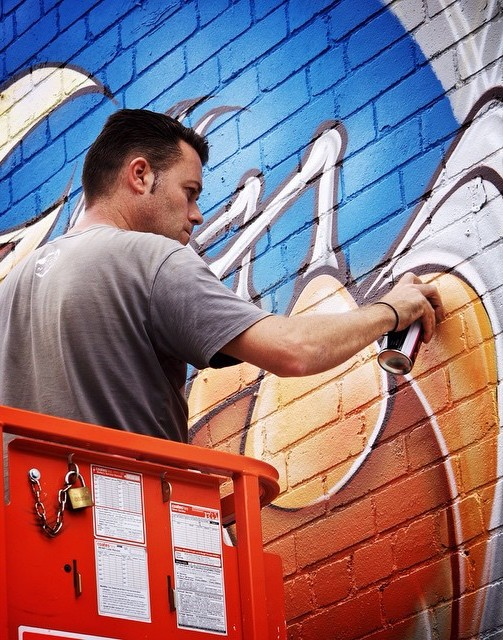
- Phibs at work in 2015
- Born: Tim De Haan; 1974 (age 51–52); Narooma, New South Wales, Australia
- Style: Street art
- Website: www.phibs.com

Phibs is the pseudonym of Tim De Haan (born 1974), a notable graffiti artist operating out of Sydney, Australia.

== Biography ==
Phibs was born in Narooma, New South Wales, Australia before moving to Sydney in the late 1980s and then Melbourne in 2001. Phibs has been commissioned to large scale artworks by companies such as Rip Curl and Absolut Vodka. He also has been commissioned to decorate a number of buildings across Sydney such as jivamukti yoga in Newtown, and a number of murals throughout the city of Sydney, Melbourne and Perth. He has also travelled to countries outside of Australia where his work can also be seen on walls in Amsterdam, Brooklyn, Miami and New York. Phibs is still a prominent member of the Fitzroy based Everfresh Studio Collective, alongside street artists Rone and Mike Makka.

Phibs was featured in the 2005 documentary, RASH, where he discusses his roots in graffiti art and paints murals with United States hip hop artist Chali 2na.

Phibs was also one of the Australian street artists featured in Jon Reiss' 2010 documentary webseries, Bomb It 2.

In September 2015 the premiere episode of Event, which aired on Foxtel Arts, featured Phibs as its Australian Artist in Residence.

A number of Phibs' print works have been acquired by the National Gallery of Australia for its permanent collection.

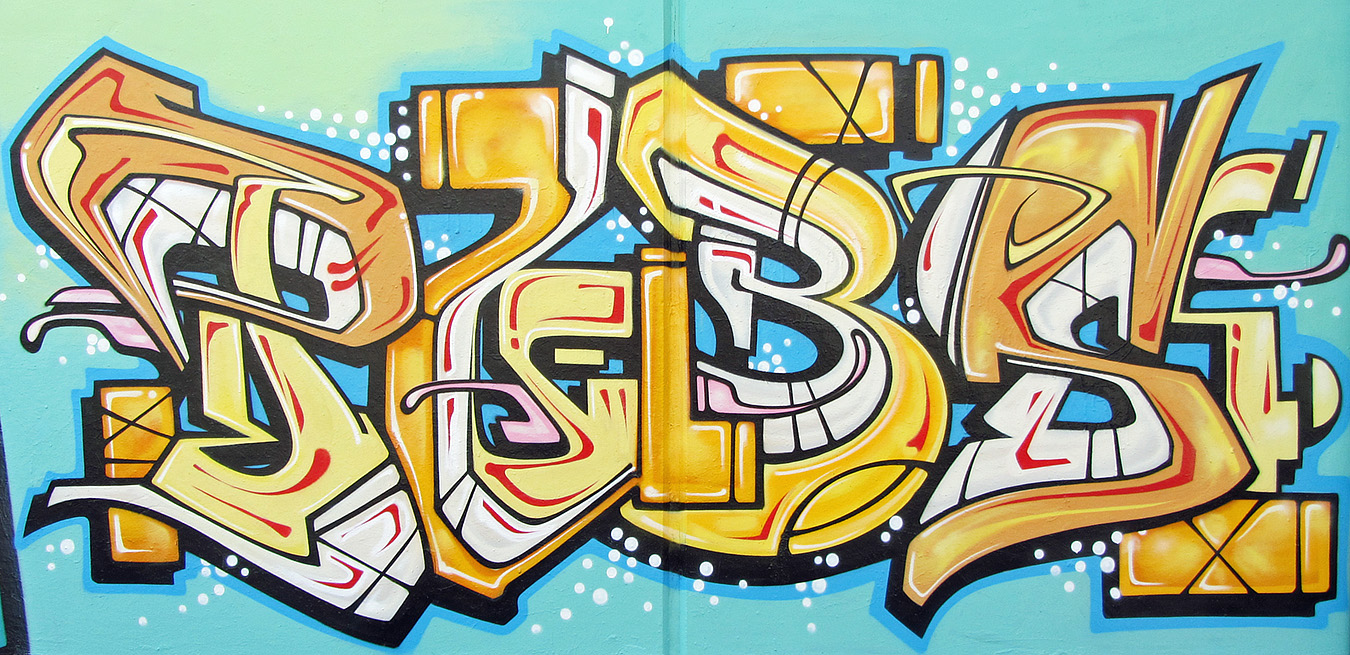
A Phibs piece in Marrickville

In recent years Phibs has been project managing and curating street art festivals. Most recently the Walk the Walls Festival in Caringbah (2018) and Cronulla (2019) with support from Sutherland Shire Council and Government of New South Wales.

Phibs is currently based in both Sydney and Melbourne.

== See also ==
- List of Australian street artists
- Types of graffiti
- List of graffiti artists
- RASH Documentary Melbourne, 2005
- Spray paint art
