= Homo Riot =

Street artist

- Born: Late-20th century Milton, Florida, United States
- Movement: Street art
- Website: Homo Riot on Instagram

Homo Riot is an anonymous queer street artist based in Los Angeles, California specializing in spray paint art, stencil graffiti, sticker art, and wheat-paste murals.

== Biography ==
Homo Riot was born and raised in Milton, Florida, where he first experimented with street art. He moved to Los Angeles, California in 2000 and is employed at a retail company as a fashion stylist and director. He has a degree in fine arts and owns a studio in Los Angeles. He is a gallery artist, performance artist, muralist, photographer, collagist, sculptor, and street artist. In 2008, with the passage of Proposition 8 in the state of California, Homo Riot was inspired to create art that conveyed unapologetic queerness on the streets of Los Angeles, and his name reflects his response to the then-ban on same-sex marriage. He prefers to remain anonymous as a street artist.

== Notable art ==
Homo Riot's public art murals often feature his signature symbol of two bearded men in masks kissing. His public work can be found on utility boxes, construction sites, abandoned buildings, and other public areas. His self-titled exhibition, "HOMO RIOT," at the Bert Green Fine Art gallery in Chicago featured this motif throughout his installations. Homo Riot's public works often depict vintage gay pornography, images of people at pride parades, women and men wearing leather, drag performances, sexually explicit imagery, and more.

In June 2019, in celebration of the 50th anniversary of the Stonewall uprisings of 1969, Homo Riot collaborated with queer street artist Suriani and photographer, film maker, and social activist The Dusty Rebel to create a mural depicting Marsha P. Johnson, a gay liberation activist and prominent figure in the Stonewall uprisings. The mural is located at 2nd Avenue and Houston Street in New York City and has been a target of vandalism.

In November 2019, Homo Riot participated in a street art exhibition titled "The Streets are Queer," which featured the work of queer North American street artists and was located at 9127 East 5th Street in downtown Los Angeles. His public work depicted queer representation of BDSM subcultures such as the leather subculture.
