= Eddie Martin =

Eddie Martin may refer to:

- Kwasi Jones Martin, English musician, songwriter and producer, also known as Eddie Martin
- Eddie Martin (boxer) (1903–1968), American bantamweight boxer
- Eddie Martin (blues musician) (1965-) English blues singer and guitarist, harmonica player, and drummer
- Eddie Martin, an Australian documentary filmmaker, director of Jisoe and others films.
