= List of sporting street art in Australia =

Australian athletes have increasingly been painted by street artists since 2000. This artwork is often in prominent locations and celebrates athlete achievements, sporting competitions and events and societal issues. The artworks are often commissioned by sports organisations or sponsors.

Street art is often not permanent and many of the artworks in this list many no longer exist at the location specified.

Athletes or Sport Description	Sport	Date	City	Comments
Cathy Freeman	Athletics	2016	Townsville, Queensland	Located at Angus Smith Sportspower building in Ogden Street. Artists were Shane Keen and John Bradshaw. Freeman from Palm Island won the gold medal in the women's 400 metres at the 2000 Summer Olympics.
Peter Norman, Tommie Smith and John Carlos	Athletics	2000	Sydney, New South Wales	Three Proud People, located on the side of a terrace at 39 Pine Street, Newtown. It represents the 1968 Olympics Black Power salute in Mexìco. By artist Donald Urquhart.
Peter Norman, Tommie Smith and John Carlos	Athletics		Melbourne, Victoria	Located in Kipling Street, Cremorne. By artist Hesco. It represents the 1968 Olympics Black Power salute in Mexìco. Norman was a track sprinter from Melbourne.
Percy Hobson	Athletics	2021	Bourke, New South Wales	Silo by John Murray that recognises Hobson, an Gundabooka man, who was born and lived in Bourke. He won the men's high jump at the 1962 British Empire and Commonwealth Games, Perth, Western Australia.
Female football supporters	Australian football	2015	Melbourne, Victoria	Titled 'Edge of your seat' located on wall M Docklands, La Trobe Street, opposite Docklands Stadium.By street artist Rone and commissioned by property development group Capital Alliance. Faces of two young women engrossed in a football game.
Adam Goodes	Australian football	2020	Sydney, New South Wales	Located at the corner of Foveaux and Crown Streets, Surry Hills. It was painted by Hamish McBride, Laura Paige, Megan Hales, Jacqueline Butterworth and Kailin Hegel from advertising agency and art studio Apparition Media. Goodes was the victim of racial abuse during his AFL career.
Lance 'Buddy' Franklin	Australian football	2018	Sydney, New South Wales	Located on Flinders Street, Darlinghurst. The artwork was painted by Apparition Media to promote 2018 Sir Doug Nicholls round.
Lance 'Buddy' Franklin	Australian football	2022	Melbourne, Victoria	Located on corner Poet Street and North Street, East Bentleigh by Jarrod Grech.
Dustin Martin	Australian football	2017	Melbourne, Victoria	Located Rowena Corner Store, 44 Rowena Parade, Richmond. A collaboration between artists Danny Awes, and Dvate, and was all brought together by the Richmond Football Club with sponsor Puma. It celebrated Martin's 2017 Brownlow Medal.
Eliza Hynes, Erica Fowler, Sarah D'Arcy and Ashleigh Brazill	Australian football	2019	Melbourne, Victoria	Located on corner of Smith and Sackville Street, Collingwood. Commissioned by CGU Insurance to promoting AFL Women's competition.
Kevin Murray and Jonathan Brown	Australian football	2021	Melbourne, Victoria	Located at Royal Derby Hotel, corner of Alexandra Parade and Brunswick Street, Fitzroy. By artist Damien Arena. Club icons of Fitzroy Lions / Brisbane Lions
Eddie Betts	Australian football	2021	Melbourne, Victoria	Located on corner of Mcilwraith and Park Streets, Princes Hill. Betts a significant indigenous AFL player was subjected to racism during his career with Carlton Football Club and Adelaide Football Club.
Josh Kennedy	Australian football	2018	Perth, Western Australia	Located at 11/633 Newcastle St, Leederville. By Perth street artists, Shakey and ArtbyDestroy. Kennedy was West Coast Eagles premiership player in 2018.
Travis Boak	Australian football	2021	Adelaide, South Australia	Located on corner of Mundy St and Nile St, Port Adelaide. By artists Vans the Omega & Morris Green and commissioned by Red Bull. Recognition of Boak's 300 games for Port Adelaide Football Club.
Josh Kennedy	Australian football	2023	Sydney, New South Wales	Located at 150 Foveaux St, Surry Hills. By Apparition Media. Kennedy was Sydney Swans captain from 2017 to 2021 and premiership player in 2012.
Sam Draper	Australian football	2023	Melbourne, Victoria	Located at Windy Hill, Essendon. Recognition of Essendon Football Club's Draper winning the AFL Goal of the Year.
Neale Daniher	Australian football	2023	Melbourne, Victoria	Located at Turners Alley, located between Bourke and Little Bourke streets by Vincent Fantauzzi. Mural recognises Daniher's fight against motor neurone disease and the research charity Fight MND.
Nick Daicos	Australian football	2024	Melbourne, Victoria	Collingwood premiership player Nick Daicos by Jarrod Grech. Located in Hosier Lane, Melbourne.
AFLW players - Abbie McKay, Ally Anderson and Libby Birch	Australian football	2023	Melbourne, Victoria	Located Rose Street, Fitzroy.Promoting the 2023 AFL Women's season.
Tarryn Thomas	Australian football	2020	Melbourne, Victoria	Located at Our Community House, Victoria St, North Melbourne. The mural featured the words ‘Treaty’ and ‘Respect, a statement in support for Black Lives Matter. It was removed in 2023 after Indigenous Voice to Parliament referendum was lost.
Nick Daicos	Australian football	2024	Melbourne, Victoria	Collingwood premiership player Nick Daicos by Jarrod Grech. Located in Hosier Lane, Melbourne.
Scott Pendlebury	Australian football	2026	Melbourne, Victoria	Recognition on Pendelbury breaking Brent Harvey's all-time VFL/AFL games rd of 432, with his record-breaking 433rd game on 23 May 2026 by Jarrod Grech.Located in Kulinbulok Lane, near the Queen Victoria Market.
Ben Simmons, Liz Cambage, Andrew Bogut, Lauren Jackson and Andrew Gaze	Basketball	2019	Melbourne, Victoria	Located at Docklands Stadium. By graffiti artist Sofles after being commissioned by Visit Victoria and Basketball Australia.
Marianna Tolo	Basketball	2021	Canberra, Australian Capital Territory	Located in the car park of the Canberra Centre by Queensland artist MattyBro.
Patrick Mills	Basketball	2021	Melbourne, Victoria	Located in Canning Street, Carlton. Celebrating Mills leading the Boomers to the bronze medal at the 2021 Summer Olympics. By artist Jarrod Grech.
Lauren Jackson; Andrew Gaze	Basketball	2025	Melbourne, Victoria	Mural commissioned by National Basketball League to celebrate two of Australia's greatest basketballers. Located in laneway off Stephenson St. Richmond. Can be viewed on railway line between Richmond and South Yarra.
Natalie Cook and Kerri Pottharst	Beach volleyball	2020	Sydney, New South Wales	Located at Bondi Beach. Celebrates Cook's and Pottharst's gold medal in beach volleyball at the 2000 Summer Olympics held at Bondi Beach.
Caroline Buchanan	BMX	2021	Canberra, Australian Capital Territory	Located in Garema Place. By students from her old school, Erindale College, with the guidance of local artist Bohie Palecek. Buchanan represented Australia at the Olympics.
Ellyse and Katy Perry	Cricket	2020	Melbourne, Victoria	Located in Hosier Lane by local artist Tayla Broekman as part of the 2020 ICC Women's T20 World Cup Tour.
Shane Warne	Cricket	2017	Melbourne, Victoria	Located at 144 Chapel Street, St Kilda. By Lushsux. It originally had Warne drinking a glass of beer but was changed to him drinking milk as a primary school playground looked straight onto the mural.
Shane Warne	Cricket	2022	Perth, Western Australia	Located behind No Mafia restaurant in Northbridge. By artists Aidan Garnett and Caitlin Aguss. Painted after his sudden death.
Shane Warne	Cricket	2022	Melbourne, Victoria	Located laneway next to 606 Balcombe Road, Black Rock. By Melbourne's Murals and Interior Design. Painted after his sudden death and where Warne.
Shane Warne	Cricket	2022	Sydney, New South Wales	County Avenue, the side of the Paddington RSL, about one kilometre from the Sydney Cricket Ground. By Bathurst artist Callum Hotham and 3m mural portrays Warne gazing into the distance.
Mitchell Marsh; Cameron Green	Cricket	2023	Perth, Western Australia	Located in Newcastle St, West Perth by artist Michael Betts to promote Perth Test Match which included Western Australian players Marsh and Green.
Mile Jedinak	Football	2018	Melbourne, Victoria	Located at corner Johnston and Chapel Streets, Fitzroy. By street artist Scott Marsh. Commissioned by SportsBet to promote the 2018 World Cup.
Michelle Heyman	Football	2021	Canberra, Australian Capital Territory	Located at 16 Bunda Street by artist Megan Hales. Mural part of a series around Australia celebrating a few of Australia's high LGBTQ+ creators.
Sam Kerr	Football	2021	Fremantle, Western Australia	Located Norfolk Street by artist Fieldey.
Jamie Maclaren	Football	2023	Melbourne, Victoria	Located at Richmond Railway Station by Hannah Wilkinson, Melbourne City player. Recognition of Maclaren becoming the A-League greatest goal scorer.
Ange Postecoglou	Football	2022	Melbourne, Victoria	Located on Coventry Street, South Melbourne by Shaun Dev. Recognising Postecoglou's achievements as Manager of Celtic F.C. .
Sam Kerr	Football	2023	Sydney, New South Wales	Located Haversham Lane, Marrickville by UK-born artist Stuart Sale, sits among John Lennon, Kylie Minogue, Cristiano Ronaldo and dozens of other celebrities. Celebrating the Matildas 2023 FIFA Women's World Cup campaign in Australia
Matildas	Football	2023	Sydney, New South Wales	Located on Bondi Beach sea wall painted by Danielle Weber and designed Ryan Ostle. Celebrating the Matildas 2023 FIFA Women's World Cup campaign in Australia. Includes players Sam Kerr, Steph Catley, Clare Polkinghorne, Lydia Williams, Caitlin Foord, Katrina Gorry, Charli Grant, and Emily van Egmond.
Ange Postecoglou	Football	2023	Melbourne, Victoria	Located in Hosier Lane.Six larger than life depictions showcase the various stages and achievements in the career of the Greek-Australian football manager. Project was conceived by Dean Drossos, Peter Giasoumi and Dean Kotsianis.
Caitlin Foord	Football	2024	Wollongong, New South Wales	Located in Wollongong Central. .Celebrating Matilas player Foord who grew up in Wollongong. By artist Claire Foxton.
Hugh Bowman and Winx	Horse racing	2020	Dunedoo, New South Wales	On silos and painted by Peter Mortimor with state government grant of $95,000.
Kate Moloney	Netball	2019	Melbourne, Victoria	Located at Turners Alley, just off Bourke Street Mall. Commissioned by the City of Melbourne as a partner of the Melbourne Vixens, and created by Blender Studios, the mural highlights Melbourne as a 'Vixens City'.
Nathan Hindmarsh	Rugby league	2016	Parramatta, New South Wales	Located in 110 Church St, Parramatta artist Stormie Mills. Hindmarsh a former Parramatta Eels captain.
Cameron Smith	Rugby League	2017	Melbourne, Victoria	Located in Hosier Lane. By Aaron McAviney to celebrate Smith's record breaking 356th NRL appearance.
Cameron Smith, Will Chambers and Allana Ferguson	Rugby league	2017	Darwin, Northern Territory	Located side of Roma Bar on Cavenagh Street. Collaboration led by well-known Darwin artist David Collins and Jesse Bell, featuring designs by Shaun Lee and East Arnhem Land's Gayili Marika Yunupingu. commissioned by the Northern Territory Government to celebrate the first international to be played in the Northern Territory as part of the 2017 Rugby League World Cup.
Cameron Smith	Rugby league	2019	Melbourne, Victoria	Located at Richmond railway station, Swan Street, Richmond. By artist Sid Tapia to celebrate Smith's 400th NRL Game.
Anthony Minichiello, Arthur Beetson, Brad Fittler and Boyd Cordner	Rugby league	2018	Sydney, New South Wales	Located at corner of Council and Birrell Streets in Waverley, New South Wales. By artist Sid Tapia. Celebrating Sydney Roosters legends before the 2018 NRL Grand Final.
Greg Inglis	Rugby League	2018	Sydney, New South Wales	Located at the corner of Cleveland and Woodburn Streets in Redfern. By artist Sid Tapia. Commemorates the role of Indigenous sports people in Australia.
Billy Slater	Rugby league	2018	Melbourne, Victoria	Located outside Richmond Railway Station by Sid Tapia. Honouring Slater's retirement.
Maggie Moloney	Rugby league	2022	Sydney, New South Wales	Located in James Street, Redfern, behind St Vincent de Paul Centre. By artist Sharon Billinge. Maloney is regarded as Australia's first female rugby league star, at only 15 years of age.
John Sutton	Rugby league	2018	Sydney, New South Wales	Located at Kensington Oval in Kensington and celebrated his achievement of 300 NRL games, first ever South Sydney Rabbitohs player to reach the 300 game milestone for the Club in its 110 years history.
Robbie Farah	Rugby league	2023	Sydney, New South Wales	Located Sackville Hotel in Rozelle, Sydney by Sid Tapia.
Paul Gallen; Andrew Ettingshausen	Rugby league	2024	Located outside Endeavour Field (PointsBet Stadium) Cronulla. Replicated the famous 'Up Up Cronulla' painting that stood proudly on a local shop wall from 2018 where Gallen and Ettingshausen embraced after Cronulla's first NRL premiersip. By artist Sid Tapia.	
Israel Folau	Rugby union	2019	Sydney, New South Wales	Located at Botany View Hotel, King Street, Newtown. By artist Scott Marsh. The mural depicts Folau sitting in front of a yellow Lamborghini begging for money, proffering a sign that reads: "The righteous shall taketh from the punters for the divinity of ones [sic] property portfolio.
Evonne Goolagong Cawley	Tennis	2007	Brisbane, Queensland	Tennyson Memorial & Curzon St, Tennyson, Queensland.By Jo Murphy and part of Artforce is an initiative of Brisbane City Council managed by Urban Smart Projects.
Ashleigh Barty and Sam Stosur	Tennis	2019	Brisbane, Queensland	Located at Queensland Tennis Centre. By graffiti artist Drapl. Barty and Stosur from Queensland are grand slam singles winners.
Ashleigh Barty and Evonne Goolagong Cawley	Tennis	2019	Darwin, Northern Territory	Located at Darwin International Tennis Centre. The artwork, curated by David Collins was painted by Larrakia man Shaun Lee 'Hafleg' and portrait artist Jesse Bell, as a celebration of Goolagong Cawley and Barty, the only two Australian women to achieve the world No.1 singles ranking in the modern era.
Ashleigh Barty and Evonne Goolagong Cawley	Tennis	2023	Adelaide, South Australia.	Located at Playford Tennis Centre, Elizabeth East. Painted by indigenous artists Thomas Readett and Shane Cook.The Playford Tennis Centre hosts the National Indigenous Tennis Carnival.
Pat Cash	Tennis	2014	Melbourne, Victoria	By graffiti artist Daniel Wenn during the ellesse Tennis Performance Apparel Launch on 17 January 2014.
Dylan Alcott	Tennis	2020	Melbourne, Victoria	Located in Richmond by Connor McLennan. Part of Nike's partnership with the Australian Open.
Dylan Alcott	Tennis	2022	Melbourne, Victoria	Located outside Le Bon Ton, Gipps Street, Collingwood by Gadigal Street artist Jesse Wright to celebrate Alcott's retirement.
