= Shida (artist) =

Australian multidisciplinary artist (born 1990)

Mik Shida
- Born: 1990 (age 35–36); Melbourne, Victoria, Australia
- Known for: Street art Painting
- Style: Street art
- Website: www.mikshida.com

Shida (born 1990) is an Australian multidisciplinary artist best known for his large scale mural work. Shida's practice encompasses video, publishing, public works and murals.

"Shida explores the relationship between Ritual, Sexuality and Love. Psychedelic entities are entwined in a ceremonial act transcending the bounds of known reality. In a world where society’s issues are becoming increasingly gendered and people are seemingly more divided than ever due to the rise of identity politics. Shida seeks to turn this tide like an ancient shaman with each works being in essence an invocation, an energetic manifestation, a prayer to joy."

Shida has been involved in street art since 2004 with early work of his featured in RASH a documentary covering Melbourne's burgeoning street art scene. "Shida has created his work across more than 35 cities, in over 20 countries. The great majority of his work is created pro bono for the neighbourhoods and communities that he visits on his travels and across Australia. His work reflects his multicultural upbringing. It is naturally Australian while at the same time being influenced by a plethora of different cultures arts as well as his own polish cultural heritage"

== Exhibitions ==
2006 Shida 1, Cylinder Gallery, Brisbane

2008 Shida 2, Cylinder Gallery, Brisbane

2009 Fate's Fantasy, Inoperable Gallery, Vienna

2009 Crystals of the Colossus, Cylinder Gallery, Brisbane

2011 Nec Spe Nec Metu, Nine Lives Gallery, Brisbane

2011 Crystals of the Colossus, Until Never Gallery, Melbourne

2011 Finding Paradise, Comb Gallery, Gold Coast, Queensland

2012 Crystals of the Colossus, Inoperable Gallery, Vienna

2013 Spirits, Blake House Gallery, Brisbane

2013 Ecstasy in the Abyss, Backwoods Gallery, Melbourne

2013 Higher Planes, Tate Gallery, Sydney

2014 Inner Myths, Backwoods Gallery, Melbourne

2014 Mythographies, Brisbane Powerhouse, Brisbane

2016 Summoning Lovers out of time, Backwoods Gallery, Melbourne

2016 Rites of Joy, TMBTP, Brisbane

2016 New Meaning, Besser Space, Melbourne

2018 A Conduit Order, Urban Spree, Berlin

== See also ==
- Street art in Melbourne
- Street art
- Graffiti
- List of Australian street artists
- Lanes and arcades of Melbourne
- RASH (2005 documentary film)
