= True Live =

Australian band

- Origin: Melbourne, Australia
- Genres: Rock, Soul, Post-rock, Hip hop, Jazz, Pop
- Years active: 2003–present
- Labels: Shock Records 2005, Illusive Sounds 2007
- Members: Ryan Ritchie; Tamil Rogeon; Thai Matus; Tim Blake; Ivan Khatchoyan; Thomas Butt; Alex Yeap; James Bowers; Marco Cascarino
- Website: www.true-live.com

True Live was an Australian band that was formed in Melbourne, Australia. The group had mild chart success with "TV" reaching #76 on the ARIA Single Chart and The Shape of It reaching #85 on the ARIA Albums Chart. The band received regular play on radio and television and were chosen to perform at the 2006 Commonwealth Games. The group's early recordings contained strong ties to hip hop but since 2011 have made a significant turn toward rock and classical leanings.

== History ==
True Live was formed in 2003, consisting of 6 diverse musicians. Under the leadership of Ryan Ritchie, the band began to play gigs around Melbourne, including regular performances at The Evelyn and Revolver. During this time, the group established its style, including a complete string section.

In 2005, True Live signed with Shock Records and released its debut release, Mintons EP. The album was critically acclaimed, and received extensive play on Triple J, the video clip being played regularly on Rage, Channel V and Video Hits. Subsequent songs from the record, such as 'Bounce', received similar coverage. During the 2005–2006 period, the band toured, performing at the Meredith Music Festival, the Bangalow Jazz Festival and Big Day Out, among others, performing with acts such as Moby, Roots Manuva and De La Soul. In October 2006, the band released its second release "The Shape of It", the lead single 'TV' being played on various commercial stations across Australia, including Nova and The Edge and its accompanying video clip appearing on major music programs.

In 2005, Ryan Ritchie and True Live created the musical soundtrack for RASH, the first feature-length documentary in Australia to focus on the new art form of street art.

In early 2007, True Live received four stars in Rolling Stone Magazine for their album and successfully sold out tours across Australia. In 2007, 'TV' was used as the music in the Fox Sports advertisements and in 2008 'Let Out' was included in the TV mini series 'Underbelly'. In May 2008, True Live released 'The Shape of It' in Japan.

The band has now released its 2nd album 'Found Lost'. In early 2009 True Live signed to Melbourne record label Illusive Sounds who are also the home of Bliss N Eso & Paris Wells. 'Found Lost' though critically successful, was a sales disaster in Australia, however the single 'Something To Be' received attention in France on both Radio and Television and the album was released and sold well in France and Switzerland, in 2011 the group Signed to Sakifo Records out of Orleans France, and were set to release their 3rd album through Europe in 2014.

Ryan Ritchie and Tamil Rogeon have released two albums with the RAah Project.

== Touring ==
True Live have supported international touring artists such as DJ Shadow, The Roots, De La Soul, Roots Manuva, Moby and Ozomatli on Australia-wide tours, and have been a successful part of a number of festivals, including:

- The Big Day Out – (V Stage) Melbourne 2005
- Pyramid Rock – Main Stage, Phillip Island 2004, 2006, 2007
- Darling Harbour Jazz Festival - 2007
- Meredith Music Festival – 2004, 2005
- We Love Sounds Festival – Opening for DJ Shadow Brisbane 2007
- Woodford Folk Festival – Main Stage 2005/2006, 2008/2009
- MS Fest '06 – Launceston 2006
- Make Poverty History – Geelong/Perth 2007
- Southbound - Busselton 2006
- The Falls Festival –Marion Bay, Lorne 2005/2006
- The Feelgood Festival – Luna Park, Sydney 2006
- The Great Escape – Sydney 2006, 2007
- The Commonwealth Games – Melbourne 2006
- Groovin' The Moo – Maitland, Albury, Darwin 2006, 2007
- The West Coast Blues and Roots Festival – Fremantle 2007
- East Coast Blues and Roots Festival - 2008
- Kiss My Grass Festival – Melbourne 2007
- Rip Curl Pro World Championship Tour – 2005, 2006
- St Kilda Festival – 2004, 2005, 2008
- BBQ Breaks – Brisbane 2007
- Sound Safari - Melbourne - 2010
- Musiques en stock - Cluses - 2011
- Sakifo Music Festival - Reunion - 2010
- Festival de La Cité at Lausanne - Switzerland - 2011
- Fun Festival - Beijing - 2012

== Music ==
True Live combines classical jazz, soul, hip hop and dance music. The group incorporates violin, keyboard, cello, drums and double bass in live performances.

== Discography ==
=== Albums ===
List of albums, with selected details and chart positions
Title	Details	Peak chart positions
Title	Details	AUS
The Shape of It	Released: 2006; Label: Illusive Sounds, Shock; Format: CD	85
Found Lost	Released: 2009; Label: Illusive Sounds; Format: CD	

=== Singles ===
List of singles, with selected chart positions
Title	Year	Peak chart positions	Album
Title	Year	AUS	Album
"TV"	2006	76	The Shape of It
"Something to be"	2010		Found Lost
