= Vexta =

Australian stencil and street artist

- Known for: Stencil artist and street artist
- Website: vexta.com.au

Vexta is an Australian stencil artist and street artist from Sydney, Australia.

== Career ==
Beginning her career as an artist predominately working on the streets of Melbourne and Sydney, New South Wales, Vexta is now considered to be one of Australia's most popular and renowned Australian artists working within both urban environments and gallery spaces. Much of her work surrounds the concepts of death, rebirth and the duality of the sexes (an area which she has much to comment on as one of the few famous female street artists in operation), can be seen on walls and galleries all over Australia, America, London, mainland Europe, Mexico and South America, and most recently the Contemporary Art Biennale of India. Vexta has been called "one of Australia's few female stencil artists to have achieved wide recognition" by Lois Stavsky, author of the seminal Graffiti 365 art book.

Vexta moved from Sydney to Melbourne in the mid-2000s. In Melbourne, she became involved in the local stencil art scene, alongside artists including Dlux, Optic, Sync, and Ha-Ha, she began cutting and spraying her own stencils. She began producing her own stencil work during this period. Her art often features figures with feathered wings and kissing skeletons.

Her work has been purchased by the National Gallery of Australia and was prominently featured in the gallery's first-ever street and stencil art exhibition, "Space Invaders", which toured Australian art institutions for two years. She has also completed large-scale commissioned pieces on walls around the world internationally, been included in dozens of group shows.

== Work ==
Vexta's motivation for stencil art is both artistic and socio-political. She has been documented as saying:

"As an artist you take whatever it is you have around you to construct this thing that's important but perhaps can't be expressed in language. My paintings examine these intangible aspects of our lives such as dreams and transient states; the world around us and our place in it."

Her main aim in her work is to connect with the public on an emotional level:

"I want to find and capture what it is that makes us human, the soul of the individual that is at once personal but at the same time deeply universal."

Vexta has an interest in creating geometric triangle shapes which she has likened to subatomic particles that make up all matter. She likes to leave a small amount of blank space in her street art, so the viewer can apply their own viewpoint to the work of art. She creates works of art through a psychedelic lens often juxtaposing humans and animals exploring themes of life/death, physics, cosmology and the feminine culture.

Vexta was featured in the documentary film Rash (2005), which explores the cultural value of street art in Melbourne. She was also featured in the film Exit Through The Gift Shop (2010).

== Shows and exhibits ==
Vexta was one of the few street artists around the world to be personally invited by Banksy, the world's most infamous street artist, to participate in the "Cans Festival", an all-stencil underground event that also featured the likes of Blek le Rat, Vhils, Faile and Pure Evil.

Internationally, Vexta was one of twelve Australian artists to be chosen to exhibit as part of Young & Free, the largest-ever Australian street art exhibition outside of Australia. This took place in September 2011 at White Walls Gallery in San Francisco, California, where it was a critical and commercial success.

She participated in "The "F" Word: Feminism in Art" show which took place at the Untitled Space in New York City between 21 October 2015 and 28 October 2015. The event was created to celebrate the GirlPower issue of Untitled magazine and is part of a "Women in Art" series taking place at the gallery.

== See also ==
- List of 20th-century women artists
- List of Australian artists
- List of people from Melbourne
- List of Australian street artists
