= Meek (street artist) =

Australian street artist

Meek (born 1978, Melbourne, Australia) is a notable street artist operating out of Melbourne, Australia, and specialising in the subgenre of stencil graffiti.

Meek began putting up street art in early 2003, and enjoys the irony of his name in a subject area that is all about bragging and boasting.

He lived in London for some time and was exposed to the work of Banksy. As well as stenciling prolifically, Meek has also hijacked billboards, and used wheat paste and stickers.

The book Stencil Graffiti Capital devotes a chapter to Meek. Other books that display his works are Stencil Pirates by Josh McPhee, Conform by Saskia Folk and Street art uncut by Matthew Lunn. Meek also appears in feature documentary RASH 2005, a film which explores the cultural value of street art in Melbourne, Australia.

His work has been exhibited in:

- Melbourne Stencil Festival, 2005
- BACKWOODS – An Exhibition of the EVERFRESH STUDIOS, Wooden Shadow Gallery, Richmond (VIC), 21 April 2007
- National Gallery of Art, Canberra, Australia

== See also ==
- List of Australian street artists
- Types of graffiti
- Spray paint art
