= Facter =

Australian artist

- Born: Fletcher Anderson; March 15, 1975 (age 51); Perth, Western Australia, Australia
- Education: Self-taught
- Known for: Street art, designer toys, publishing, writing
- Movement: Urban art, street art, lowbrow
- Website: http://www.invurt.com/

Facter, or Fletcher Anderson, is a Melbourne based, Australian multi-disciplinary artist, best known for his colorful creatures rendered in an illustrative style.

His work has been featured in several publications, His practice encompasses street art (murals, paste-ups and stickers), designer toys, painting, illustration, publishing, and writing. His work can also be found internationally, having painted murals in Australia, USA, Mexico, Taiwan, Guatemala, Norway, Poland, Latvia, Hungary, Indonesia, Singapore, and Malaysia.

== Biography ==
=== Early life ===
Facter was born in Perth, Western Australia. He began his involvement in street art in 1990, initially engaging in graffiti. Over time, he expanded his practice to include various forms of visual art and design.

=== Career ===
Under the Invurt banner, Facter has been responsible for the production of a wide range of large-scale paintings productions in Melbourne, Australia. In 2013, alongside Land Of Sunshine and Just Another Agency and the National Gallery of Victoria produced 'All Your Walls', a large-scale repainting of the entirety of Hosier Lane involving over 150 artists including him. From 2012 - 2014 Facter curated over 100 artists in the creation of Artist Lane in the City of Stonnington, under the Aerosol Alley events banner. He assisted in the production of the 2016 graffiti event “Meeting Of Styles Melbourne”, also under the Invurt banner. Facter was the chief curator, alongside Dean Sunshine, David Russell and Luke McManus for the Melbourne publication of the Google Street Art art project.

Facter was the co-editor with Jo Jette for the short-lived print publication Damnit! magazine. Facter also worked as a freelance writer for X-Press Magazine, Knowledge Magazine, and Drum magazine, for which he wrote hundreds of articles and interviews on electronic music artists.

Alongside his art he has been featured in several documentaries and TV shows on street art in Australia. In 2016, Facter started the designer toy label Irikanji, based on his work as an artist. The creatures within the Irikanji urban vinyl line inhabit a realm called The Known. Alongside his visual art practice, Facter is the creator, editor and chief writer for the Invurt.com website. Invurt maintains news of exhibitions and events, interviews and photography of street art across Australia, New Zealand and South East Asia.

== Recognition ==
Facter is noted for his advocacy of street art and graffiti in Australia, he has written articles on street art in Australia, as well as on issues of copyright. In 2012 he was involved in the overturning of a proposal to install CCTV cameras in Hosier Lane, and in the opening of the lane way from a permit-based painting zone to one that allowed artists to paint without permission.
