= Lushsux =

Anonymous Australian graffiti artist

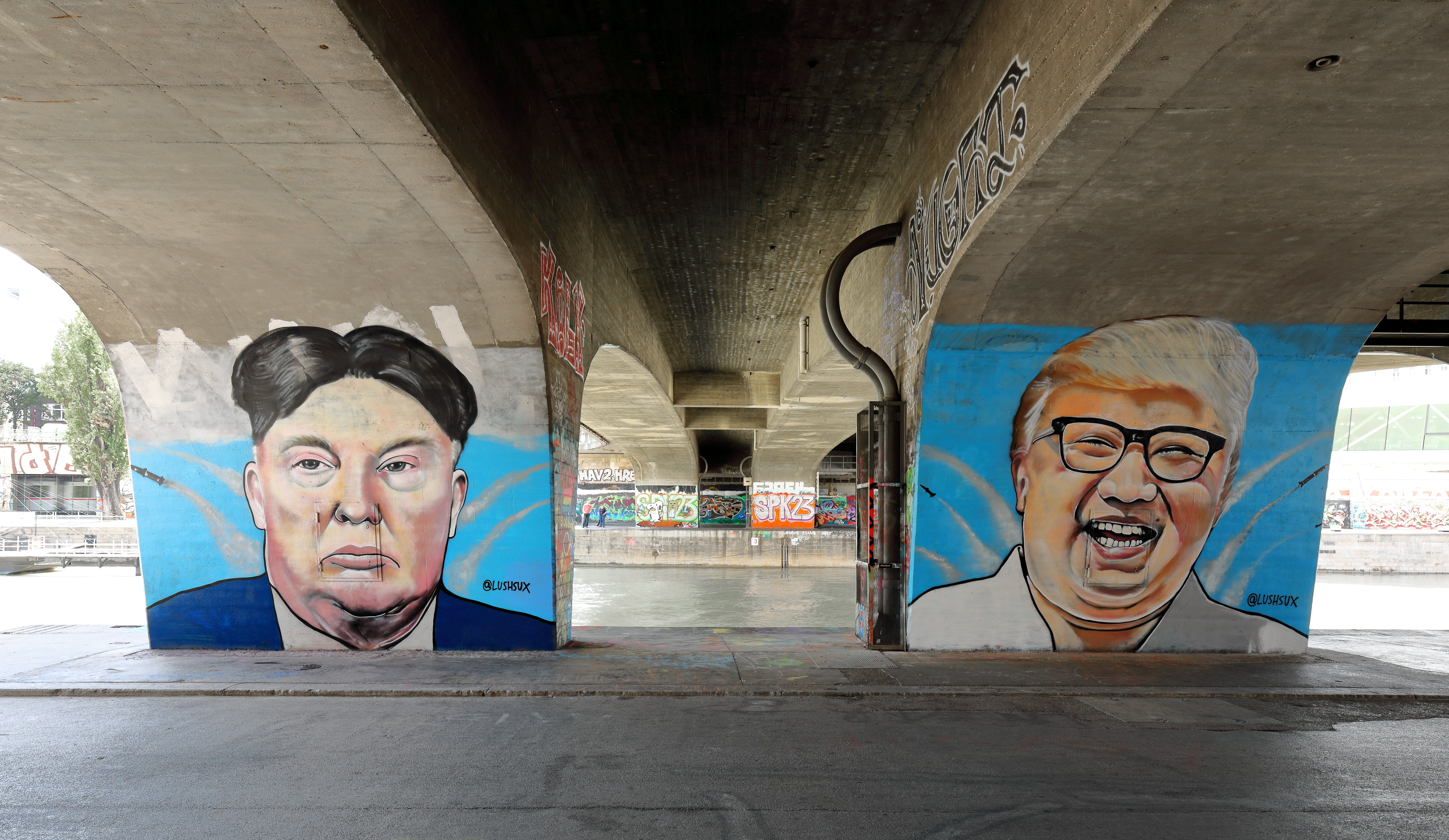
A mural with Kim Jong Un and Donald Trump in Vienna

Lushsux is an anonymous Australian street artist whose works have received international coverage. Based in Melbourne, he is best known for his large murals that draw on internet meme culture, as well as popular culture more broadly. He has been called "the prototypical post-Internet artist" and "Australia's answer to Banksy".

== Biography ==
Lushsux stated that he grew up in a working-class family in the western suburbs of Melbourne, and worked in a factory before becoming a full-time artist. Since his first gallery show in Collingwood in 2010, Lushsux has been supported by Sarah Powell and Andrew King, patrons of the Melbourne street art scene.

== NFTs ==
Lushsux has been selling NFTs of his artworks since 2021. His art has been auctioned in various platforms, including Nifty Gateway, SuperRare and MakersPlace. His art was exhibited at "DART2121" in Milan and at Art Basel 2021 in Miami, in collaboration with auction house Christie's.

== Controversies ==
In August 2016, he created a mural in Footscray of a skimpily-dressed Hillary Clinton. After the local council received complaints from members of the public, Lushsux painted a burqa over Clinton.

Special criticism has been made of Lushsux's interventions in the West Bank separation barrier in Bethlehem. His art in the wall has been criticized for trying to make fun of a serious issue, spreading many meme-like images and humorous scenes over the separation wall. In one controversial scene, he uses a Nelson Mandela quote in a mural depicting actor Morgan Freeman, which has been considered to potentially express the racist stereotype that Black people supposedly look the same. His painting of Donald Trump and Benjamin Netanyahu kissing has been accused of trying to use homophobic humor, while his representations of Jewish stereotypes have been considered antisemitic.

In September 2018 he angered 50 Cent with a mural of him. In October 2018 he parodied Kanye West and Donald Trump's friendship by creating the character "Donye West". In March 2019 he parodied Anderson "The Spider" Silva showing him dressed as Spider-Man.

In 2020, he started painting murals of 50 Cent again, creating multiple mashups that "reimagine" the rapper as another public figure, including Mike Tyson ("50 Thent"), Mike Pence ("50 Pence") and Taylor Swift ("Swifty Cent"). 50 Cent reposted many of the murals on his social media, expressing both admiration for the artist's skill, but also anger over being consistently targeted by him. In May 2020, Lushsux stated that he was hospitalised after being attacked by a group of men while painting another 50 Cent mural.
