= Rone =

Australian street artist

- Born: Tyrone Wright; 1980 (age 45–46); Geelong, Victoria, Australia
- Style: Street art
- Website: www.r-o-n-e.com

Tyrone Wright (born 1980), better known by his pseudonym Rone, is an Australian street artist based in Melbourne.

== History ==
Rone grew up in a rural location outside Geelong, Victoria, before moving to Melbourne in 2001. In 2002, he started decorating skateboards and skate parks before beginning to put paste-ups and stencils on walls around Melbourne. He creates "Jane Doe" images. In the earlier years of his career, Rone used to use wheat pasting to do quick paste-ups in busy locations, but later work on the streets are mostly created using traditional painting materials such as rollers and paintbrushes. Some of the locations he has painted include New York, San Francisco, Los Angeles, Miami, Paris, Berlin, London, Tokyo, Hong Kong, Santo Domingo, Mexico, Havana, Christchurch, and Port Vila.

Rone’s work is now in galleries. His work has been acquisitioned by institutions the National Gallery of Australia and the National Gallery of Victoria and has been shown by Stolen Space in London, Opera Gallery in New York, White Walls in San Francisco, Urban Nation in Berlin, and Backwoods Gallery in Melbourne. He has also worked on a Jean Paul Gaultier museum exhibit and is a brand ambassador for Uniqlo.

In February 2021, Rone received an arts grant from the Australian federal government for $1.86 million, one of the largest amounts awarded to a single artist in Australian history.

== Exhibitions ==
Since 2016, Rone has been creating immersive art installations in abandoned buildings. The first of these, EMPTY, took place in the old Star Lyric Theatre building in Fitzroy, Melbourne. Opened in 1911 and once seating 2,300 patrons, it was one of the first permanent movie theatres in Victoria. When Rone found out the building would soon be demolished, he asked to use the space for an art exhibition. 12,000 patrons came to the show over 10 days, and photographs featured in the show are now part of the National Gallery of Victoria's permanent collection.

In 2017, he was invited to transform the machine rooms of the old Alphington Paper Mill, which was built in the 1910s and was Victoria’s first paper mill. A clandestine project, Rone completed a series of murals inside the decrepit building in secret. Because of health and safety requirements, only a small group of people were able to view the works, which he called ALPHA; they also had to wear reflective vests and hard hats and be given a full safety induction on arrival. The building has since been demolished.

Later that year, Rone transformed a small weatherboard cottage into an immersive show called OMEGA. Part art exhibition, part installation, Omega was Rone’s first project that went beyond painting portraits in decaying buildings and created an immersive experience. He recreated the archetypal mid-century Australian interior landscape that the home’s former resident grew up in. In total, 8,000 people visited over 10 days, with an hours-long queue snaking down the chain-link fence that lined the block.

Based on the success of OMEGA, Rone was invited to turn the Burnham Beeches mansion in the Dandenong Ranges into a multi-storey art exhibit. Originally built in 1933, the mammoth structure had stood empty for a quarter century. The show, called EMPIRE, was a year in the making, with the team living on site through the change of the seasons. Then in March 2019, over the course of six weeks, more than 25,000 people travelled to see the show, which included fourteen giant murals based on the manor’s history.

In late 2020, Rone was a part of Melbourne's first so-called “artcade,” which was designed to bring people back into the city after COVID lockdowns. Along with other artists, including Adnate, Meggs, and Mayonaize, Rone was given access to several storefronts whose tenants had vacated during the previous year’s slump. Rone painted a depiction of Sleeping Beauty to represent a city finally waking up after a long slumber.

Nearly 15 years after leaving his hometown of Geelong, Rone was invited back to the city he littered in illegal stencils as a teen to have a solo exhibition at the Geelong Art Gallery, one of the largest regional galleries in Australia. In addition to turning their main wing into an immersive installation, it was also the first comprehensive survey of Rone’s career. A large room exhibited a retrospective of his work, charting his practice from early stencils and street art to photographs documenting all of his major installations. Nearly 50,000 people passed through over 80 days.

== See also ==
- List of Australian street artists
- Types of graffiti
- List of graffiti artists
- Spray paint art
