= Northcote Koori Mural =

Coordinates: 37.751979°S 144.995466°E

The Northcote Koori Mural is located in St Georges Road Thornbury, Victoria in the City of Darebin. It was designed by former Northcote High School art teacher Megan Evans in collaboration with members of the Thornbury-based Aborigines Advancement League, which owns the mural.

Evans worked with Aboriginal artist and elder Lin Onus researching and designing the mural in collaboration with members of the Victorian Aboriginal Community, and it was painted between 1983 and 1985, by trainee artists including Les Griggs, a Gunditjmara man (1962–93), Ray Thomas, Millie Yarran, Ian Johnson and Elaine Trott and many other volunteers.

The Northcote Koori Mural was originally located opposite the Northcote Town Hall on Council land in High Street. This site was later sold and the mural was moved to the Aboriginal Advancement League in St. Georges Road, Thornbury where a large, free-standing wall was erected specifically to accommodate the mural on the edge of the Sir Douglas Nicholls Sporting Complex. Megan Evans considered the artwork significant because “…it was a landmark for the Aboriginal community at that time and because Northcote Council was prepared to support a project which was politically ahead of its time".

In the late 1990s, the local council sold the land where the mural was situated and it was relocated to nearby St George's Road, Thornbury, close to the AAL's current location.

The mural was proposed for inclusion on the Darebin Heritage Overlay in 2011. The Mural represents Victoria's Aboriginal culture and history and contains strong political statements about the incarceration of Aboriginal people Among other elements, it depicts large-scale renderings of historical artworks by Tommy McRae and William Barak, a representation of Aboriginal men manacled in neck chains taken from a well known photograph, and the Lake Tyers land rights campaign of the 1970s.

Darebin Council allocated $10,000 in its 2011-12 budget for a report on how to restore the artwork and then a further $80,000 in the 2012-13 budget for the mural's conservation and restoration, after it had become dilapidated from weather and an occasional target of graffiti vandals.

The original painted panels were removed, and a restored digital print copy was installed in December 2013.
