= Hosier Lane =

Street in Melbourne, Australia

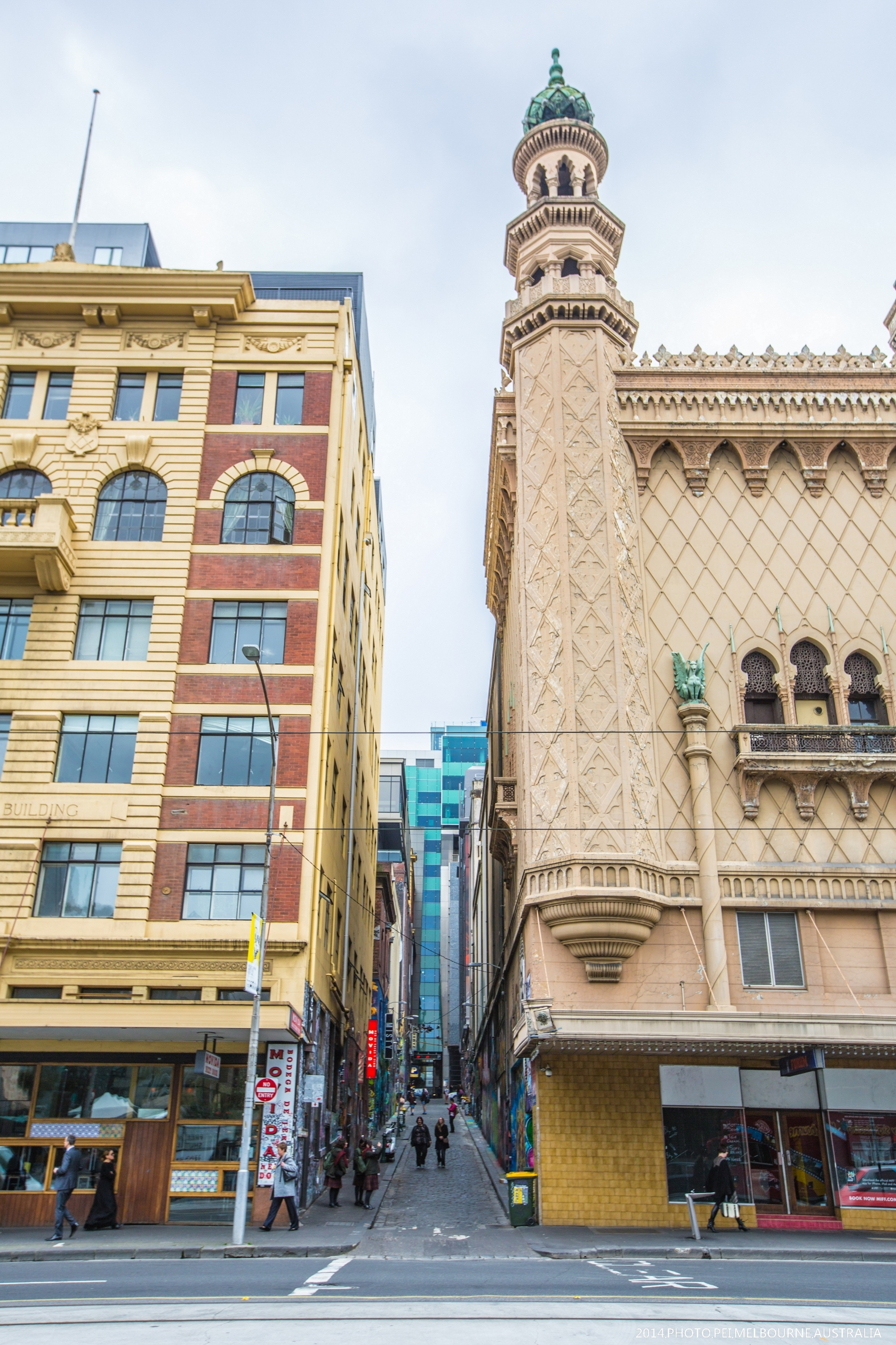
Looking up Hosier Lane from Flinders Street

Hosier Lane is a laneway in the central business district (CBD) of Melbourne, Victoria, Australia. Located on the CBD's southern edge, it extends between Flinders Street and Flinders Lane, and opens opposite the Atrium at Federation Square. Since the late 1990s, Hosier Lane has become a popular tourist attraction due to its street art. Hosier Lane is a long-standing de facto ‘free-to-paint' area that does not require permits or permission.

== History ==
The lane was named after a local businessman by the name of Robert Hosier.

=== Street art ===
Hosier Lane opened as a Street Art Gallery in 1998 by the City Lights Initiative. The lane is located opposite the entrance to the Atrium at Federation Square on Flinders Street, placing the lane prominent position in the city. The lane has been noted for the quality and the often political nature of its art. It features in the state-sponsored book The Melbourne Design Guide and in Tourism Victoria's Lose Yourself in Melbourne advertising campaign, leading to questions about the dichotomy of Victoria's approach to graffiti. The graffiti-covered walls and art-installations have become a popular backdrop for fashion and wedding photography. In 2013 street artist Adrian Doyle painted the entirety of the adjacent Rutledge Lane one color with the consent of the Melbourne city council to create a work he called "Empty Nursery Blue".

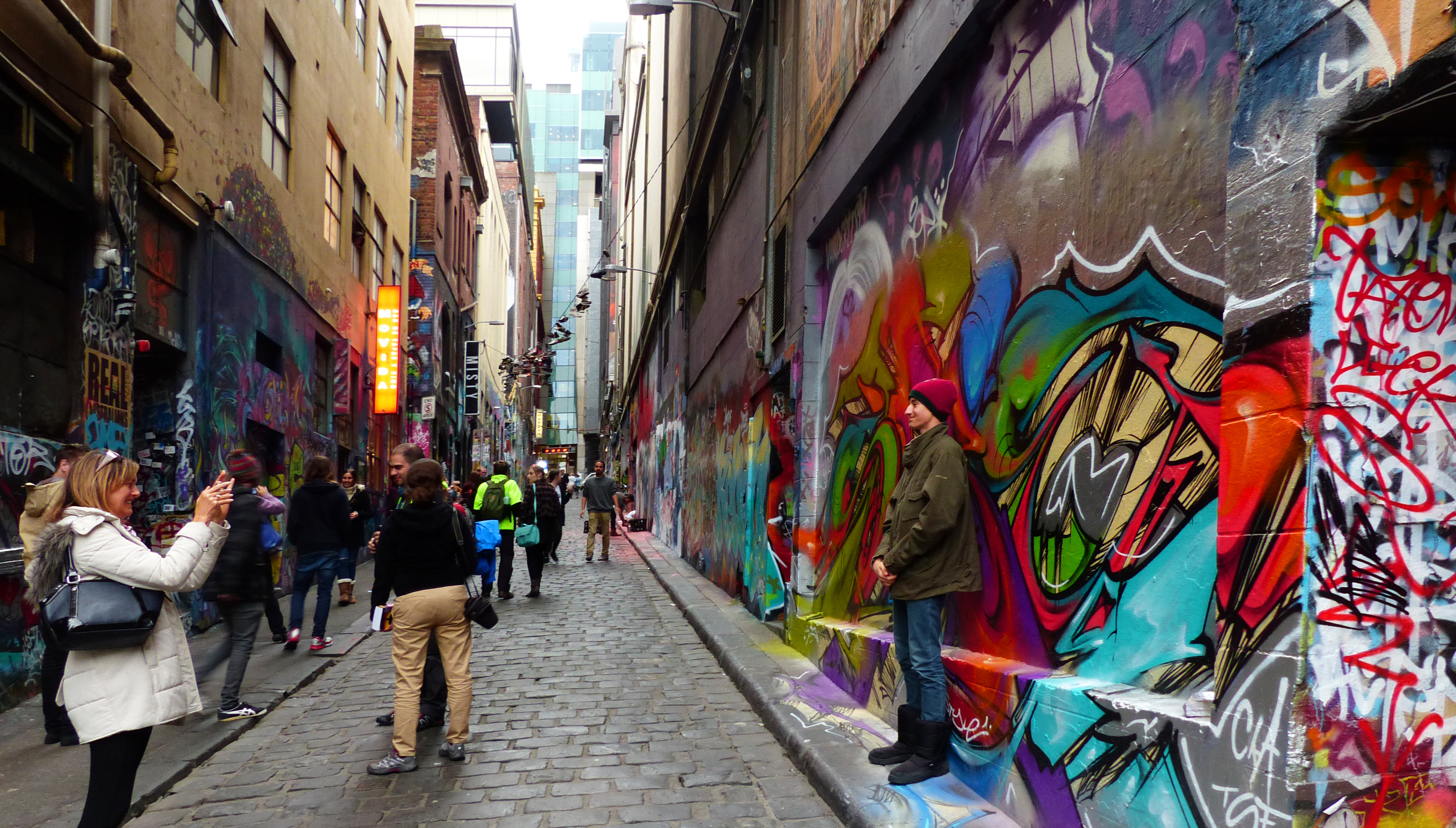
Hosier Lane in 2015

In November 2013, Melbourne's largest urban art paint-up was undertaken in the form of All Your Walls, organised by Invurt, Land of Sunshine and Just Another and held in conjunction with the National Gallery of Victorias Melbourne Now event. Involving some of the city's finest graffiti crews/collectives and street artists, a major makeover of Hosier and Rutledge Lanes was performed, in order to celebrate the significant role street art and graffiti continues to play in the cultural life of this city. Over a period of two massive painting sessions during November 2013, both Hosier and Rutledge Lanes were first entirely buffed black and then completely transformed, top to bottom, by over 100 local graffiti and street artists – all of which culminated in an event with live graffiti projections in Hosier Lane in homage to Melbourne graffiti and street art.

In early 2020, six masked people 'Colour Bombed' the lane, erasing many artworks in the process. This was treated as an act of vandalism by the Melbourne Lord Mayor and was investigated by police for vandalism, while many street artists believed that they did nothing wrong and were just adding to the 'free for all' nature of the site. The incident became the focus of online and tabloid conspiracy theories, with social media users accusing the culprits of being linked alternatively to antifa, Extinction Rebellion, or the Young Liberals, while Daily Mail Australia ran a piece claiming that the Chinese state was behind the incident.

== Other features ==
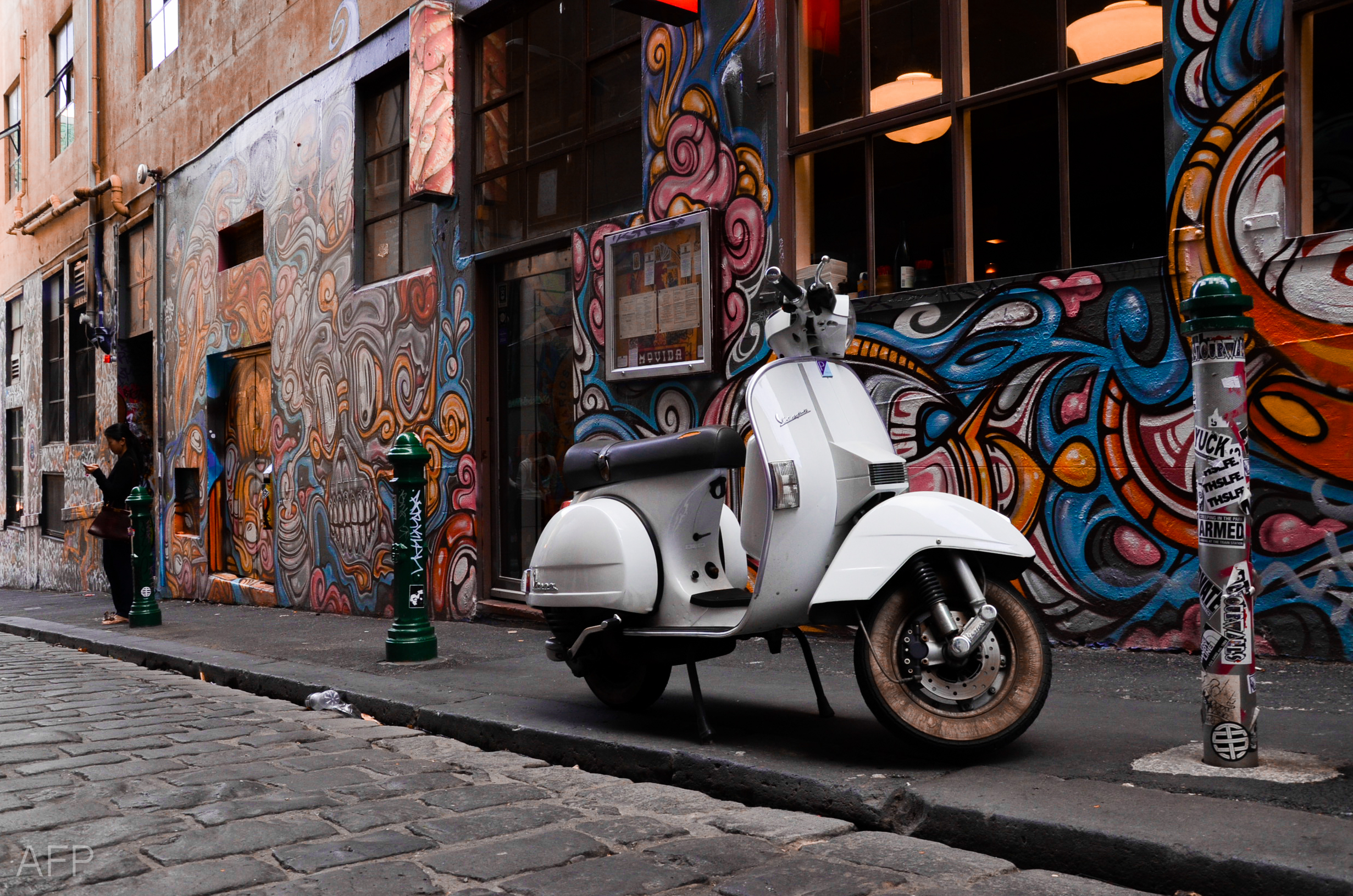
Section of Hosier Lane with bars and cafes

Hosier Lane is also known for its upmarket cocktail lounges including the popular Misty and MoVida. An open air cooking session with MoVida's chef Frank Camorra on season two of Masterchef Australia showcased the lane as a major Melbourne attraction.

The lane will be featured in The Amazing Race 39.

== Gallery ==
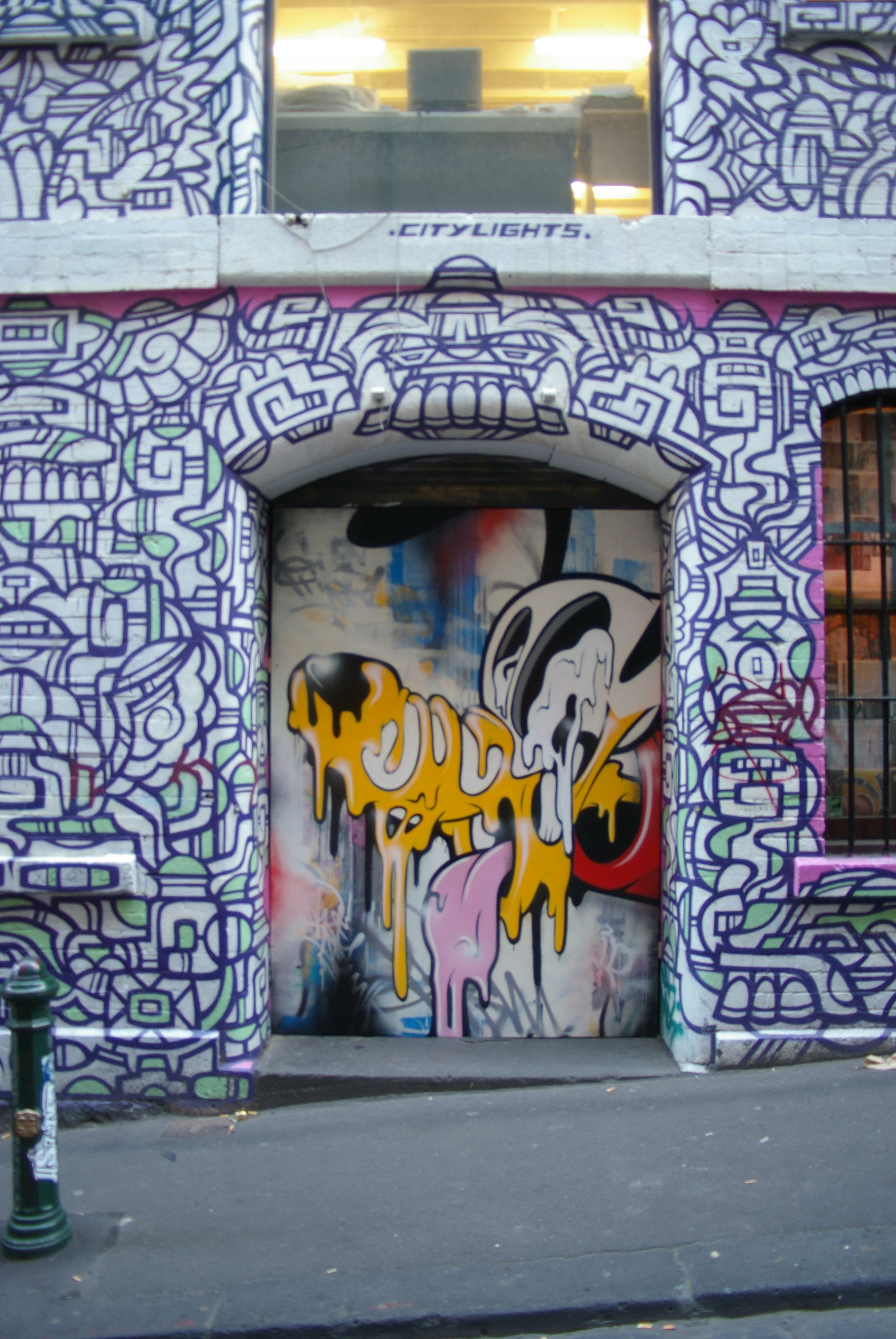
Painted doorway, 2009

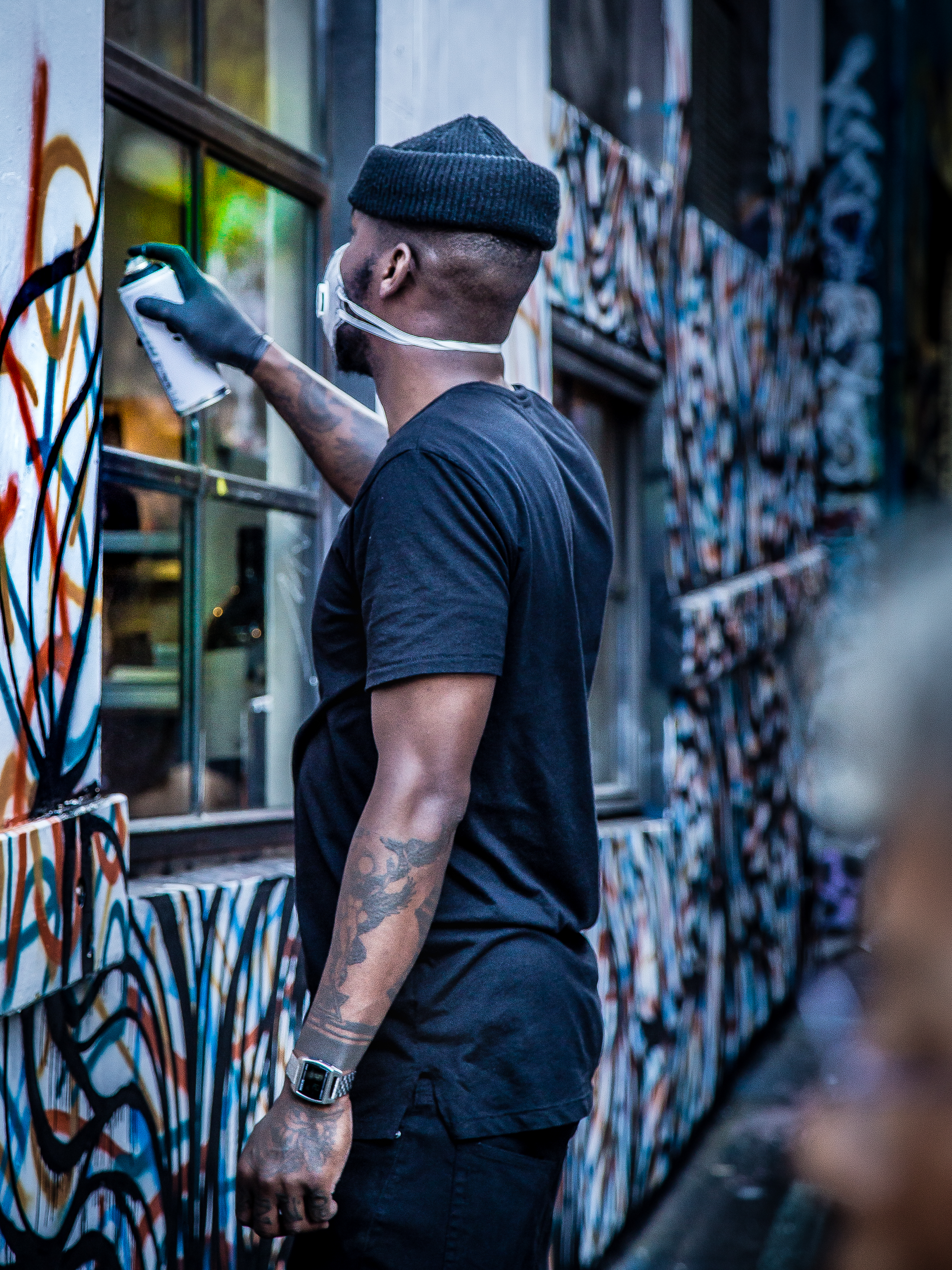
Street artist at work, 2017

== See also ==
- Lanes and arcades of Melbourne
- Street art in Melbourne
