= James Cochran (artist) =

Australian-born English artist

James Cochran, also known as Jimmy C, is an Australian-born English artist best known for his urban narrative paintings and for his drip painting style.

== Early career ==
In the late 1980s Cochran contributed to the development of the graffiti scene in Adelaide and went on to coordinate a number of community arts projects aimed at giving "aerosol art" a broader acceptance in the community, and to teach painting techniques to adolescents interested in the art form.

In the 1990s he adopted the alias "Jimmy C", and become well known for his aerosol art murals and his work in city and regional communities across Australia.

== Artistic development ==
After completing his arts degree in 1997 and then his Master of Visual Arts at the University of South Australia in 2002, Cochran became known for his urban realist narrative paintings, painted in oil, and often depicting the marginalised human subject in the context of the urban environment.

His two interests in graffiti and oil painting converged in 2004, leading to the development of Cochran's signature aerosol pointillist style; portraits or urban landscapes painted entirely from blobs of spray paint. This technique developed into what he called the "drip paintings" and the "scribble paintings", composed of layers of coloured drips or energetic lines to form cityscapes and portraits.

== 2010s ==
Cochran has been based in London since 2012.

In 2017, Cochran was appointed as one of three Fringe Ambassadors for the Adelaide Fringe.
