= Jisoe =

Australian graffiti writer

Justin "Jisoe" Hughes
- Born: 1977 (age 48–49); Victoria, Australia
- Occupation: Artist
- Notable work: Jisoe (2005 film)

Justin "Jisoe" Hughes is a Melbourne-based graffiti writer. He was also known as Jizlad, and is the subject of the 2005 film Jisoe, directed by Eddie Martin, which gained a cult following among graffiti writers. Critic and filmmaker Megan Spencer hailed the documentary as one of her favorites.

Jisoe won the Audience Award at the 2005 St. Kilda Film Festival and competed for featured documentary at the 2005 Slamdance Film Festival.

The film follows a 24-year-old Hughes over a period of a few months in 2001, in which he is at large as a notorious graffiti artist who specializes in the spontaneous and rapid style of tagging trains or "train bombing".
