= Dlux =

Australian street artist (born 1977)

- Born: James Dodd; 1977 (age 48–49); Bordertown, South Australia
- Education: University of South Australia
- Known for: Painting, Sculpture, Street art
- Website: Personal website

James Dodd is a South Australian artist, arts educator and street artist who used the pseudonym Dlux for his street art when he operated out of Melbourne.

== Biography ==
Born in Bordertown in 1977, Dodd has a Bachelor of Visual Art and a Masters of Visual Art from the University of South Australia. Dodd teaches at Adelaide Central School of Art. As a street artist, he used the pseudonym Dlux and was one of a group of street artists who considered legal action against the National Gallery of Australia when it failed to pay them in a timely manner for their works.

== Career ==
He began doing street art in Adelaide in 1998, using stencils to mass-produce stickers. Dodd moved to Melbourne around 2002 because of the street-art scene. As Dlux, Dodd was a powerful presence on the Melbourne streets but also undertook a large amount of gallery work, and his stencils were always very politically motivated. As Dlux, Dodd is also featured in the documentary film Rash (2005), which explores the cultural value of street art in Melbourne.

He was one of the most active street artists in Melbourne but returned to Adelaide to undertake further studies (Masters in Visual Art, University of South Australia. Since then, his practice has expanded to include painting and sculpture, celebrating Australia's culture of rebellion and resistance.

== Artistic style and subject ==
Dodd’s practice incorporates street art, sculpture, and painting. His street art has been criticised for 'glamourising dangerous youth gangs'. His sculpture and paintings reflect his rural upbringing and he uses objects such as bus shelters, bicycles, and surfboards as a basis for his work. He also constructs objects such as River Cycle ('a bicycle in a tinnie'), and drawing and painting machines.

== Collections ==
Dodd’s work is held in the following collections:

- University of Queensland Art Museum (search for James Dodd)
- Australia National Maritime Museum
- National Gallery of Australia (under both James Dodd and Dlux)

== See also ==
- List of Australian artists
- List of people from Adelaide
- List of people from Melbourne
- List of street artists
- Spray paint art
- Types of graffiti
