= Spray paint art =

Spray paint art uses spray painting on a non-porous material, such as wood, metal, glass, ceramic or plastic.

An artist near the street in Japan, 2024

Spray paint art is usually street art, in large cities. Themes may include surreal landscapes of planets, comets, pyramids, cities, and nature scenes. The pieces can have a simple one-colored background or a multi-colored backgrounds in which the paint swirls together or fades from one color to the other through a series of differing values of each color. It is said to have originated in Mexico City in the early 1980s.
