= Street Artists Program of San Francisco =

Municipal arts program

Coordinates: 37°47′17″N 122°24′27″W

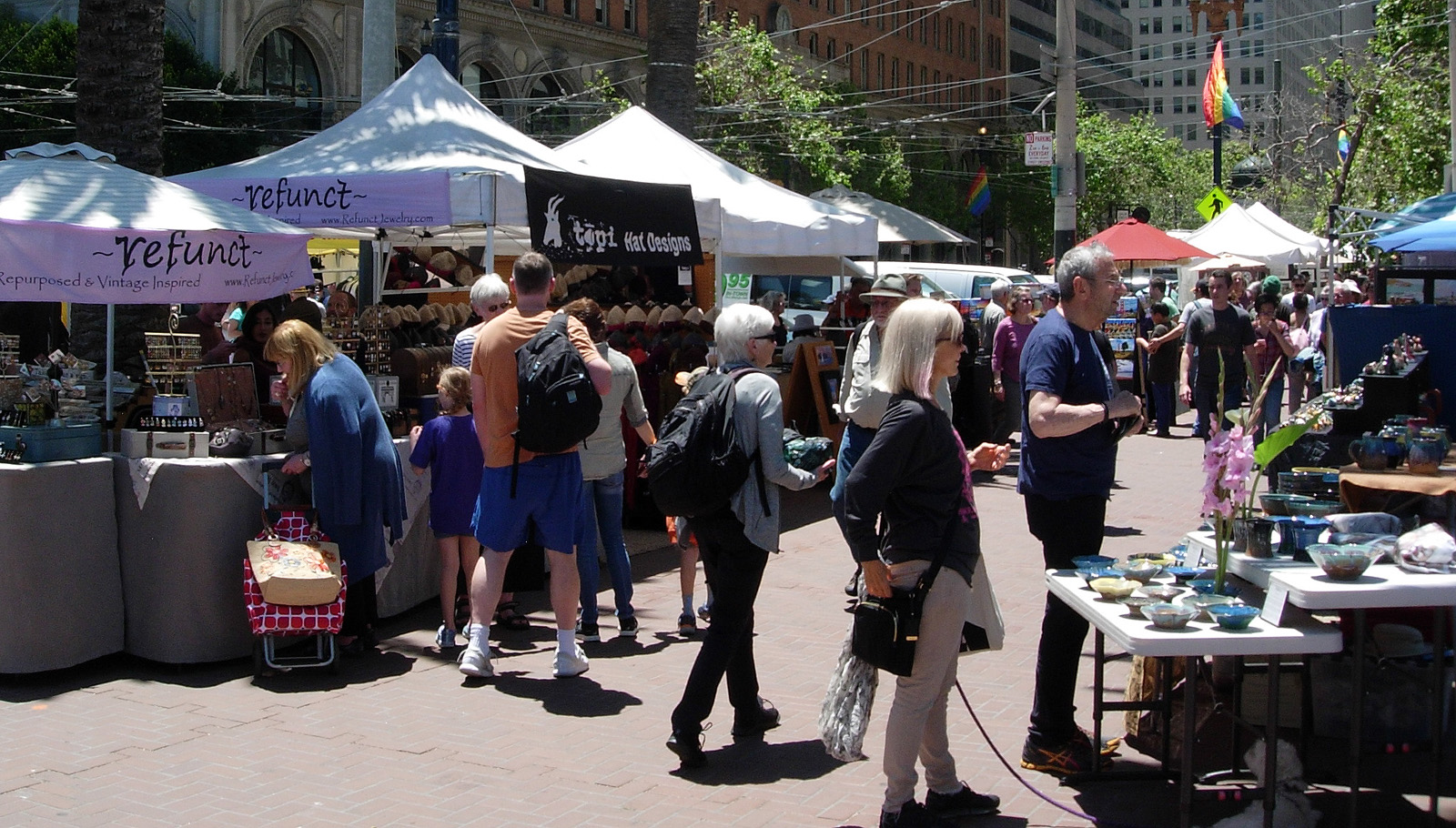
Street Artists selling their handmade work along east Market Street

The Street Artists Program of San Francisco is a municipal arts program in which independent street artists and craftspeople sell their art and craft items in designated public spaces in the city of San Francisco, California. The artists are licensed by the San Francisco Arts Commission and are only allowed to sell work that has been "predominantly created or significantly altered in form" by the street artist. The Arts Commission currently licenses approximately 400 street artists, whose licensing fees cover all program costs. The program generates an estimated $4 million annually for the city's economy.

The program was the result of a hard-fought political battle by street artists who were sometimes harassed and arrested by police for selling their work on the city's sidewalks. In response, street artists strategically organized by forming their own guild, hiring a lawyer, and drafting two ballot initiatives in order to create laws that enabled them to sell their work in public places. Some street artists were willing to be arrested time and again in order to draw media attention to their cause and to push for a change in existing laws.

== History ==
During the 1960s, California was the site of many outdoor art fairs, which nurtured a culture of independent artists and craftspersons. At this time there was an effort to sell crafts on the sidewalks of the liberal Haight-Ashbury neighborhood of San Francisco. Artists and street performers who illegally set up in public areas were frequently harassed and arrested by the police. In the 700 block of Beach Street adjacent to Victorian Park and near Fisherman's Wharf, between 15 and 25 artists would set up their displays and use lookouts to alert them to the arrival of the police.

=== 1971 ===
Following the February 6, 1971 arrest of several street artists, including William Clark, in the 700 block of Beach Street, a first attempt was made to organize the street artists. Under the direction of Warren Garrick (Nettles), a sculptor-painter who would become the group's "chief spokesman", the San Francisco Street Artists Guild was formed. The Guild hired a lawyer, Peter Keane, and began to develop a "political strategy" to manage interactions with the police and with local retail merchants.

Keane and street-art activists noted that artists who were arrested for illegally selling their work on San Francisco's sidewalks were being charged with peddling without a license – although the city's laws contained a provision to issue peddlers' permits. However, the police department, which oversaw the granting of peddlers’ permits, was unwilling to issue any new permits, and it was revealed that only two sellers had been granted peddlers’ permits since 1969. Keane and the activists realized that the city had placed itself in a difficult position by arbitrarily denying access to a provision within the city charter, and prepared to legally exploit that vulnerability.

In April the street artists staged a couple of protests at city hall and at Mayor Joseph Alioto's office while carrying a coffin, which symbolized the death of their incomes as a result of frequent police arrests. The protests garnered news coverage and Alioto promised to speak to the police chief about a solution for the permits, and afterward schedule talks with the artists' organizers. During those later dialogues with Mayor Alioto, Garrick suggested that the city should consider a separate licensing system for artists who sell their own creations, and provide designated selling areas for those licensed artists. Alioto was not resistant to the proposal, the talks went well, and Garrick left the meetings feeling that there would be a moratorium on the arrests.

However, later in May when the talks began to stall, Garrick realized that no real progress was being made with the mayor and the police chief. The artists then acquired a temporary state park permit allowing them to sell in Victorian Park. At the end of the afternoon, when the permit expired, they moved their wares from the park to the nearby sidewalks of Beach Street, the police made arrests, and the moratorium was officially over. When the arrested artists were arraigned before Judge Axelrod, he commented that he "thought that the code section was unconstitutional" because the law sets no clear standards for licensing and makes no provision for fair hearings on permit applications. Recognizing the city's legal jeopardy, the Guild's organizers recruited the ACLU and lawyer Robert Kantor to file suit against the city over the arrests, because the city had given "absolute and unguided discretion to the license granting authority which consistently and systematically denies permits to artists and musicians". The Guild further contended that such works – when sold on public sidewalks – are expressions of art protected under the First Amendment.

In September, as a result of the ACLU lawsuit, a Superior Court judge issued a restraining order that prohibited the police from arresting artists who sold their work on the sidewalks. However, the police did not halt the ongoing arrests, and in October, Judge Ira Brown issued an injunction and scolded the police for ignoring the restraining order. That injunction meant that any police officer who arrested a street artist could be fined or jailed by Judge Brown. Word quickly spread of the new legal privilege and hundreds of new street artists, as well as opportunists, came to the sidewalks of crowded Union Square to sell their wares during the busy Christmas season. The flood of new street artists and other sellers who could now operate with no regulations or enforcement created an environment of chaos, and fights occasionally broke out over the selection of selling spaces. An Ad Hoc Committee Against Street Vendors, formed by San Francisco businessman Cyril Magnin, branded the sidewalk selling scene as a public safety hazard. The disorder and violence that prevailed in December foreshadowed a continuing and grave liability for this and any other street artists program: Without regulation and an enforcement strategy, any street artists program could easily be infiltrated by opportunists who would make money their sole priority, drastically lower the quality of products, sell commercially manufactured items, and occasionally resort to intimidation or violence during selling-space selection.

On December 15 another Superior Court judge overruled the injunction, declaring that the peddlers' ordinance was not unconstitutional, and that the police could continue with the arrests. With less than ten days before the end of the Christmas retail season, Mayor Alioto instructed police to stop the arrests and only issue warnings.

The arrests and legal efforts of 1971 attracted enough media attention that a member of the San Francisco Arts Commission, Ray Taliaferro, expressed his desire that the Arts Commission should support legislation to license and regulate street artists and street musicians. In December, Taliaferro declared to the media, "I hate to see the street artists and musicians run out of the city. This is a significant artistic revolution we see going on. The city should do what it can to encourage these people".

=== 1972 ===
In January 1972 Alioto proposed that artists should be licensed and regulated by some city agency, and he granted the three requested areas where street artists could sell: inside Union Square on weekends, on the 700 block of Beach Street on Sundays, and at Embarcadero Plaza full-time. City Supervisor Quentin Kopp, responding to pressure from downtown merchants, questioned the mayor's authority to initiate such a program. Two other Supervisors, Terry Francois and Robert Mendelson, introduced a resolution that would allow artists to acquire permits, allow the Supervisors to select selling locations, and have the artists' peers judge whether or not their products were of their own creation. It was essential to Alioto and the Supervisors that artists would only be "selling their own work, not commercial products purchased from wholesalers". Alioto and the Supervisors felt that allowing the sale of commercially manufactured items would put the street artists in unfair competition with storeowners, who must also include their rental costs and employee salaries within their prices.

Kopp followed by submitting his own resolution to the Board of Supervisors. Under Kopp's plan, the program would be run by a chief administrator, and the Board of Supervisors would determine who should receive a license and where the artists would be allowed to sell. Kopp also suggested that the price of a license should be minimal, being between $48 and $100 a year.

In March the Board of Supervisors approved a proposal to have street artists receive their licenses through the San Francisco Arts Commission, which would have a committee evaluate if the work was of the artist's own creation and not a commercially manufactured product. Street artist representatives Garrick and Clark were named as chairman and secretary, respectively, of the screening committee. The Board of Supervisors reserved the right to choose selling locations for the artists. Not all members of the Arts Commission were receptive to the proposal. Commissioner Alec Yuill complained that the new responsibilities would be a "demeaning imposition. A matter of public nuisance, not of artistic judgment". Commissioners Taliaferro and Ruth Asawa did support the artists and the creation of a street artists' program.

From the street artists' point of view, the sole area which the Board of Supervisors approved for selling – Embarcadero Plaza – was the least desirable of the three originally proposed selling areas, since there was little foot traffic in the area. The artists' organizers continued to schedule meetings before the Board of Supervisors in an attempt to include the 700 block of Beach Street and downtown selling locations as well. They met stiff resistance from Supervisors Dianne Feinstein, Pete Tamaras, and Terry Francois, who were reluctant to approve any selling areas without the approval of the downtown merchants association. By this time the merchants and retail stores had become very organized and inflexible concerning the issue of additional selling areas. At an August Board of Supervisors meeting, Garrick and Clark protested the inflexibility of the Supervisors by refusing to leave the podium, and were arrested for disturbing the peace. Frustrated with the impasse over additional selling areas, the two resigned from the screening committee in December and many newly licensed artists risked arrest and went back to selling illegally on the 700 block of Beach Street and on the downtown sidewalks.

=== 1973 ===
In 1972 and 1973 the Street Artists Guild made nine appeals to the Board of Supervisors for viable selling spaces before deciding to submit a ballot initiative directly to the voters. Under the state constitution, laws can be enacted directly by citizens via a ballot initiative process and the approval of a majority of voters during an election. Clark authored a ballot initiative called Proposition J, which would require about 12,500 signatures of registered voters in order to qualify for placement on the ballot in an upcoming election.

=== 1974 ===
Clark and other street artists gathered 26,000 signatures for Proposition J, which was included on the ballot in the municipal election of June 1974. The initiative passed by a margin of 53.4% to 46.5%, with 80,991 votes in favor and 70,418 votes against. Under Proposition J, street artists were allowed to sell their wares virtually anywhere on the city's sidewalks. The new arts program attracted hundreds of new artists to San Francisco's sidewalks, and by December 1974, 1,500 street artists would be licensed.

In September, a few months after the ballot initiative passed, the downtown merchants association began to complain that the sidewalks had become flooded with street sellers, and that their displays created "wall-to-wall street artists" who "seriously hamper pedestrian traffic". In the beginning of December, the police, carrying out new Fire Department rules, began to clear many street artists out of the downtown area. Their explanation was that the artists and their displays were blocking fire hydrants and store exits. Though the artists left quietly after police warnings, the Street Artists Guild said it would challenge the police crackdown in court. The next day, an appeals court judge issued a writ of mandate that temporarily blocked the enforcement of the new Fire Department rules until a hearing by Judge Ira Brown would be held in Superior Court. At the same time, the Guild's lawyer set up a meeting with the artists to create a system of self-regulation, in an attempt to keep them out of the courts.

Without any regulation or enforcement, selling spaces were acquired on a first-come, first-served basis. So many artists decided to sell near the popular downtown areas that some had to show up as early as 3 am in order to get a good selling space for the day. Eventually some sellers began to guard their selling spaces overnight. Frustrated with the congestion caused by street artists, the Board of Supervisors passed a new ordinance, sponsored by Kopp, which sharply reduced the number of selling locations by specifying that an artist's display must be on a sidewalk that was wide enough to allow a 10 feet (3.0 m) wide pedestrian walkway. Since many sidewalks were not wide enough to satisfy the width requirement, the ordinance effectively eliminated 98% of selling spaces granted by Proposition J. The street artists' concerns over the restrictions of the Kopp Ordinance were eased by the fact that the ordinance was likely to be challenged in court by the Guild's lawyers, because it conflicted with the provisions of Proposition J.

=== 1975 ===
The Kopp Ordinance was approved by the Board of Supervisors in January 1975. For the first half of 1975 the artists grudgingly sold within the Kopp Ordinance's restrictions, but by May many artists chose to protest the new ordinance by violating its provisions and selling in "undesignated areas", choosing to be arrested and jailed rather than simply signing a police citation and going home. In June the Board of Supervisors, sensing the vulnerability of the Kopp Ordinance within the courts, decided to write its own street artists ballot initiative called Proposition L, which would repeal Proposition J. (By law, a voter-approved ballot initiative cannot be overturned by the Board of Supervisors, only by another ballot initiative.) Proposition L would set up a stricter system of artist regulations, registration, and inspection. It would also give the Board of Supervisors power to regulate selling locations.

State Senator George Moscone, at the time a candidate for mayor, sided with the street artists in opposing Proposition L. He stated, "The attempts to harass them off the streets of our city and to circumvent the will of the people as expressed through their approval of Proposition J are, to me, terribly wasteful". Moscone would later become mayor and demonstrate a very supportive position for the Street Artists Program. In 1976, when the street artists nearly lost all their downtown selling spaces after the Board of Supervisors voted to permanently remove them, Moscone's mayoral veto preserved those selling spaces for decades to come.

The street artists responded to the threat of Proposition L by drafting their own, new ballot initiative for the November 1975 election, called Proposition M. Proposition M further limited the power of the Board of Supervisors over selling-space selection while setting forth provisions for fire and safety regulations that would ease sidewalk congestion. In an effort to appease the merchant community, Proposition M called for reducing the number of artists around Union Square by 75%, implementing a system to insure that artists make what they sell, and limiting the number of artists in a given region by using a lottery system to equally share designated selling spaces.

To the disappointment of the artists, Proposition M failed and Proposition L became law during the November election. To date, the ordinance defined by Proposition L is still the current law which sets forth the procedures and privileges of the Street Artists Program of San Francisco. After the passage of Proposition L, street art activists met with the Board of Supervisors to resolve which selling areas would be designated for them. The Board of Supervisors granted 21 selling regions in the Union Square area, on Market Street, at Fisherman's Wharf, and on Beach Street near Ghirardelli Square. It was also decided that the Public Works Department would mark off and number selling spaces on the sidewalk so the spaces could be equally shared among the artists, with a daily lottery for selling-space selection. Concerning the dangerous problem of artists guarding their selling spaces overnight, street artist Joy McCoskey reiterated the importance that no selling space should be occupied between the hours of midnight and 6 am. The downtown merchants seemed content with the new regulations and selling spaces. In early December the new ordinance went into effect, and 800 street artists bought licenses for a fee of $80 per year.

== Licensing ==
Street artists who are licensed by the San Francisco Arts Commission are only allowed to sell items that have been "predominately created or significantly altered in form" by the artist. The program strictly forbids the sale of commercially manufactured products.

=== Screening committee ===
Before a street artist license is granted, artists must demonstrate to a screening committee they were the producer of the item for sell. During the screening of an artist's work, the artist must bring finished items and bring raw source materials, partially completed items, and receipts for the raw materials of the product. The members of the screening committee can also ask that an artist create a piece in their presence. If committee members are still not satisfied that the work is of the artist's own creation, they can conduct an onsite visit to the artist's workshop to verify the creation process.

The committee licenses street artists in a number of specific categories of arts and crafts, including bead making, bead stringing, button craft jewelry, candles, castings, ceramics, sculpture, coin cutting, computer-generated & new technology art, decoupage, doughcrafting, DVDs/cassette tapes/CDs, enameling, engraving, fabricated and/or cast jewelry, feather art, fiber art, found objects, glass art (blown glass and stained glass), kite making, lapidary, leathercraft (including belts and soft clothing), millinery, miscellaneous items, musical instruments, painting and drawing, paper and papier-mâché jewelry, photography, pipes, plants and dried flowers, plastic and metal arts, printmaking, puppets and dolls, sewn items (including some puppets and dolls), shell jewelry, string sculpture, terrarium making, textile arts, toy making, and woodcraft.

Licenses are not granted for street artists who produce or sell "food items, incense, perfumes, body oils, soaps, or other cosmetic products". Street musicians and performers are not included in the ordinance.

=== Violations and penalties ===
Since it is not unusual for some street artists to sell items which they did not make, the program's rules have provisions for citing and penalizing artists who violate regulations. Violations can be issued for selling commercially manufactured items, selling crafts that they were never screened to sell, and for selling handmade items not of their creation but made by another craftsperson – possibly by another street artist.

Violations can be reported not only by the police, but by the staff of the Art Commission, a storeowner, a member of the public, or even another street artist. At various times, the Street Artists Program has hired individuals to work as Art Inspectors, patrolling the sidewalks looking for street artists whose items violate craft criteria, or who are in violation of other regulations. A subcommittee of the San Francisco Arts Commission, called the Street Artists Program Committee, meets once a month to deal with ongoing issues specific to the program as well as to hold hearings for street artists who have been cited for violating regulations, such as selling commercially manufactured items. If the Program Committee finds that an artist has violated regulations, the committee's members have the option to either suspend or revoke that street artist's license.

The initial formation of the Street Artists Program was dependent on a certain amount of cooperation from the merchant associations, especially in the designation of selling areas. If a street artists program develops a reputation that it is allowing commercially manufactured items, the very organized merchant community of retail stores will urge city government to limit or disable that program.

== Designated selling locations ==
Street artists are allowed to sell only in designated areas named within the original ordinance. Occasionally other locations are added by the Board of Supervisors. The designated selling areas include: Fisherman's Wharf, the downtown financial district, the Cliff House, and Justin Herman Plaza. Unlike other public arts programs, such as Seattle's Pike Place Market, San Francisco does not assign selling spaces by seniority. Daily lotteries and a selling-space signup procedure are held every morning to determine an assignment of selling spaces for that day.
