= Streetart Festival Istanbul =

Turkish annual post-graffiti festival

Streetart Festival Istanbul is Turkey's first annual street art and post-graffiti festival. The festival was founded by artist and graphics designer Pertev Emre Tastaban in 2007.

== History ==
=== 2009 ===
From June 12–13, 2009, the first festival took place in the Galata area in Beyoğlu. For the Morphosis group exhibition, the abandoned "Banker Han" building was adapted by 45 participating musicians, graffiti, and street artists.

Participating artists included: Bay Perşembe & Sebeke, Bomba Fonda, Bonan, Cins, Copikstar, Cype, Das Metal, Deniz m. örnek, Emr3, Eskreyn, Fly Propaganda, Gogo, Hikmet Vandal, Iac, Ini, Kırdök+1, Lakormis, Madcat, Mateman, Mmurat Başol, Nenuka, Osman, Pet05, RR, Kedü, Kuyara, Rad, S2k Wide, Yeni Anıt, MC's Fuat & Apo, Gaia, Saltyspinzitfunky, Deniz K., Tai Fu, Deform-e, and Sonashine.

=== 2010 ===
Ne yersen o'sun streetart graffiti painting exhibition.

The concept about Genetic played "organismas that we ate", at Maslak in a 500 m^{2} field and 10 meters high. It was covered in murals. Nine street artists participated in the exhibit. On opening night U.F.U.K performed. 650 attended. Artists were: Pet05, Street Projects/Omeria /Jellyfishandroyale/Fiberoptik/Sunya Atay/Bayan Anderson/Cuneyt Celik/Insan Taklidi /Zamanevvel.

In 2010's festival munich scene participated, around the city outer walls painted and at nayah festival opened with 4 floors painting and live performance from express brass band (munich)

Form Germany came Blash, Kiam77, Loomit, Neon, One2, Rosanna Schumacher, Ssatone, Skore183, Ssquaredynamic. Turkey added Asu Ceren, Cuneyt Celik, Cooper, Dünya Atay, Eskreyn, Iberoptik, Flypropaganda, Fu, Funk, Goksu Gul, Jellyfishandroyale, Kmr, Küf Project, Levent Bozkurt, Mekazoo, Miray özcan, Nnuka, Omeria, Pet05, Shione, Sesin çıksın, Tabone, Techone, Yeni Anıt, Zoe, Wicx, and Choma. The music was provided by Express Brass Band. Istanbul sent A.P.O & Yener & 9 Canlı, Deniz K., and Deform-e.
