= Robert Kantor =

Robert Kantor may refer to:

- Jacob Robert Kantor (1888–1984), American psychologist
- Robert Kantor (sculptor) (born 1943), American lawyer and sculptor
- Robert Kántor (born 1977), Czech ice hockey defenceman
