= Juilee Pryor =

Australian muralist

Juilee Pryor is a street artist and an abstract artist from Sydney, Australia.

Pryor is most well known for her large-scale mural artwork in Sydney and its inner-suburbs. She has been an active artist since 1982, her most recent work being in 2015 with a set of prints called "happy birthday fat grrl #1 - 3."

Pryor now lives in Austinmer, New South Wales.

== Notable achievements ==
- I Have a Dream Mural
- How the light gets in (Master of Visual Arts)
- Member of the Unmitigated Audacity Productions artists' collective

== See also ==
- Newtown area graffiti and street art, a significant work area for Pryor
