= Street artist =

Person who makes art in public places

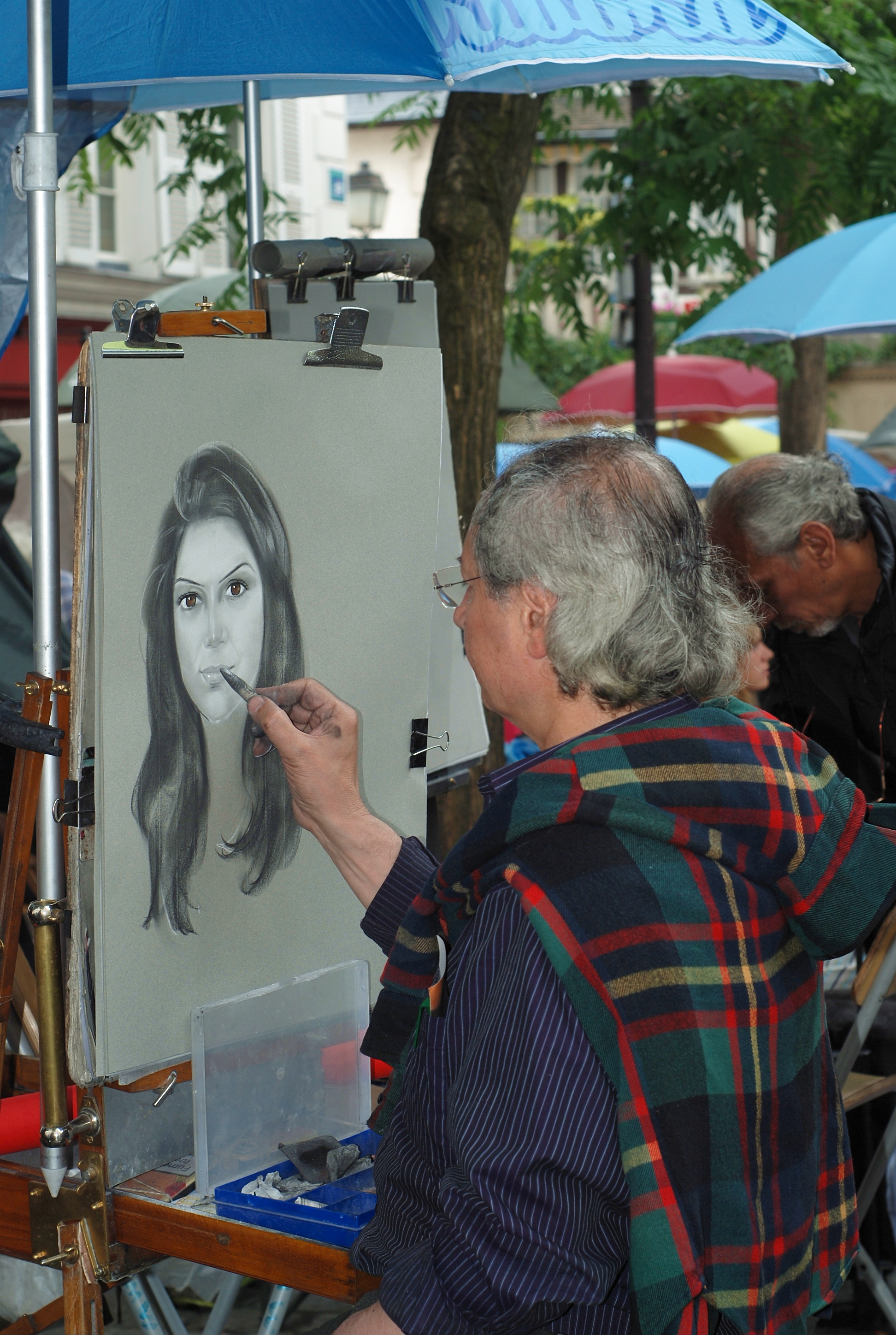
Street artist, Place du Tertre, Paris

A street artist is a person who makes art in public places. Street artists include portrait artists, caricaturists, graffiti artists, muralists and people making crafts. Street artists can also refer to street performers such as musicians, acrobats, jugglers, living statues, and street theatre performers. Street artists can be seen throughout the world.

== Legality ==
Some countries and sub-national jurisdictions require a license or permit in order to do business as a street artist. Without legal authorization, artists run the risk of being fined or arrested by the police if municipal ordinances prohibit their activities. For graffiti artists and muralists, part of the experience may be finding a suitable wall, permitted or not. In some municipalities, artists may apply for a license that allows them to legally occupy public space or a permit to paint a building. These licenses and permits place limitations on where the artist can perform or create their art, and may also regulate what artists are allowed to sell or depict. San Francisco, Berkeley, and Seattle are American cities that regulate the display and trade of artists selling their wares on the street. Additionally, San Francisco has a public approval process for murals painted on public buildings or using public money on private property.

Graffiti art is often seen as a controversial art form and can at times be referred to as vandalism. However some graffiti artists have become famous for their art, notably Banksy and Shepard Fairey also known as Obey.

== Gallery ==
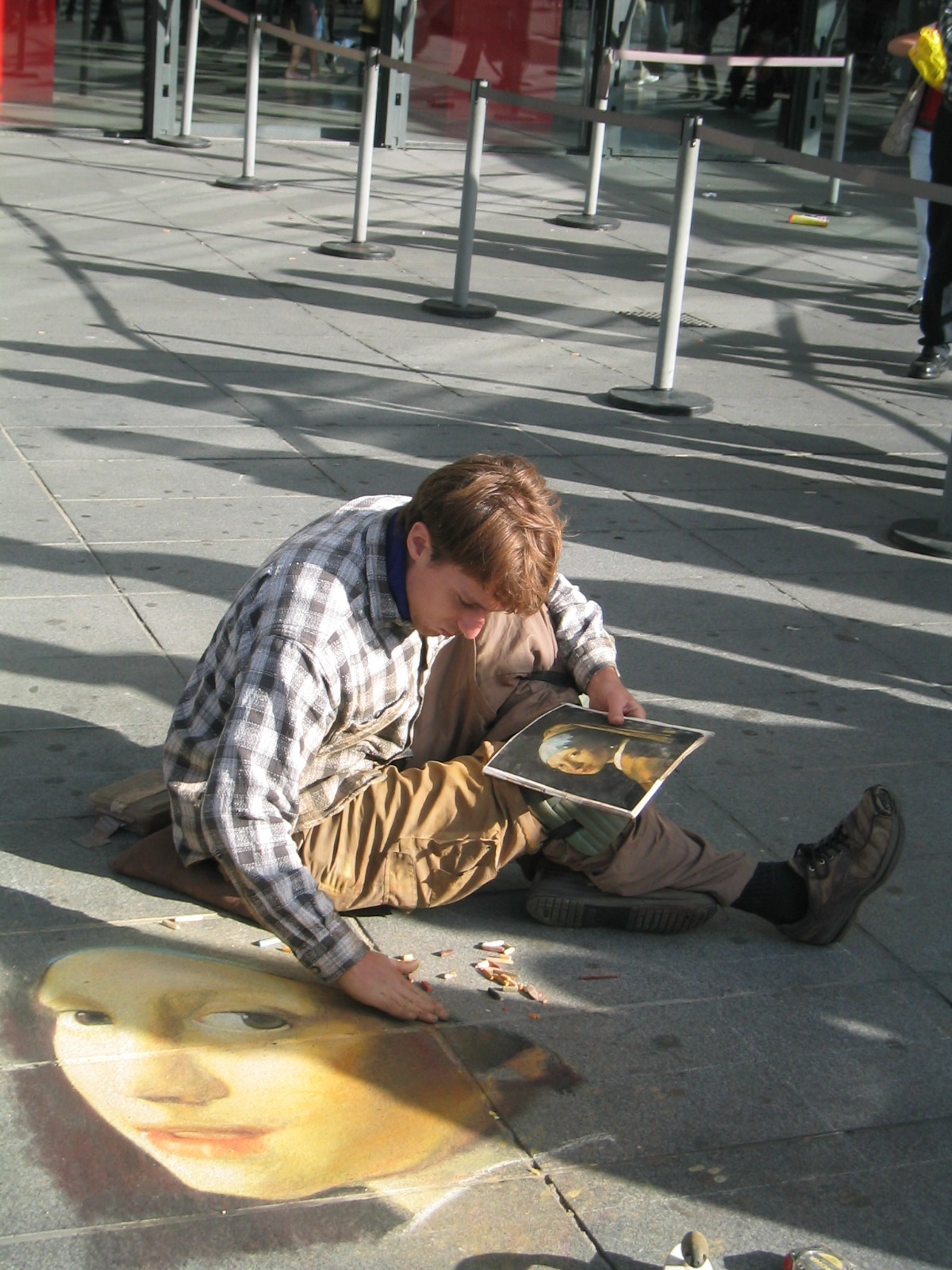
A street painter working near the Centre Pompidou, Paris. The painting being copied is Vermeer's Girl with a Pearl Earring.

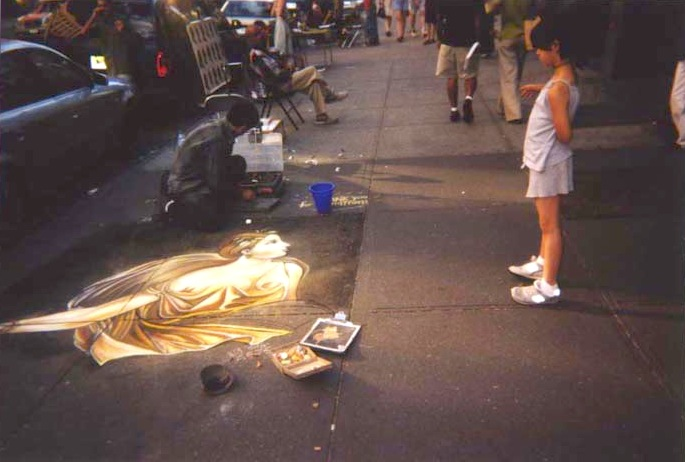
A street painter in New York City (July, 2000)

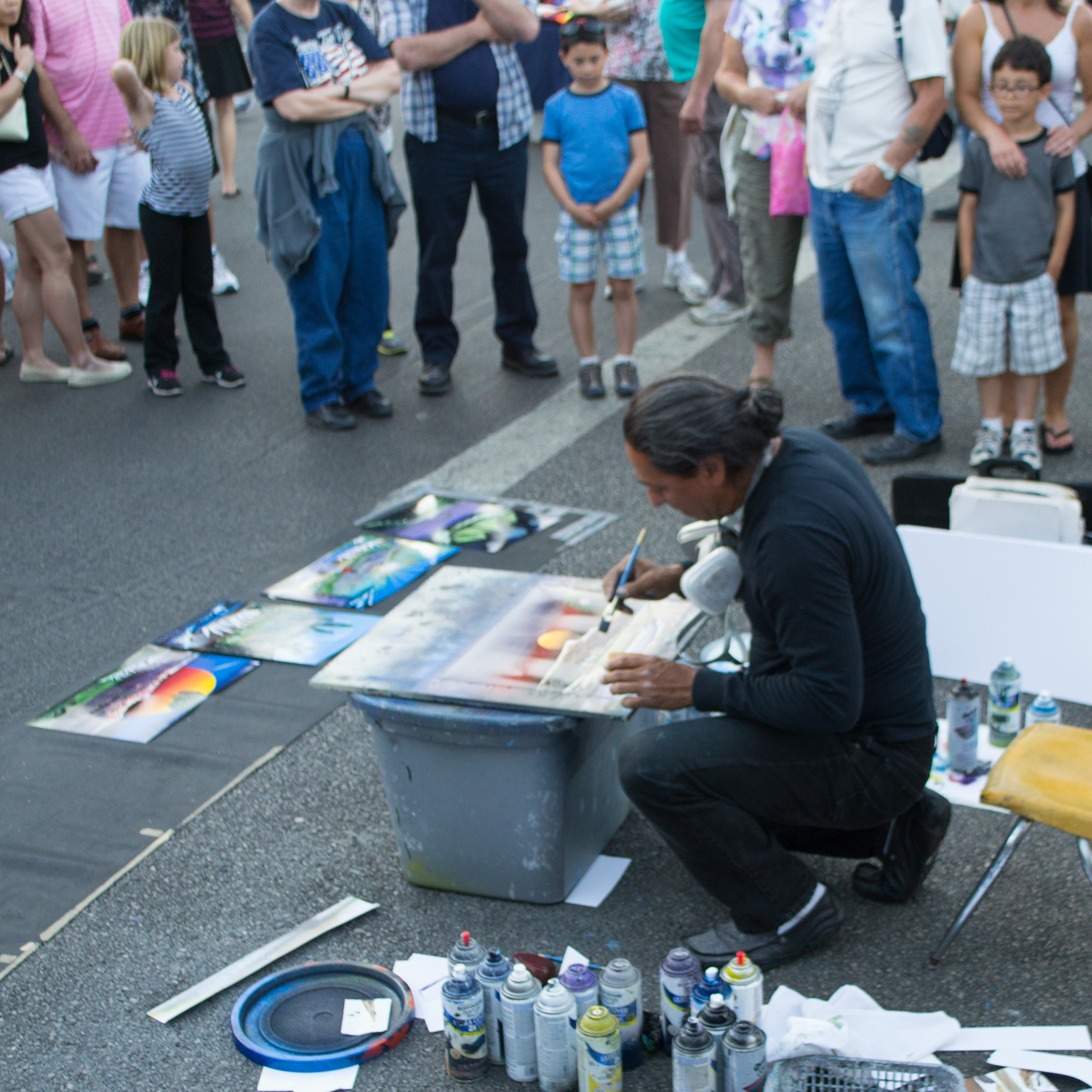
Street artist in Palm Springs, United States.

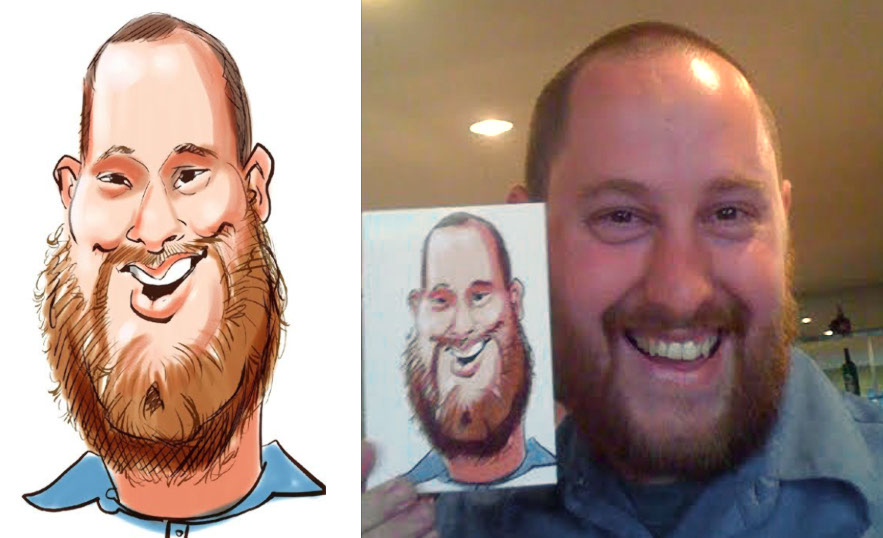
An example of a caricature, a popular form of street art

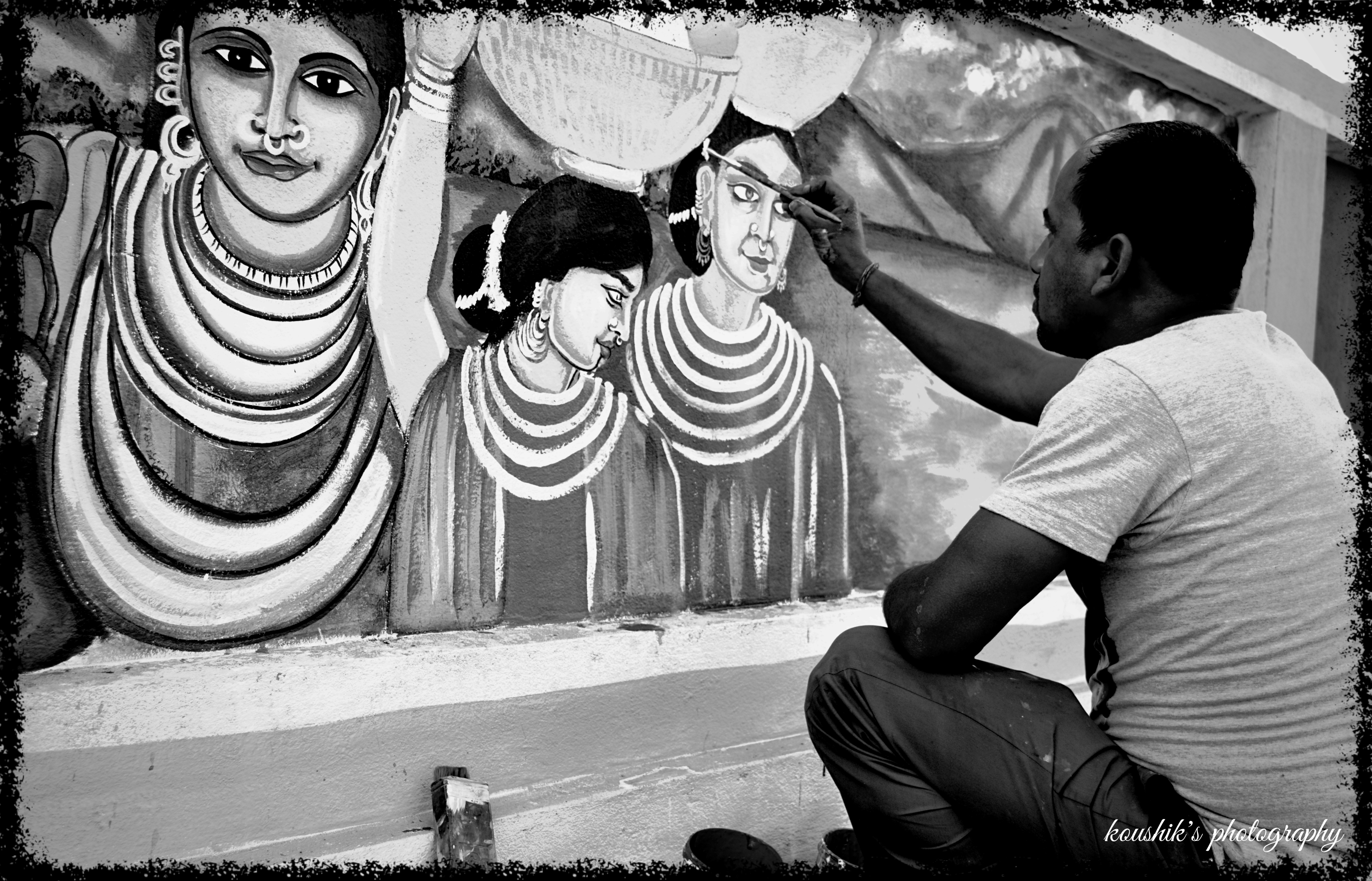
A muralist paints his work on a building.

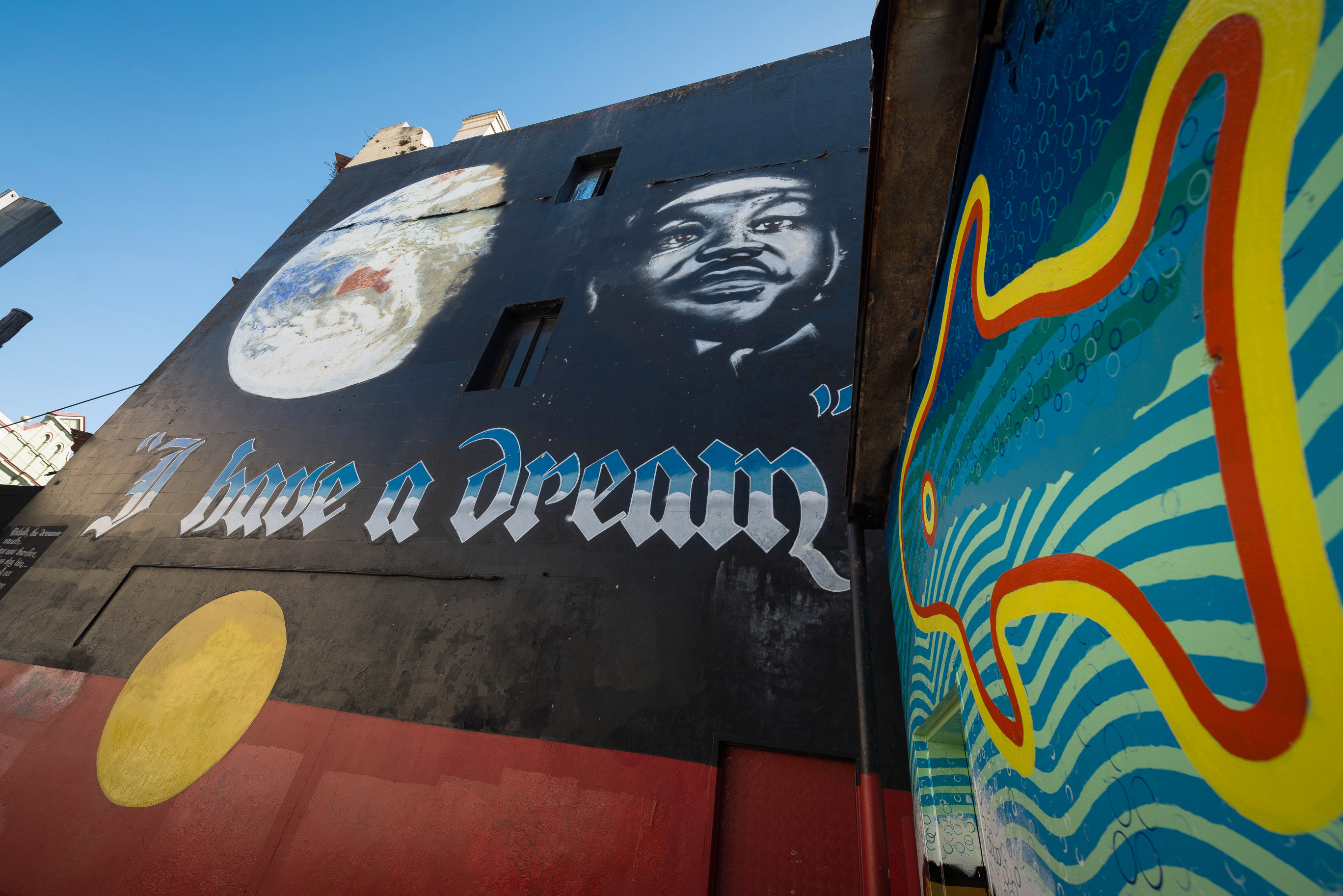
Andrew Aiken/Juilee Pryor: Martin Luther King Mural on King St, Newtown, 1991, now heritage listed.

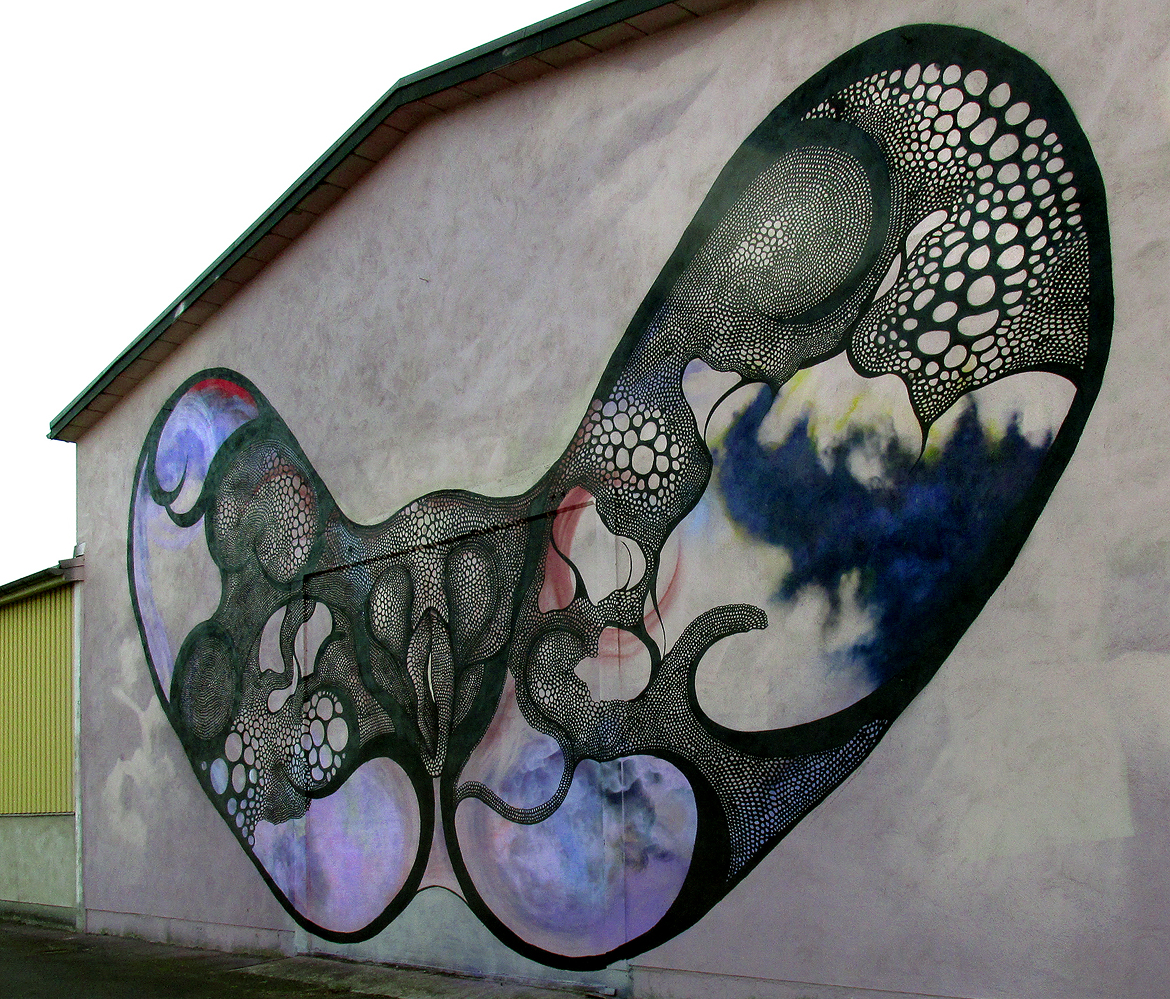
A mural by Carolina Falkholt in Ystad/Sweden 2015.

== See also ==
- Mural
- Graffiti
- Street painting
- Street art
- Busking
- Pike Place Market
- Street Artists Program of San Francisco
- Street Fashion
- Street Style
- Street Photography
