= Newtown area graffiti and street art =

Culture in Sydney, Australia

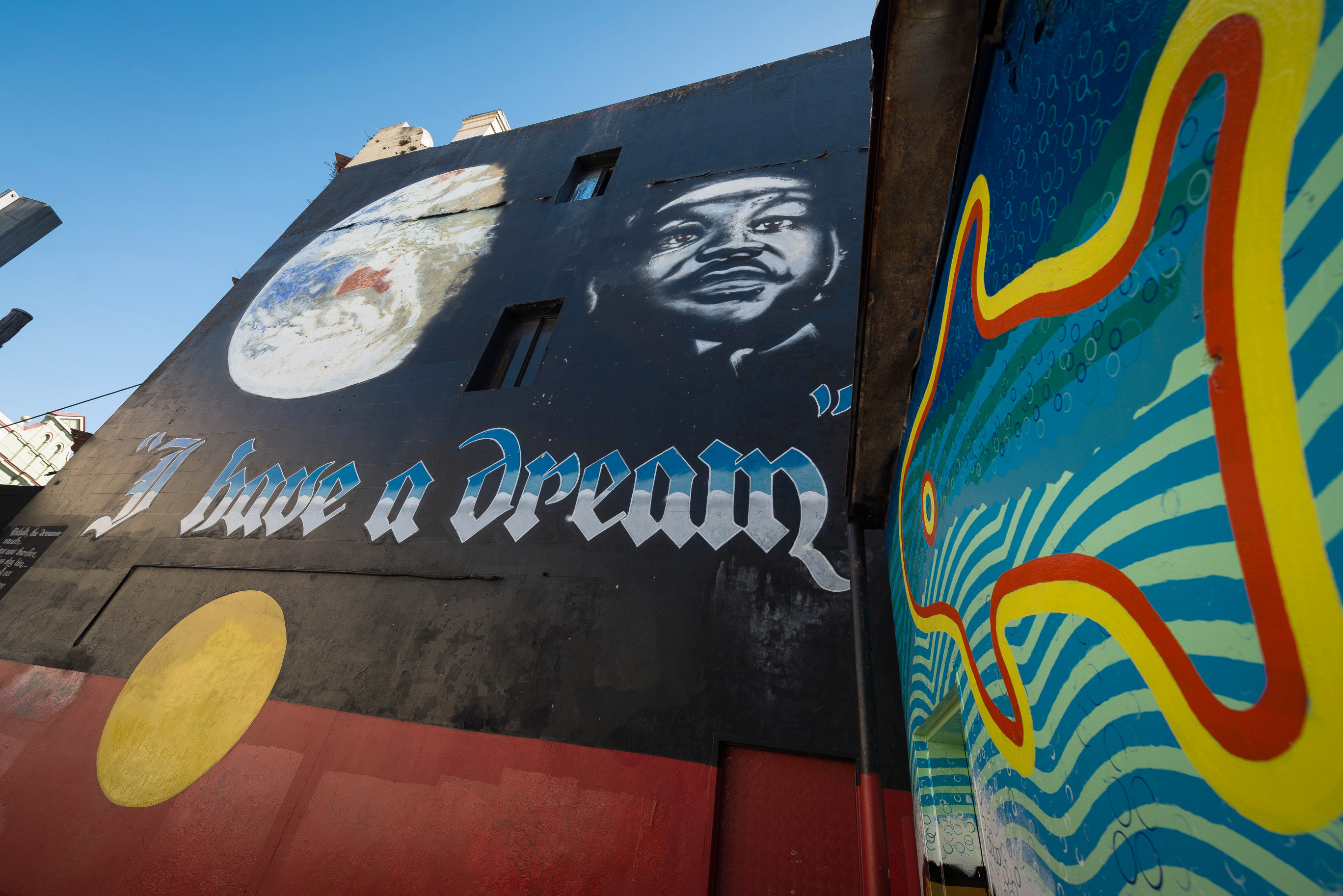
Andrew Aiken/Juilee Pryor: Martin Luther King Mural on King St, Newtown, 1991, now heritage listed.

Since the 1980s, the area surrounding the Sydney inner west suburb of Newtown, Australia, including the suburbs of Enmore, Erskineville, Camperdown, and St Peters, has been known for its wide range of prominent graffiti and street art on walls. The public visual art in the Newtown area consists of a variety of styles and methods of execution, including large-scale painted murals, hand-painted (or sprayed) political slogans, hand-painted figurative designs, spray painted semi-abstract designs (including large-scale and elaborate semi-pictorial) "tags"), and other stylistic developments such as stencil art and street poster art (also known as "wheatpasting"), "Yarn bombing", and sculptural items cast from plaster and other materials.

== Locations ==
Street art locations in the greater Newtown area include:

- Murals facing onto King Street and adjoining streets
- Stencil art around the photographic studio in Gladstone Street, near Newtown station
- Stencils, slogans and murals in and around the pedestrian tunnel under the railway line, linking Bella and Bedford streets
- Graffiti works in the area between Enmore Road and the Main Suburban railway line, including Gladstone Street, the Wilford Street industrial area, Wilford Lane, Phillip Lane and Thurnby Lane.
- Murals, stencils and graffiti slogans in and around Camperdown Memorial Rest Park
- Wall art in the vicinity of St Peters station and Applebee Street, near Sydney Park
- The multi-panel spraypaint mural on the rear wall of St Luke's Church, Enmore by Matthew Peet (a.k.a. "Mistery")

Another example is two slogans painted on the wall of a house on Salisbury Road in Camperdown, at the Kingston Rd intersection. A large hand-painted slogan that displayed, "Madonna: The Devil Incarnate", was accompanied by a smaller slogan that read, "iConsume". Both slogans lasted approximately two weeks before being painted over.

== Artists and attribution ==
Although several major works are community or private commissions, or were carried out with permission, others are illegal. Artworks are therefore rarely attributed to their respective artists due to the need for anonymity. Another impediment to attribution is the abstract nature of the pieces and identifying "tags" of the creators.

=== Unmitigated Audacity Productions ===
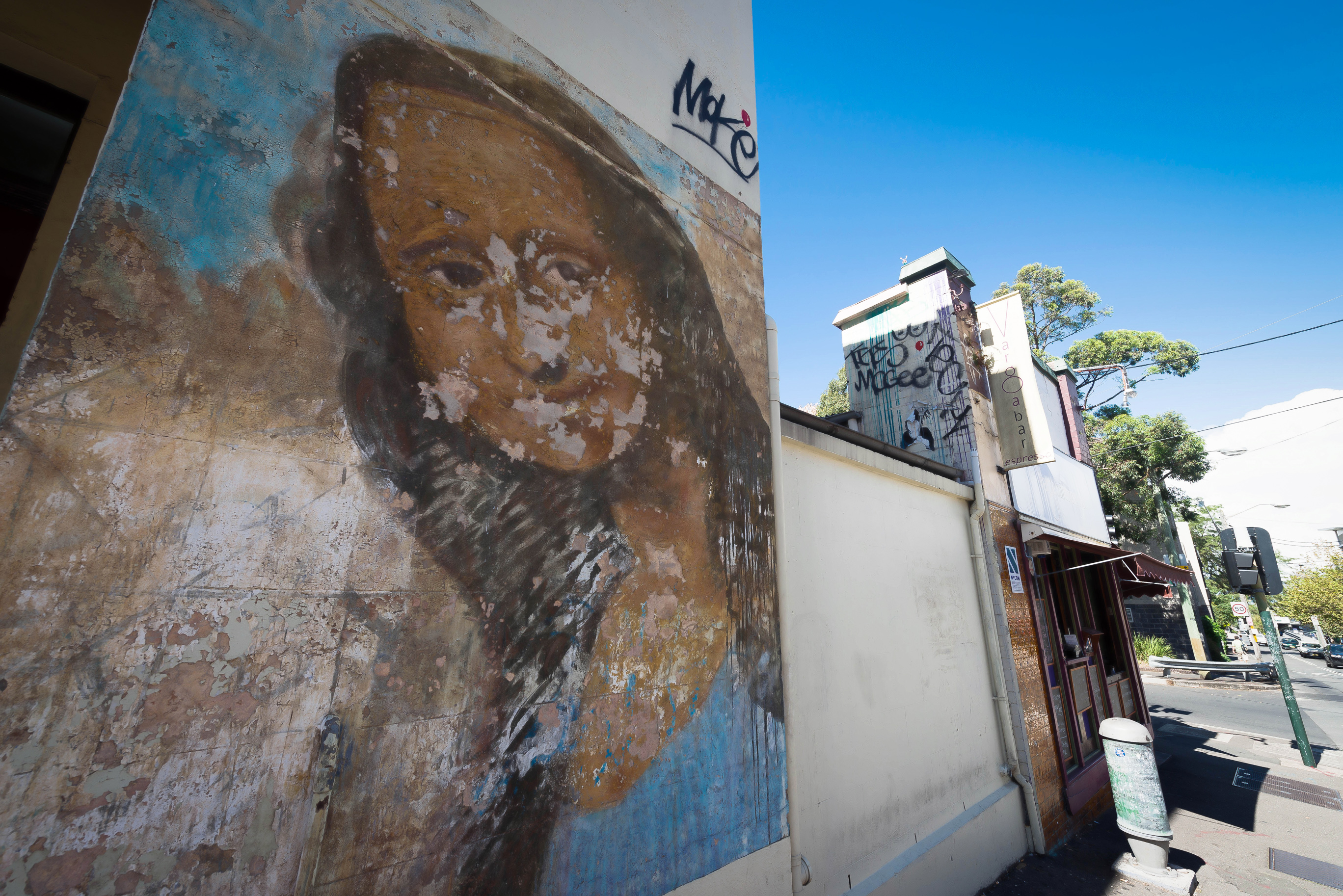
Andrew Aiken: Mona Mural Erskinville Road, Newtown, c1990.

Many of the biggest and best-known large-scale murals painted in Newtown in the early 1990s were created by a group of mural artists called "Unmitigated Audacity Productions (UAP)". This group included Sydney mural artists, Matthew Peet (a.k.a. "Mistery" and member of hip-hop group, Brethren), Juilee Pryor, and New Zealand-born artist, Andrew Aiken.

Among the past and present murals that can be attributed to UAP are:

- The "Martin Luther King" mural on King Street, painted by Andrew Aiken and Juilee Pryor (with Tony Spanos), now heritage listed.
- The "Mona" mural by Andrew Aiken, on Erskineville Road opposite Newtown Post Office; as of 2011, still in existence, but now in a poor state of preservation.
- The "South of the Border" mural on King Street South, near the Union Hotel.
- The Newtown Police Citizens Youth Club (PCYC) murals, by Matthew Peet and Andrew Aiken; the PCYC was demolished in 2015 and a new apartment complex is currently under construction.
- The now-erased Miles Davis/John Coltrane mural on Erskineville Road ("On The Wings of a Song"), painted by Aiken and Peet.
- The now-erased "Per Ardua ad Astra" mural, painted on the wall of the house opposite the "On The Wings of a Song" mural; the piece is clearly visible from Newtown Railway station.
- The "Pieta" mural, by Andrew Aiken, painted on the side of a (currently abandoned) house on Erskineville Road, opposite the BP service station.
- The now-erased "Idiot Box" mural at 64 Erskineville Rd, opposite the Imperial Hotel was created by Andrew Aiken.
- The large multi-panel mural on the rear wall of St Luke's Church in Stanmore Road, Enmore, was painted by a team led by Matthew Peet As of early 2016, this has largely been defaced or erased and only a few sections remain.
- "Deja Vu 1" (1992), was painted on a wall on the corner of Erskineville Road and Linthorpe Street. According to Pryor, it was painted by Aiken "...in an explosion of rage about the war in Bosnia. The theme is remembrance and the futility of war. On the base of the wall can be seen the words 'Have we already forgotten?'". This mural is no longer extant and the building on which it was painted was subsequently demolished and replaced by an apartment complex.

Juilee Pryor photographed much of the group's mural work and she has donated digital copies of these photos to the City of Sydney's photographic archive on the ArchivePix website

=== Andrew Aiken ===
Andrew Aiken was the principal artist and major collaborator on several of the most prominent murals in the Newtown area in the early 1990s. His life was detailed in a 2003 Sydney Morning Herald article by Sean Nicholls. Using a donated cherry picker and a thousand dollars' worth of paint, Aiken and Juilee Pryor created the "I Have a Dream" mural on King Street over two nights in August 1991, describing it as a "humanist protest against the sterility of postmodern art".

Twelve months earlier, Aiken had fled the UK after murdering a man he had lived with in a London squat and burying the body of the 40-year-old busker in the squat's cellar. In 1997, after converting to Christianity, Aiken was convinced to give himself up by the leader of the religious group he had joined, the Twelve Tribes community in Picton, New South Wales. He returned to England, where he was tried and convicted of murder. He served 8 years in prison and, on his release in 2005, joined another Twelve Tribes community in Chilliwack, British Columbia.

=== Big City Freaks ===
The "Big City Freaks" street art collective, founded in 1998, includes the artists DMOTE, PUDL, SNARL, SKULL McMURPHY (Troy Edwards), SET and ZEN (a.k.a. SKOTE STYLES). The group has executed several large-format murals and other works in the distinctive "blended" style, combining highly stylized tags and striking graphic elements such as monsters, aliens, robots, skulls and designs sourced from Japanese art. Probably the most popular and currently the longest-surviving example of their collective work is the "Great Wave" mural. The group has its own website, where images of many of the group's works can be seen. One of BCF's most recent works is a large-format mural, created in late October 2009 on the rear wall of the Ausscrap Building, facing Wilford Street, Enmore.

The mural is featured on the CD back cover photograph of the album, Size of the Ocean, by Sydney, Australia band, Big Heavy Stuff.

=== Other artists ===
- The murals on the Abbey on King backpacker hostel, and the portraits of George Harrison and Jimi Hendrix on the Bella Street house are by Jason Moses

== Preservation ==
Several of the largest and most prominent Newtown area murals, dating from the early 1990s, are no longer extant.

The Council of the City of Sydney administers much of the north Newtown area. In Paragraph 8 of its Aerosol Art and Graffiti Policy the Council ostensibly recognizes that these existing large murals are public-domain works worthy of conservation and maintenance, although in practice it has done nothing to prevent murals such as "Idiot Box" from being removed. Moreover, a Council media spokesperson recently stated that its general approach is "... to remove graffiti quickly and consistently to help maintain the appearance of our city while discouraging repeat incidents".

Because many larger painted murals and other works have been installed covertly and without permission as "guerilla" art works, individual property owners have often stripped and/or painted over a number of the area's most prominent works of street art in recent years. Many others have been obscured by adjacent construction or destroyed by the demolition of the buildings on which they are painted, as in the case of the wall along Wilford Lane, Enmore, which formed the rear part of the former Blockbuster video store site, which was redeveloped into a large apartment complex. The extensive martial arts-themed murals along the rear of the former Murray's Martial Arts centre on Kingston Rd were destroyed when the old building was demolished in 2016 for a new apartment development but the developers have commissioned new custom wall art for the site, which is already in place.

Many other works are gradually covered over with more recent work by other graffiti artists after a period of weeks or months.

In recent years, the former Marrickville Council (subsequently force-amalgamated into the Inner West Council) introduced a new policy on street art by establishing the "Perfect Match" program, in which the Council brought together local property owners and street artists, who were commissioned to create custom art works for fences and walls. These works are officially sanctioned by the Council and are signposted with a special plaque that includes information on the artwork and the artist.

== Murals and wall art of the Newtown area ==
=== King Street north and environs ===
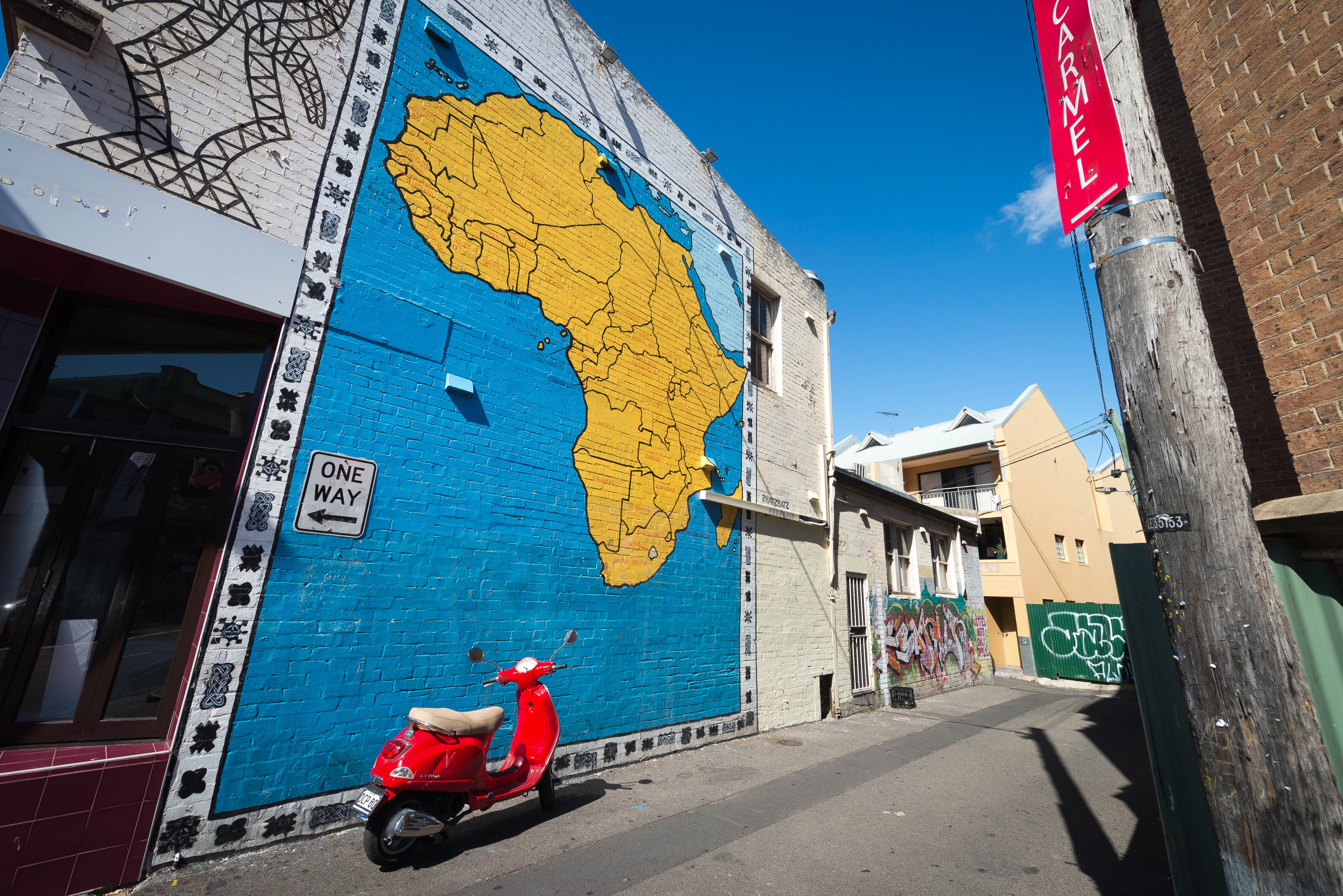
Africa Mural off King Street, Newtown, c2000.

The first mural that visitors will encounter when traveling south along King Street from the city is the "Herald" mural in northern King Street. This large mural is an enlarged reproduction of the above the fold of the front page of the 10 July 1992 edition of the Sydney Morning Herald newspaper, as can be clearly seen in the accompanying image. The image below the SMH says 'No Time'. At the bottom right hand corner used to be the words 'like the present'. This little section was removed during the creation of a driveway for the business that set up next door (around the mid-2000s).

The "I Have a Dream" (Martin Luther King) mural, painted over two nights in August 1991, is the largest, most prominent, and the longest-surviving of the many large format murals created around Newtown by the team known as Unmitigated Audacity Productions, the core members of which were New Zealand-born Canadian artist Andrew Aiken and his colleague Juilee Pryor. They were assisted in this mural by Tony Spanos, who provided a cherry-picker to allow the upper part of the mural to be painted. It commemorates American civil rights leader Dr Martin Luther King Jr. One of the last surviving large-format murals in the area, it displays a large portrait of Dr King, next to a large painted depiction of the Apollo 8 photograph of the Earth from space, and quotes Dr King's 1963 "I Have a Dream" in large Gothic lettering, near which is the quotation from Genesis 37:19: "Behold the dreamer cometh; Come now therefore and let us slay him, and we shall see what will become of his dreams".

The upper section of the design remains largely unchanged from its original concept. A portion of left-hand-side of the mural was damaged by a 2011 fire that destroyed a temporary ticket booth set up nearby, but it was restored soon after. The lower part of the mural has gone through numerous changes since it was first painted. At the time the mural was created, there was a raised garden bed against the wall of the building and the shrubs planted there partially obscured the bottom section, which initially featured a painted collage of a group of people. The council cleared the vegetation soon after and the lower part of the mural soon began to be defaced, notably with racist graffiti, which Aiken and Pryor quickly painted over, sometimes with anti-racist slogans. Frustrated by criticism of the mural by Marrickville Council's Community Arts Officer of the time, Aiken then over-painted the figures with a quotation from the officer ("Murals are no longer a valid art form") in large white Gothic lettering. He subsequently repainted the entire bottom section with a Newtown "Declaration of Independence" that featured a large blank space and the invitation "Sign here". At some point after this was painted, the council removed the garden bed and the declaration was in turn replaced with the design that is still in place, a large representation of the Aboriginal flag.

The Last Supper Mural on King Street is located opposite the intersection of Church Street. Despite broad community acceptance of the mural and the general respect shown to it, the mural has recently been defaced by vandal taggers who climbed onto the roof of the building it is painted on (and many others in the vicinity) and who spray-painted tags on the top edge of the mural and many other buildings in the vicinity.

The "Africa" mural in King Street was originally painted in the early 1990s. The large work occupies the entire side wall of an African restaurant, located between the Newtown Mission and the Commonwealth Bank. The first version was reproduced from an old map printed by the Australian firm Chas. Scally & Co., most likely dating from the 1960s. The current version, painted over the original in the early 2000s, reflects the major changes in African political geography in the recent times.

The "Eagle" mural is located in Wilson Street on the rear wall of the Newtown Mission. The graphic style and content are very similar to the "Martin Luther King" mural and it is presumed to have been created by Andrew Aiken sometime in the early to mid-1990s. The lengthy Biblical quotation on the left-hand side of the mural is from the Book of Isaiah 40:28-31.

=== King Street south ===
There are many prominent murals and "wall art" works to be found along the southern end of King Street, between Newtown station and St Peters station/Sydney Park. Only a few of these face directly onto King Street, and most are located along the side walls of buildings on the corners of King St and the various side streets that lead off from it.

The "South of the Border" mural (created by Unmitigated Audacity Productions) is located on the side wall of a shop on King Street, opposing the Union Hotel. This mural was clearly visible for many years, but is now obscured by a tree growing in the front yard of the terrace house next door.

=== Enmore Road ===
The major mural along Enmore Road is the "Jungle" mural painted on the side of the medical practice on the corner of Bailey Street and Enmore Road, next to the Caltex petrol station. Created by retired artist, Colin Bebe, it depicts various African wild animals rampaging around the intersection of King Street and Enmore Road.

=== The "Great Wave" mural ===
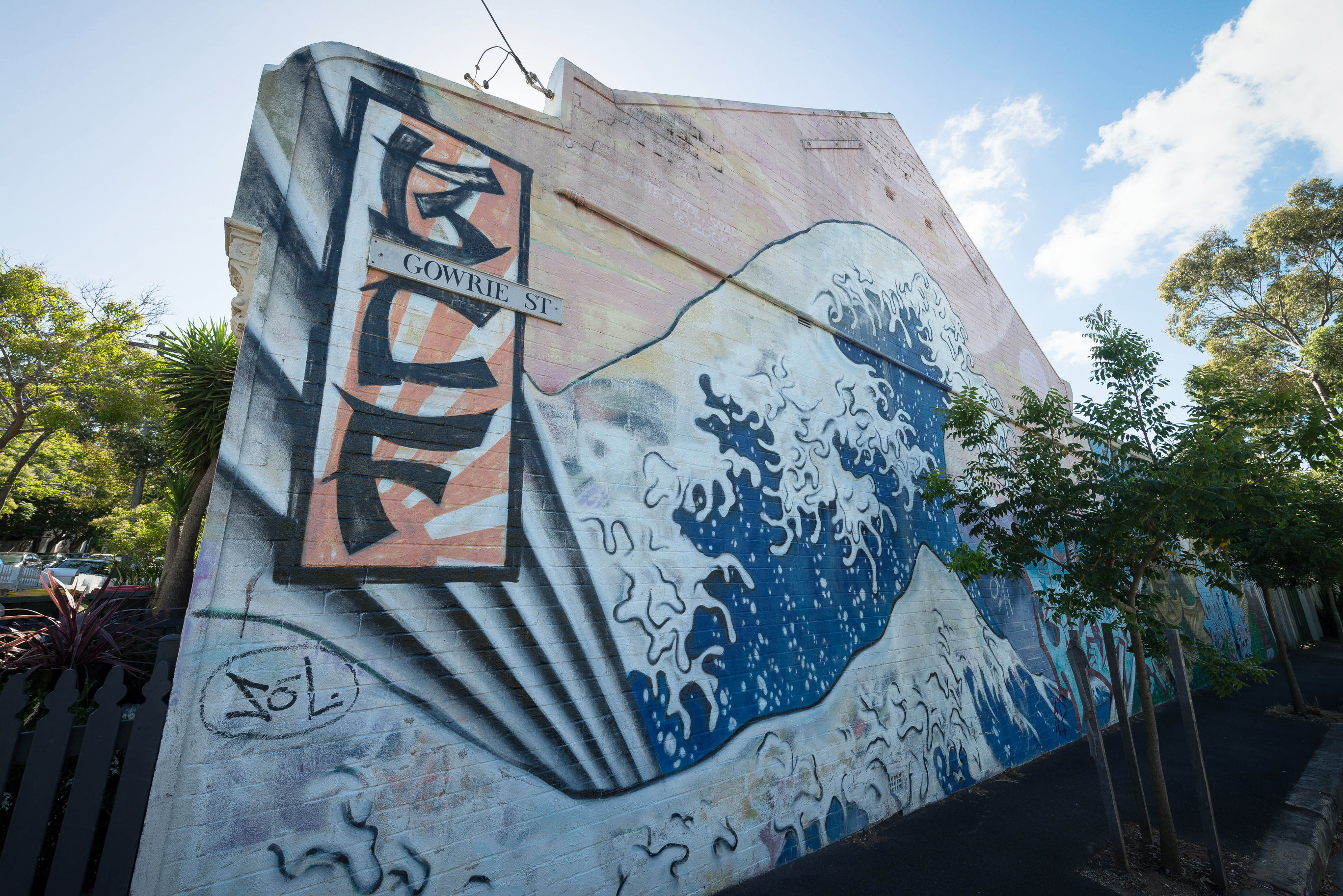
BCF: Great Wave Mural Munni/Gowrie St, Newtown, 2000.

One of the largest and longest-lasting Newtown murals is the "Great Wave" mural, painted on the side of a house located at the corner of Munni Street and Gowrie Street in south Newtown. Created in 2000, it features a striking combination of elaborate 3D style abstract pieces and pictorial images on a Japanese theme, including a huge image of a breaking wave rendered in the style of the famous Hokusai woodcut The Great Wave Off Kanagawa. The work is credited to artists "DAYS", "DMOTE", "PUDL" and "SNARL", members of the street art collective "Big City Freaks" (BCF), whose initials can be seen on the far right of the Great Wave mural. In October 2009 members of this group rendered a new mural along the rear wall of the Ausscrap building, facing Wilford Street.

=== Trafalgar St ===
The two story terrace located at the corner of Trafalgar St and Liberty St in Newtown was another prominent Newtown street art site. The work was commissioned over time during the mid to late nineties to give street artists a prominent wall for their work and to brighten an otherwise grey point in the urban landscape. The street-side walls of this house were adorned with a number of images including 1970s cartoon character Fat Albert (painted on the side fence), a large flowing design incorporating a mermaid (depicting the owners love of swimming), and a group of aliens. The Fat Albert was done by Rory (Rors/Akira?) and the aliens by Phiber/Phibs, both prominent artists of the area. The portraits of George Harrison and Jimi Hendrix on the Liberty Street frontage were by graphic artist Jason Moses, who has collaborated with Matthew Peet and who also painted the travel-themed murals on the walls of the Abbey on King backpacker hostel in King Street. This property was sold in early 2008 and underwent extensive renovation during 2010, resulting in the eventual destruction of all the murals painted there prior to 2010. In late 2013 two new mural works, one depicting Bogart and Hepburn in The African Queen, and the other of singer Freddie Mercury were painted onto the Trafalgar St side of the building (facing the railway).

=== Other large murals ===
"Shine" mural, Linthorpe St

"Guard Dogs", near Newtown Station (2007)

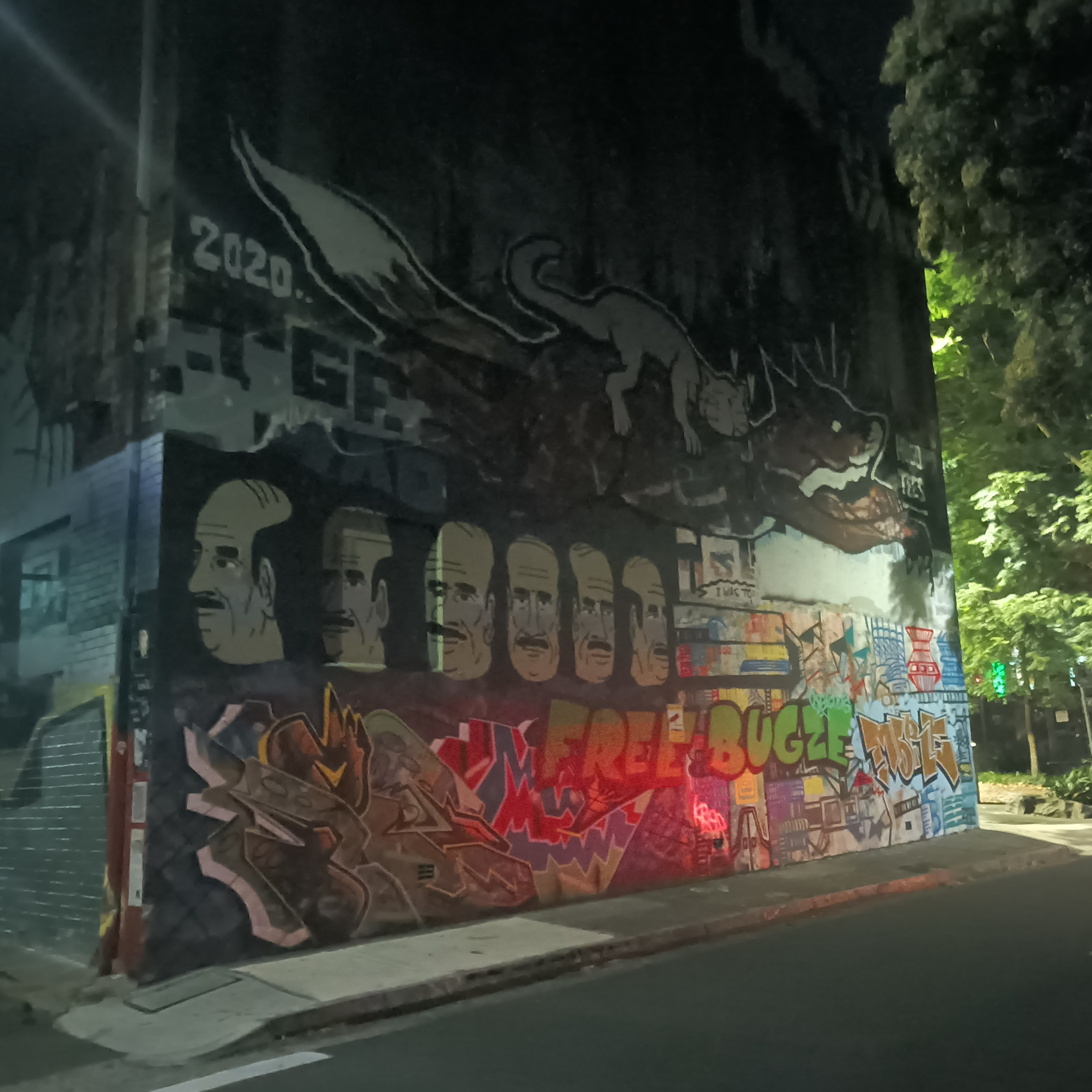
Street art on the side of The Hub Theatre. (2026)

The "Three Proud People" mural faces the railway adjacent to the Macdonaldtown station. Created ca. 2000, the mural is a reproduction of the famous photo taken at the 1968 Mexico City Olympics, when African-American athletes Tommie Smith and John Carlos sparked controversy by wearing black gloves and giving the "Black Power" salute during their medal award ceremony. The third person in the image was Australian athlete Peter Norman, who died in 2006. This mural became the subject of significant Australian media coverage at the time of Norman's death. For many years, the mural was a landmark for thousands of commuters who passed it daily on Sydney's western rail line. In 2007, RailCorp erected high concrete noise barriers near Macdonaldtown station, which obscured the mural from train travellers. In 2008, Melbourne filmmaker Matt Norman led a campaign to attempt to force RailCorp to install transparent noise barriers to allow the mural to be seen by commuters.

The "Sydney '04" mural is located on the corner of Eve and Coulson Street, Erskineville. It was painted in 2004 with the permission of the owner by a team of artists—Australian graffiti artist Dallas (who also created a controversial commissioned mural in Surry Hills ) and two others. Their tags, obscured by the car in the photo, are "Days Aus", "Drift NL" (from the Netherlands) and "Webs NZ". The owner added the red 'No War' slogan in 2007 as a protest against the war in Iraq and a kind of tribute to Saunders and Burgess, the peace activists who painted a "No War" slogan the Opera House in 2003.

=== Enmore laneways ===
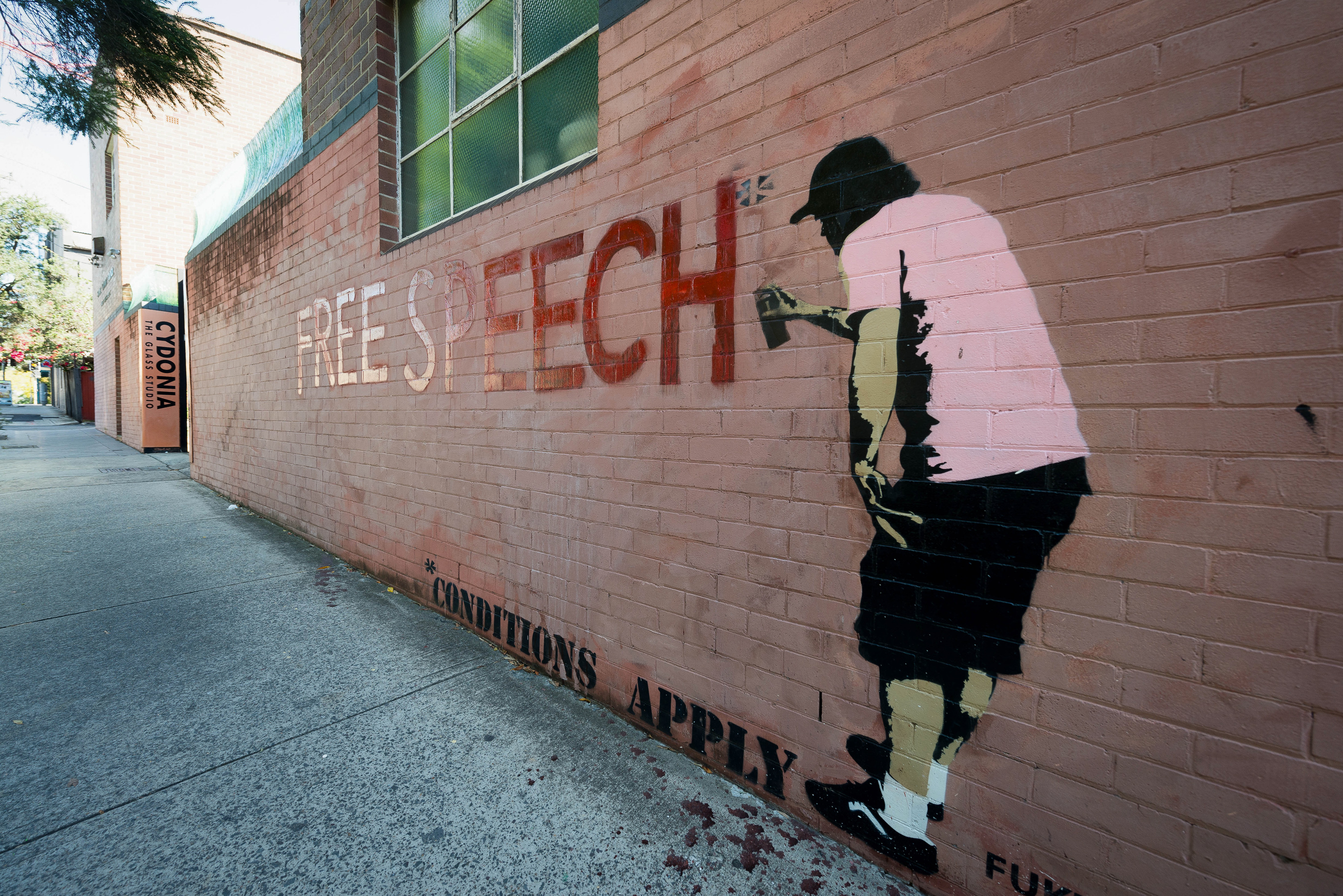
Free Speech Mural Witford Street, Enmore.

One of the most popular areas for graffiti and wall art is the industrial area near the Silo Apartments, bounded by Station Street, Enmore Road, Phillip Street and the railway. Many striking graffiti works can be seen on the various factory and warehouse walls along Gladstone Street, Wilford Street, Wilford Lane, Thurnby Lane and Phillip Lane. Some murals in this area have remained intact for several years while others typically last for only short periods before being tagged or overpainted.

Some of the most stylistically distinctive graffiti art works to appear in the Newtown area in recent times are the striking creations by the artist who signs his work "EMÖS". These highly intricate, semi-abstract bio-mechanical designs, executed by hand with spray paint, are all sited along Phillip Lane, behind Enmore Road; some are still visible in June 2007, although inevitably they are being progressively covered by the work of other graffiti artists, and the two examples, shown above second from left and centre, haves now been painted over. However, a number of similarly styled works by other artists, shown below, have appeared along Phillip Lane in recent weeks.

A piece of graffiti on or near Bedford Street (next to the railway line), which says "Cut me a line / of poetry, man." has been attributed to well-known local poet Benito Di Fonzo. People have claimed that he scribbled the piece to impress his then-girlfriend, local artist Joanne Patricia Shand (a.k.a. Jo Jo Rona). The line is featured in Di Fonzo's poem, "Cut Me a Line of Poetry". Another dedication to Patricia Shand exists in Erskineville that shows her with two dogs in a wall mural; however, the painter is unknown.

=== Camperdown Memorial Rest Park ===
One of the key locations for political and personal graffiti in the Newtown area is the long sandstone wall surrounding St Stephen's Church in Newtown. By the 1940s the cemetery was overgrown. In 1946 local girl Joan Norma Ginn was murdered and her body dumped in the cemetery, where it remained for several days before being found. This prompted action by the local council, which resulted in all but four acres being cleared and resumed as public space. An Act of Parliament in 1948 established the Camperdown Memorial Rest Park, under control of the local council. As a result, most of the gravestones were taken up and placed around the inside of the sandstone wall, although the graves were not disturbed and the depressions that mark their locations are still discernible.

Much of the graffiti on the wall around the church is brush-painted or spray-painted, and many are politically oriented slogans, although some stencil graffiti has appeared in recent times, and a number of striking large-scale mural works have been painted on walls and fences surrounding the park.

Although most of the graffiti is relatively recent, some examples have survived for many years. One venerable piece of brush-painted graffiti (above, second from left), which can be reliably dated to the mid-1970s and which is still partially visible, is the political slogan, "Is Frazer (sic) controlling your bowels?"—a reference to controversial 1970s Liberal Prime Minister Malcolm Fraser. A photograph of this slogan appeared in a 1976 book on Australian graffiti by photographer Rennie Ellis.

Other long-lasting pieces of handpainted graffiti on this wall, believed to be from the late 1970s or early 1980s, include the slogans "Patriarchy creates destruction" and "Hands held violently on to words that meant nothing" (above, far left). Another slogan remembered by some residents, was: "broken-hearted disillusioned desperates against meanness and nastiness, greed and stupidity."

Another significant location in Camperdown Park is the various rear walls and back fences of the buildings at the southern edge of the park that face onto Australia Street. A large continuous mural (above, centre) featuring many pictorial designs and elaborate tags, has been painted along the side wall of the large commercial building that faces the Courthouse Hotel, and most of the other fences and walls in this area of the park now have murals or decorative tags, although these have changed a number of times in recent years. The two examples above illustrate this—the mural second from right (photographed in March 2007) had been entirely painted over by July 2007 and replaced by the mural shown above, far right.

== Stencil graffiti ==
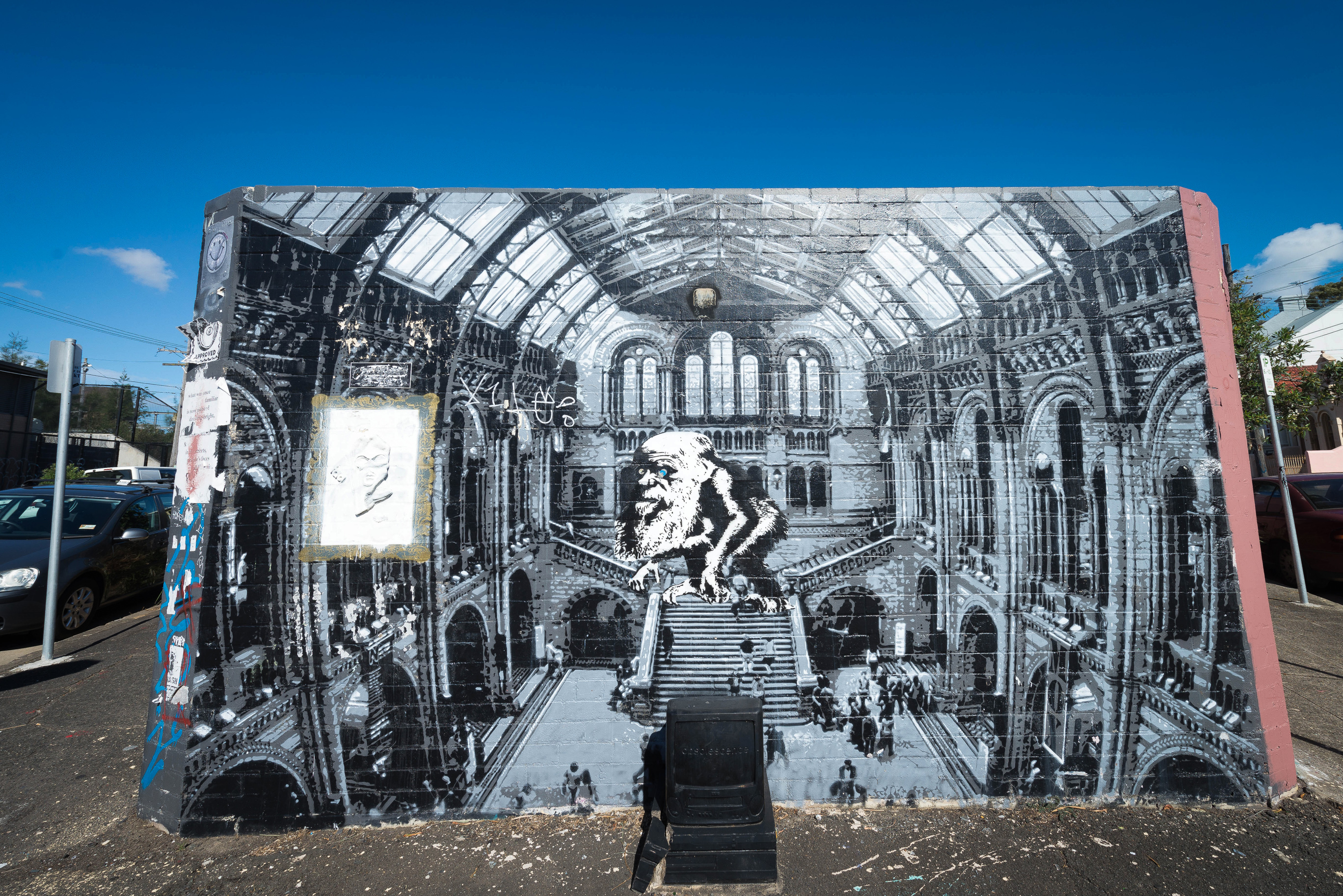
Natural History Museum mural. Sept. 2011

In the last few years, there has been a rapid proliferation of stencil graffiti around Newtown, with dozens of designs appearing on walls in the area during 2005–2006. This development reflects the growing popularity of this style in many international cities, and particularly in Melbourne, Victoria.

For about a decade years (ca. 2006–2016), the most notable location for stencil art in the Newtown area was the outer wall of the triangular property on the corner of Gladstone St and Phillip St in Enmore. The owners allowed graffiti to be applied as long as it was stencil art and from 2006 onwards dozens of stencil designs of all shapes and sizes were applied, and the collection grew. Artists on this wall included "KRAM", "Dam!", and "GlitaGirl". Ca. 2010 a plaster cast of a television and VCR (with the word "obsolescence" embossed on the screen) was installed on the footpath in front of the wall. The first version was vandalized and was soon replaced. In 2011, the stencil wall was completely over-painted with a large greyscale mural depicting the main foyer of the Natural History Museum in London. This mural, and the adjacent "Australiens" mural in Gladstone St, which survived for several years, were both subsequently overpainted. The future of this section of Newtown/Enmore as a venue for street art has been affected by the 2016 demolition of the building that originally stood here to make way for an apartment complex.

== Poster or 'Paste Up'/'Wheatpaste' graffiti and sticker art ==
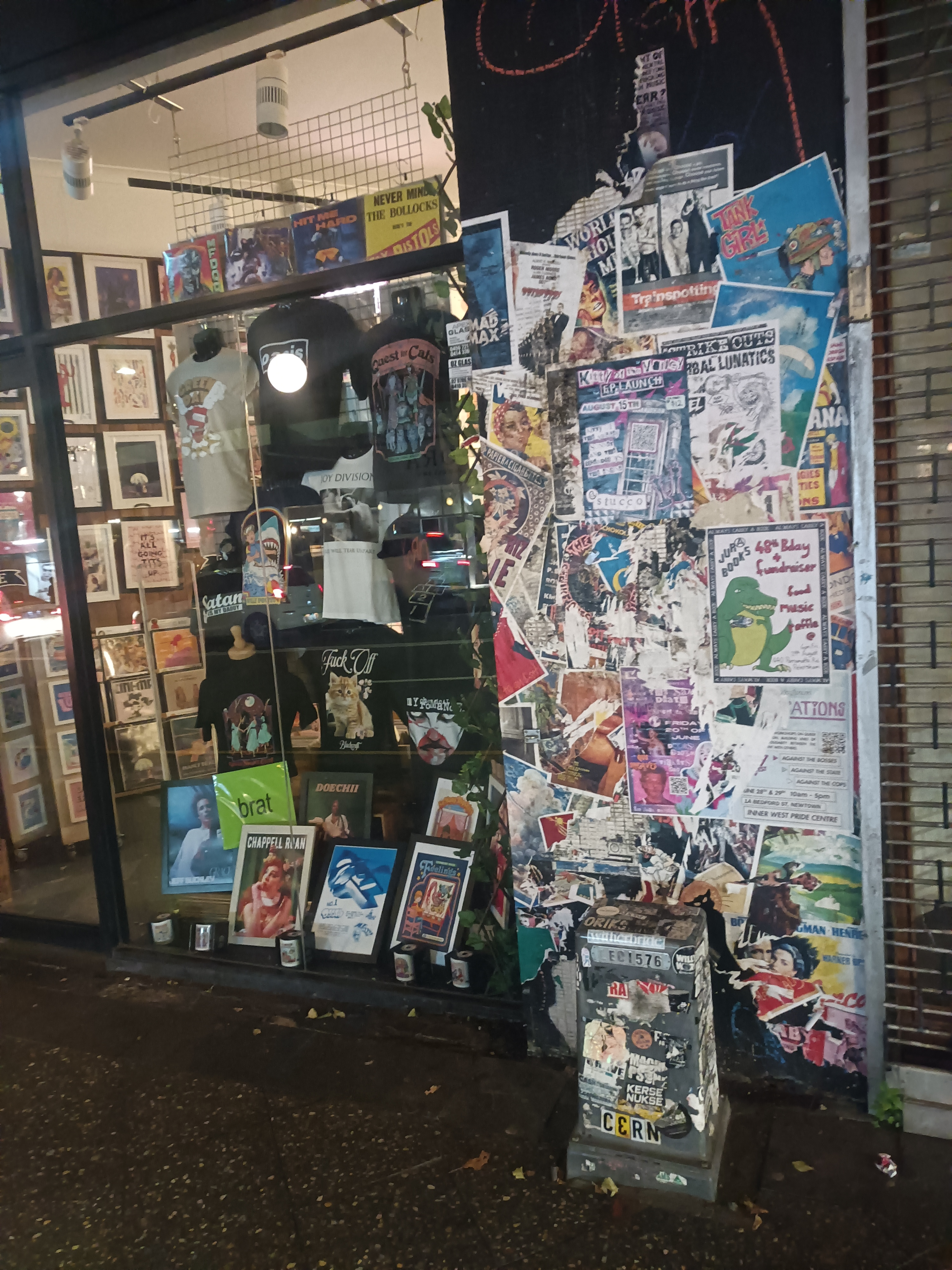
Film posters pasted to the outside of a business on King street Newtown. Posters promoting events have been added to the top of these film posters. 2025

Since the mid-2000s, innumerable examples of this new form of graphic street art have appeared in the Newtown area. Many small posters with graffiti graphics have been placed in various locations over the last few years, but these larger works — similar in scope to the many large poster graffiti works that have appeared in Melbourne in recent years — are a relatively recent development in Newtown.

Unlike the conventional painted designs and the recent popularity for stencil graffiti, these new works are essentially a form of poster art. Smaller designs are typically monochrome photocopies (some of which may be hand coloured) while others have been printed as self-adhesive stickers which are often affixed to roadside traffic signs.

Several large-format examples have appeared in 2007 such as the 'cartoon' figures pictured below, and the bus design, which was approximately a metre in length. Some, such as the octopus design from Gladstone St, appear to have been hand-painted or screen printed onto the backs of commercially printed street posters.

Sticker art is also commonly found on poles alongside roads, on the oustisde walls of businesses and on the backs of street signs, especially along King street.

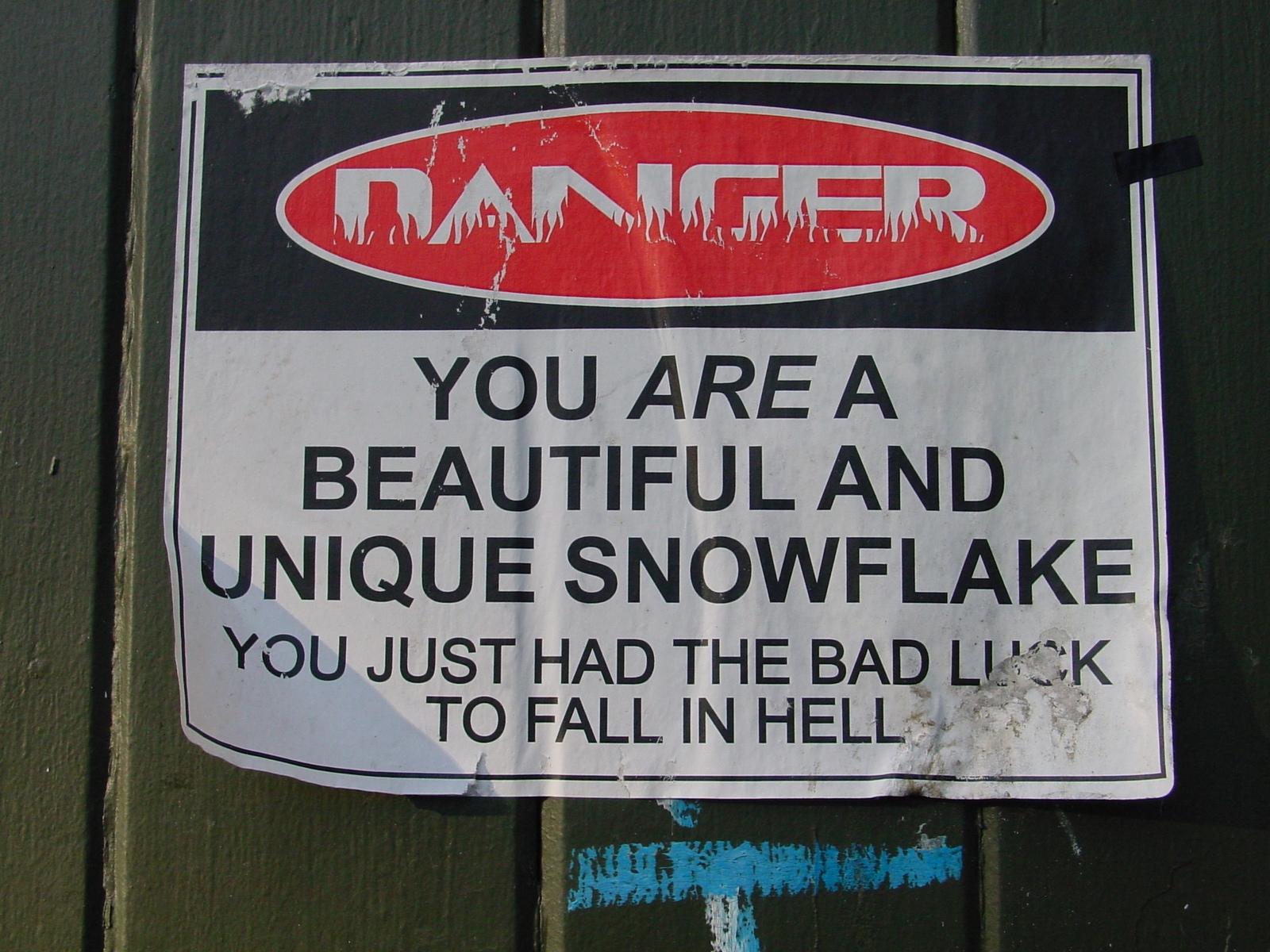
Poster graffiti, Newtown. 2007

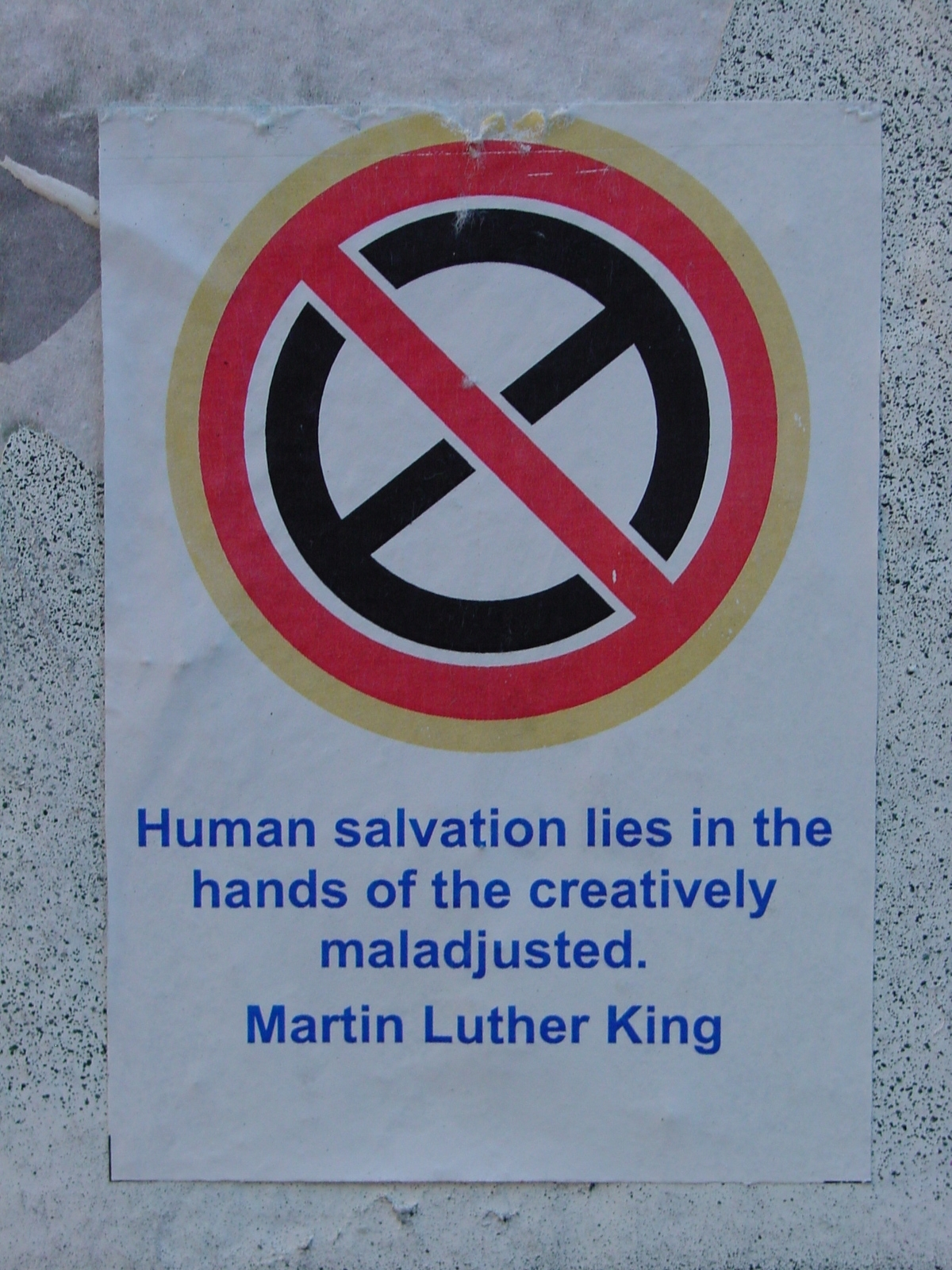
Poster graffiti, Newtown. 2007

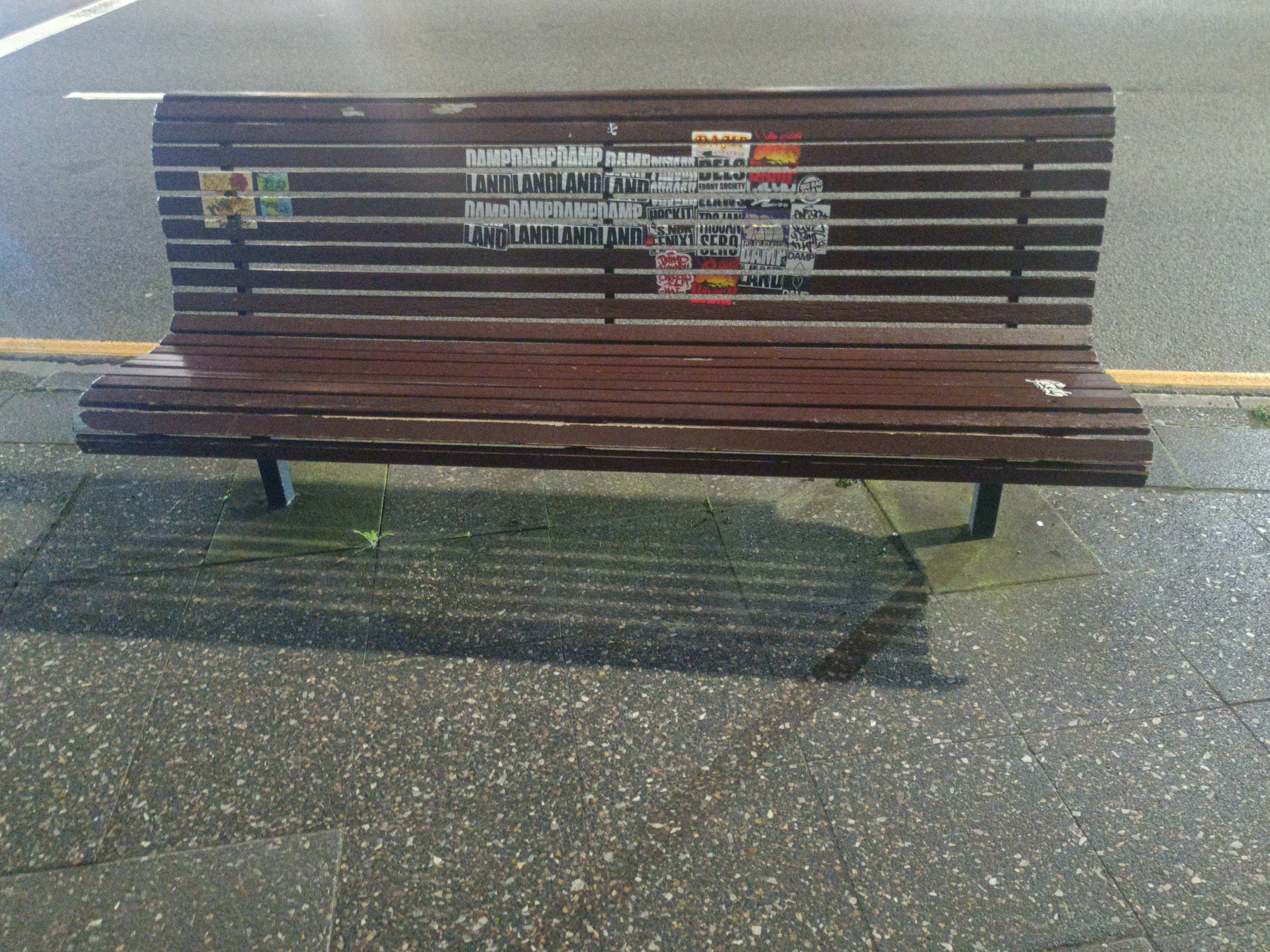
Sticker art on a bench on King st Newtown

== Perfect Match Program ==
In 2011, Marrickville Council and its successor the Inner West Council initiated the Perfect Match program to turn graffiti into Street Art. The Inner West Council initiative invited local property owners to find their Perfect Match by registering interest to have graffitied walls transformed by renowned street artists.

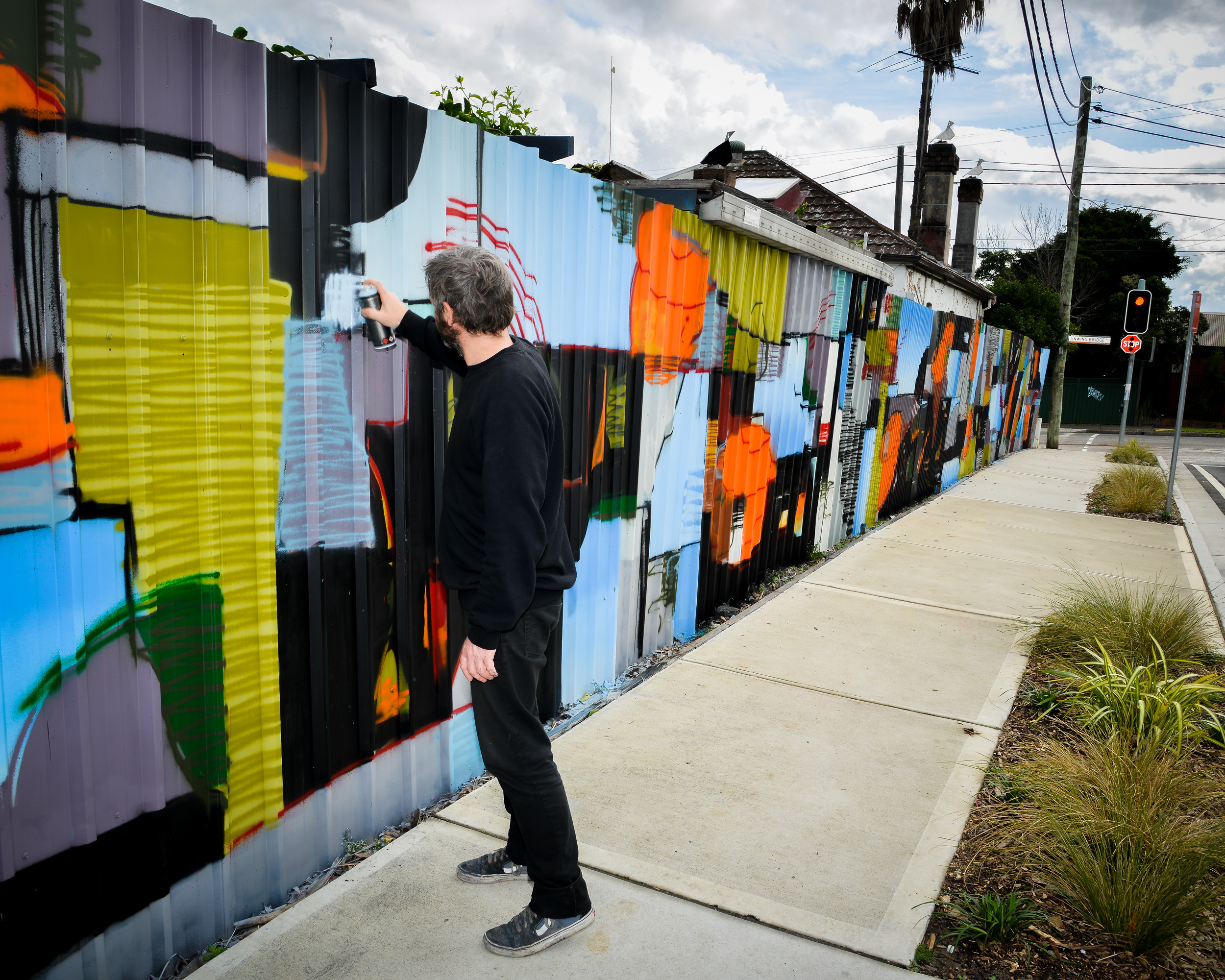
'SMC3', St Peters 2016

== Other media ==
Several novel street art developments have recently appeared in the Newtown area.

- Yarn bombing involves the creation of pieces of multi-coloured knitted fabrics, which are wrapped around objects such as trees and poles and stitched into place to create a colourful "sleeve". Around Newtown, this medium has typically taken the form of multi-coloured knitted piece which are stitched around the steel support poles of local road signs.
- The concrete graffiti style uses objects cast in concrete or a similar material, which are often glued into place on a footpath or against a wall. Around Newtown, many of these objects appear to have been created by the same artist, Will Coles, as a commentary on consumer culture. They have often been in the form of familiar items such as televisions and TV remote controls, and feature inscribed single-word slogans such as "fear" or "hate". These largest of these objects are the installations on King Street and on the corner of Gladstone Street, Enmore; both are full-scale replicas of a medium-size CRT television mounted on top of a replica VCR. The King Street object (now defaced by marker tags) is inscribed with the slogan "life is fleeting" and the Gladstone Street object with the word "obsolescence". Other concrete graffiti objects (such as those pictured above in May Street, St Peters) are partial representations of human-like faces, which appear to be based on medieval gargoyles.

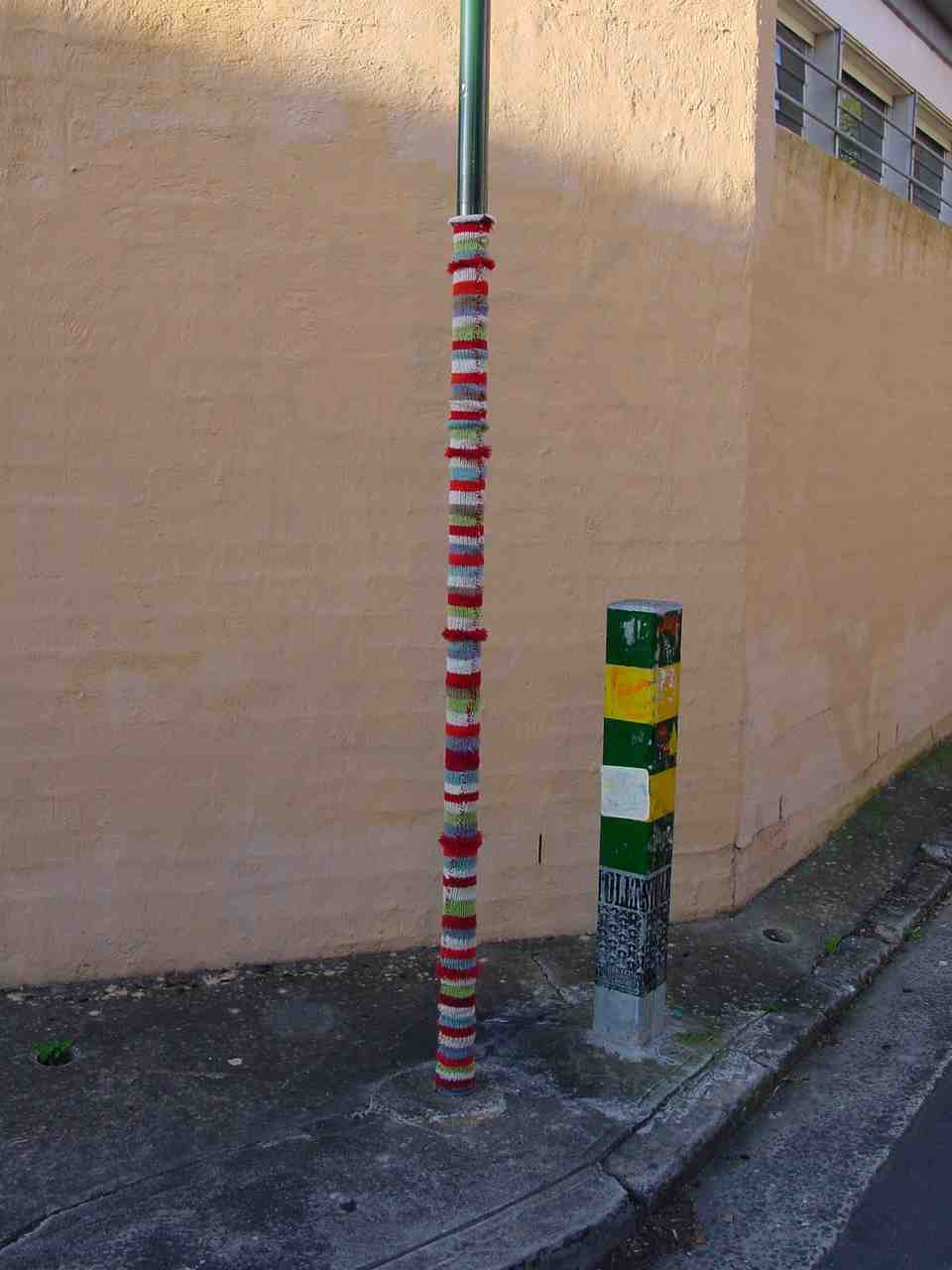
An example of yarn bombing, Enmore, NSW, 2009

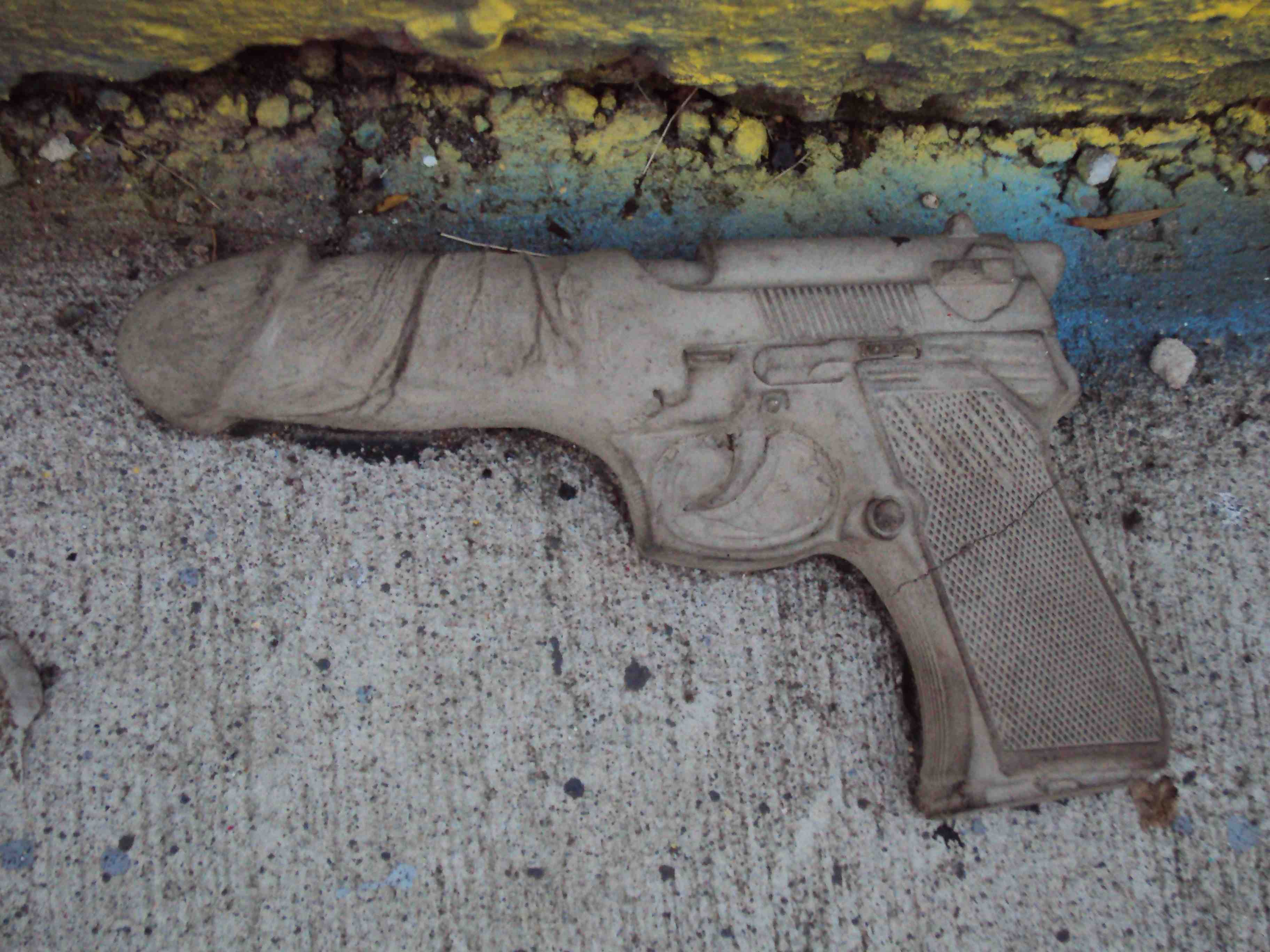
Concrete graffiti, May St, St Peters, NSW, 2011

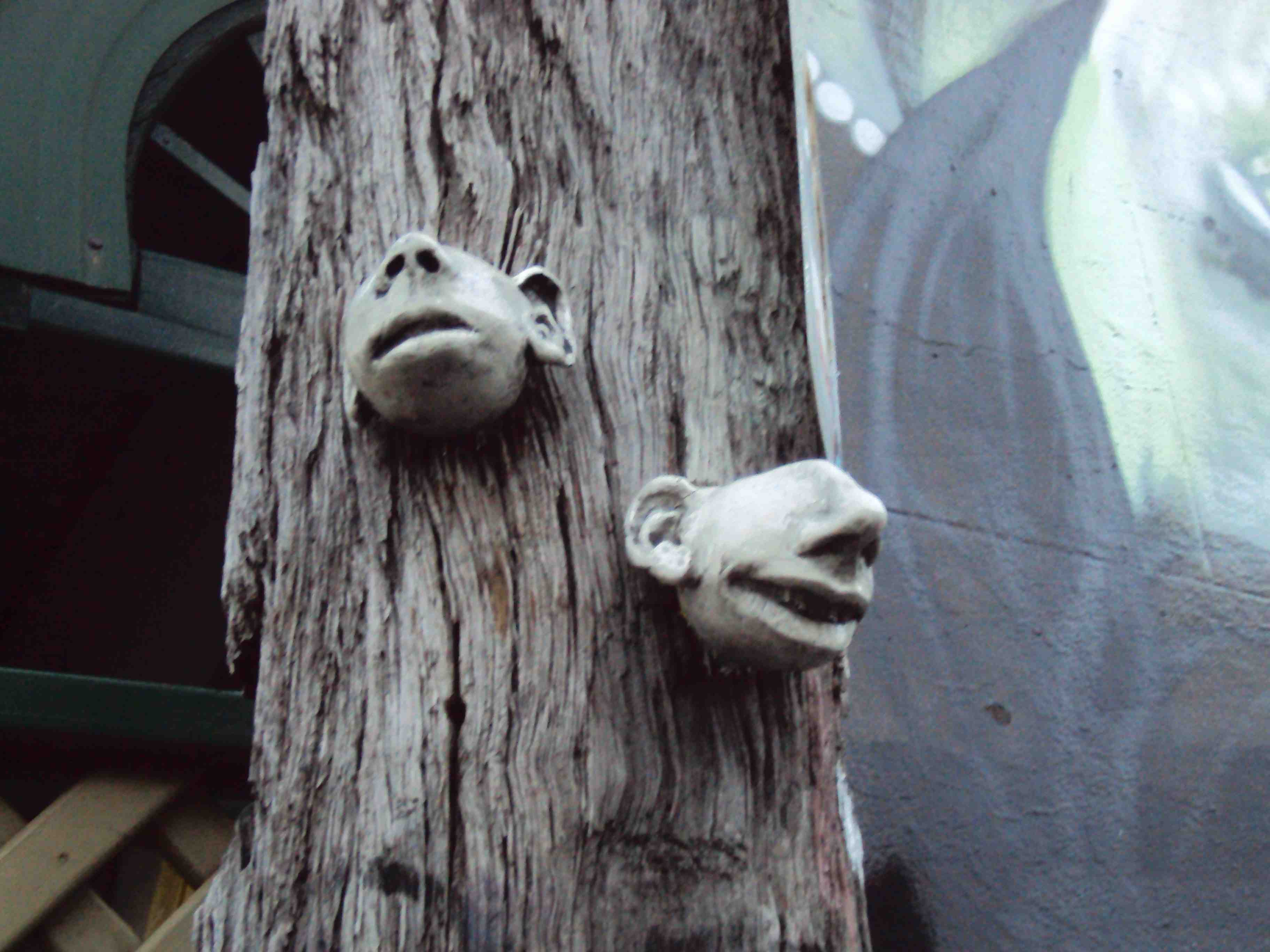
Concrete graffiti, May St, St Peters, NSW, 2011

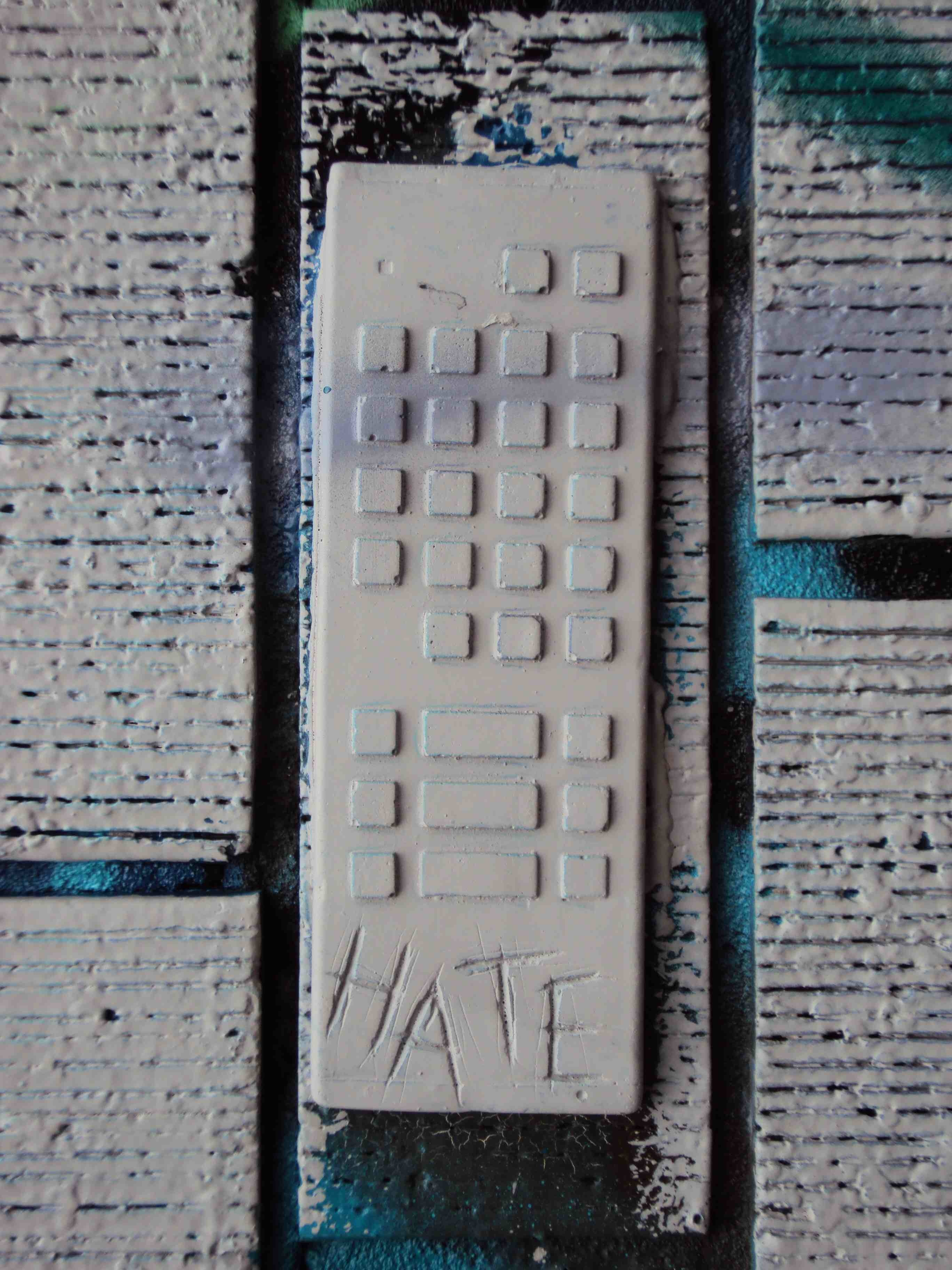
Concrete graffiti, May St, St Peters, NSW, 2011

== Works no longer extant ==
Below: four vanished Newtown murals – "Idiot Box", Erskineville Rd (photographed November 2006), a Jimi Hendrix portrait in Camperdown Memorial Rest Park (photographed July 2005) and a colourful Mayan-inspired mural (same location and date) and a mural in Goddard Lane (off King Street) photographed in January 2007.

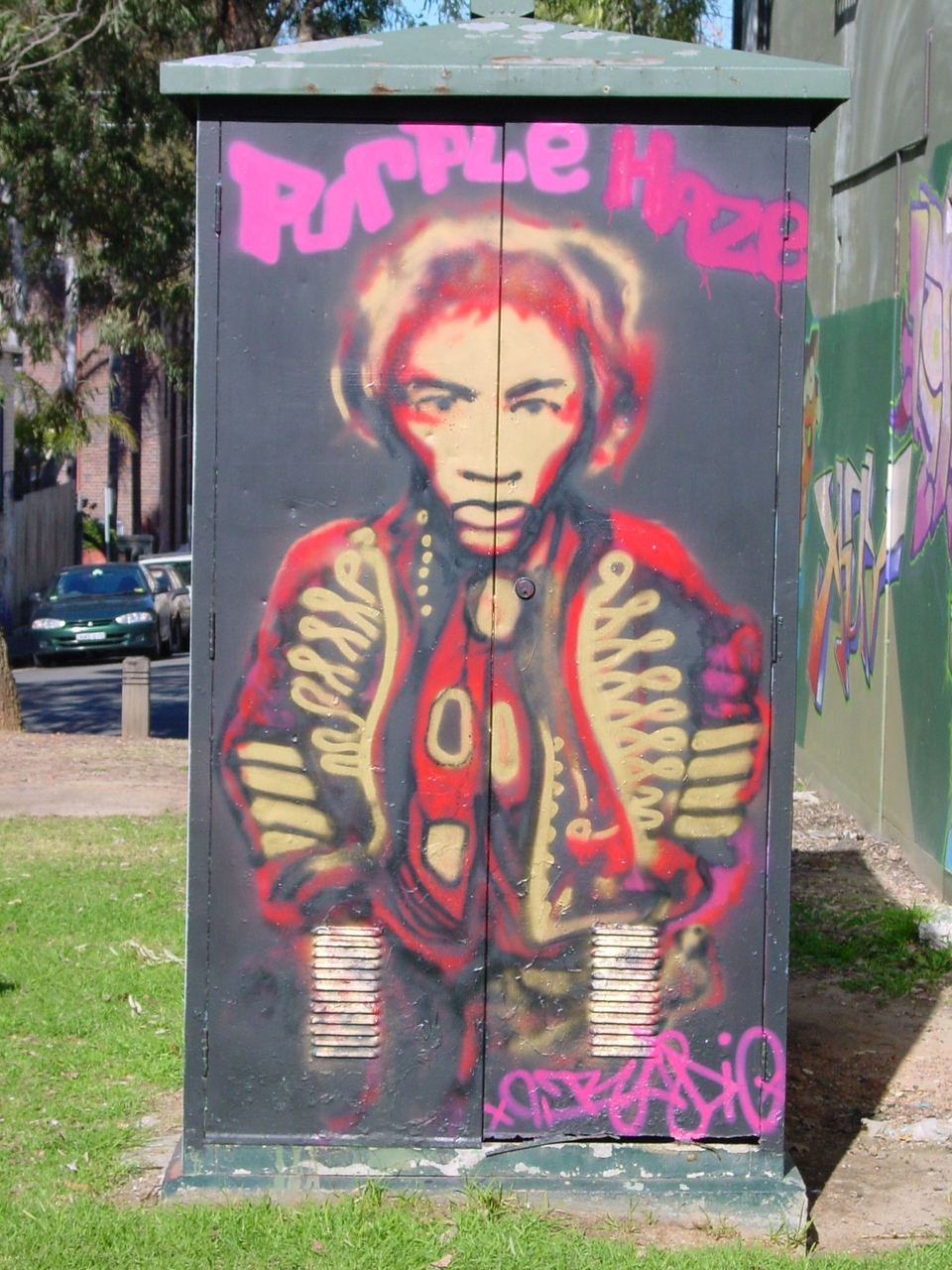
"Purple Haze"
(artist unknown)

A number of the largest works of street art in the Newtown area have been removed or painted over by the 21st century; including several large murals executed by Aiken, Pryor and others in the early to mid-1990s (formerly located along, or near, Erskineville Road).

For many years since the 1970s, a strip of land along both sides of Erskineville Road, extending east from King Street, was reserved by the Department of Main Roads as part of a plan to build a large arterial road through the area. This scheme was eventually abandoned after the imposition of Green Bans by the Builders Labourers Federation, which effectively stopped all work on the planned road; although, a number of shops and houses along the street were demolished. This struggle is now commemorated by Green Bans Park, located near the railway on Erskineville Road. The park is located on land that was formerly occupied by buildings that were demolished to make way for the proposed road.

Prominent street art pieces and large murals that are no longer extant include:

=== Erskineville Road ===
- Newtown PCYC – the group of mural images, executed by Unmitigated Audacity Productions in June–July 1995, were painted on the outside of the former Newtown Police Citizens Youth Club building on Erskineville Road. This is presumed to have been a legal project, and like the "Herald" mural in King Street, these images were evidently created by painting (at night) with the use of projected images. There were numerous panels of pictures and text, including portraits of TV characters Sonny Hammond and Skippy, from the 1960s Australian TV series Skippy the Bush Kangaroo, an image of Mr. Spock from Star Trek, a stock image of two laughing European peasant women, and a reproduction of a photograph of 1980s Sydney identity the late Sallie-Anne Huckstepp. These images were still extant until October 2013, although, the building had been unused for a number of years, has been partially damaged by fire and for several years was surrounded by a metal hoarding. The Newtown PCYC was demolished in early November 2013 for the construction of a new apartment complex, resulting in the destruction of all murals.

"Idiot Box" mural, Erskineville Rd (no longer extant)

- The popular "Idiot Box" mural that was created by Unmitigated Audacity Productions. The mural was located on the side wall of a large terrace house at 64 Erskineville Road, opposite the renowned Imperial Hotel. It featured a surrealistic portrait of the television character, Marcia Brady, from The Brady Bunch, brandishing an automatic pistol; the mural was painted as if she was bursting through the shattering glass of a television screen. The TV itself is painted in a trompe l'oeil effect, apparently breaking through the brick wall of the house on which the mural is painted. The power switch and power cord and plug of the TV were applied objects made from plastic. This significant mural, which had been in place since 1993, was removed by the then owners of the property in November/December 2006.
- The Felix the Cat and Cat in the Hat murals. The murals were painted on the sides of two houses near the intersection of Erskineville Road and Wilson Street. These houses originally faced onto a council carpark that had been opened up by the demolition of the terrace that originally stood there. These murals were obscured by the construction of a large block of apartments on the site in the late 1990s. An image of the "Cat In The Hat" mural, taken by Ben Apfelbaum in 1990, can be viewed here.
- The Miles Davis mural "On the Wings of a Song" by Andrew Aiken and Matthew Peet. This was painted on the side of a house adjacent to the Mrs Mollie Swift Reserve on Erskineville Road. It depicted jazz musicians Miles Davis and John Coltrane with a rainbow and music notes flowing out from the bells of their instruments. This mural was erased/painted over in the early 2000s.
- A mural dedicated to John Coltrane, similar in style to the "Wings" mural but much smaller in size, was painted on the wall a now-defunct laundry business located on the corner of King and Egan streets. This mural (thought to be painted by Unmitigated Audacity Productions) was removed ca. 2002.
- A figurative mural in Goddard Lane (off King St near the Newtown High School of the Performing Arts) which features distinctive depictions of a spray-can, a cat and a fish (probably by Phibs); this mural was painted over with a new design in Feb. 2008.

== Commercialisation ==
In mid-2009, artists associated with Sydney company, "Mr Perso & Detch", to execute a commissioned "guerilla" graffiti campaign on behalf of Warner Music to promote the album, 21st Century Breakdown, by American rock band, Green Day. The campaign included large painted images in several locations in Newtown and Surry Hills, and the painting of approximately eighty stencils in skate parks around the Sydney city area. The large images depicted the artwork and title of the album; however, at least two of the Newtown murals were soon defaced as a protest by locals, who sprayed over the slogan "CA$h Cow". Sydney City Council, which has incorporated policies aimed at discouraging "graffiti", was reported to be investigating the matter.

Protest graffiti continues in 2018 with the defacing of Coca-Cola advertising on the railway bridge, Enmore Rd, Newtown. The advert, a commercial stencil transfer, drew attention from locals opposed to corporations including Coca-Cola Amatil using Newtown spaces for product advertising. Social media proved a hotbed for discussion on the matter with deep divisions of people posting both support for the defacing and others defending the ad.
