= Robert Kantor (sculptor) =

American lawyer and sculptor

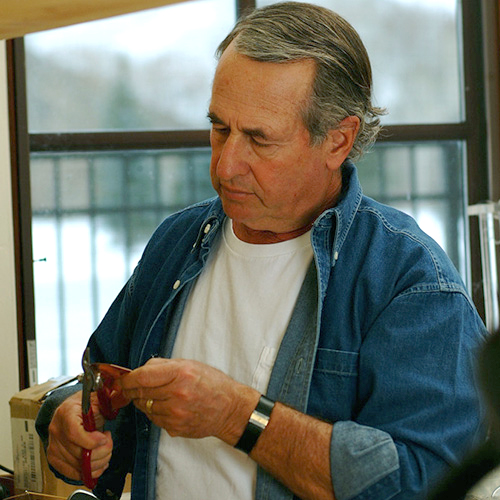
- Born: February 13, 1943 (age 83); New York, NY, U.S.
- Education: University of Colorado, Southern Methodist University
- Known for: Sculpture
- Movement: Kinetic art, Abstraction (art)

Robert Aron Kantor (born February 13, 1943) is an American sculptor and attorney.

As an artist, Kantor’s work focuses on large scale steel structures and mobile (kinetic) sculpture. He has two large sculptures on permanent installation at Boise State University, and one at a medical center in Napa, California.

As an attorney working as a sole practitioner and with the American Civil Liberties Union in 1971-2, he represented street artists arrested in San Francisco, eventually negotiating a resolution allowing the artists to display their work at specific locations. He co-founded a law firm and several real estate ventures.

== Early life and education ==
Kantor was born in New York, NY and grew up in Dallas, TX. He graduated from University of Colorado at Boulder, where he studied literature and art history. He was awarded a graduate fellowship at New York University. In 1969, he earned a Juris Doctor degree from Southern Methodist University School of Law, and then appointed as a clerk for the United States Court of Appeals for the 9th Circuit in San Francisco.

== Career ==
=== Art ===
Living in the 1960s in New York, Kantor was influenced by the work of mobile sculptor Alexander Calder and began making his own mobile sculptures. He completed his first kinetic sculpture, entitled Don Quixote, in 1965.

He started focusing on large-scale sculpture and opened a welding shop in the 1990s. Kantor’s piece God’s Promise, the Mobile was put on permanent display in 2004 at the Napa Valley Vintners Community Health Center charity hospital in Napa Valley. The eight feet by nineteen feet painted steel mobile consists of geometric shapes.

Kantor’s outdoor sculpture Rising Star of Boise State became a permanent outdoor installation in 2004 at Boise State University. The red steel sculpture has a mobile attached to its crest. The mobile consists of two geometric flat figures attached to either end of a rod mounted to the star’s crest almost like a weather vane; one of the figures is painted yellow and the other is painted blue.

The red steel sculpture has a mobile attached to its crest. The mobile consists of two geometric flat figures attached to either end of a rod mounted to the star’s crest almost like a weather vane; one of the figures is painted yellow and the other is painted blue. Kantor’s Hope Series was exhibited in 2006 at the Center on Contemporary Art (CoCA), a public museum in Seattle. The Hope Series consisted of three abstract sculptures. The first, Camp Hope, represents an early concentration camp fence, spans approximately nine feet, and is made of wooden posts, twisted barbed wire, and small glass butterflies, all on a steel base. Hope 2 is a rusted and hollowed out metal bomb with small plaster and glass butterflies on its surface and held up by a pole mounted to a steel base. Hope 3 is a paravene with an army helmet resting on its top along with small butterflies. The art historian and critic Daniel Kany, who wrote a book on Robert Kantor’s work and the exhibit identifies themes of war, the Holocaust, and memory in the series, but also themes of hope and overcoming. The Hope exhibit was also on display in the museum area of Boise State University.

In 2018, Kantor’s “The White Flower,” an 18 foot tall 220 pound indoor mobile, became a permanent installation at Boise State University.

=== Law career ===
In 1971 and 1972, as an attorney in San Francisco he represented street artists who had been arrested for selling their art without permit which the police department refused to issue. Kantor then obtained an injunction against the city and county who had stopped the artists. Following the injunction, in affiliation with the ACLU, he negotiated a resolution which led to the licensing of the street artists.

After local merchants pressured police and city licensing authorities to prohibit sidewalk vending, Kantor negotiated a licensing resolution providing a mechanism for artists to obtain licenses and allot them locations to sell their wares.

Kantor co-founded the tax law firm Kantor & Wolf in 1974.

=== Investor and real estate developer ===
In 1976, Kantor and his partners owned the U.S. distribution rights to the Italian film Seven Beauties, which received three Academy Award nominations. He was also an executive producer of the 1976 Jodie Foster and Martin Sheen movie The Little Girl Who Lived Down the Lane.

In the 1980s, Kantor invested in and managed real estate developments. He and his partners purchased, redeveloped, and sold historic properties in Oakland in 1981, in Tacoma, Washington in 1985, and in Seattle in 1988, including the iconic Smith Tower. Kantor developed two properties in Honolulu in 1989 with his company Rokan.

Kantor was a primary Designer and co-founder of The National Philanthropic Trust in 1997 (NPT); NPT is one of the largest managers of donor-advised funds in the nation with about $6.2 billion in assets in 2020.

Kantor co-founded Headwater Capital in 2016, a real estate investment firm based in Ketchum, Idaho.
