= List of stencil artists =

The stencil artists listed below are grouped by country of origin. Many are identified with stencil graffiti, while some are also associated with street poster art, screenprinting, mural painting, installations, or art intervention.

== Notable stencil artists (by country of origin) ==
Notable stencil artists include:

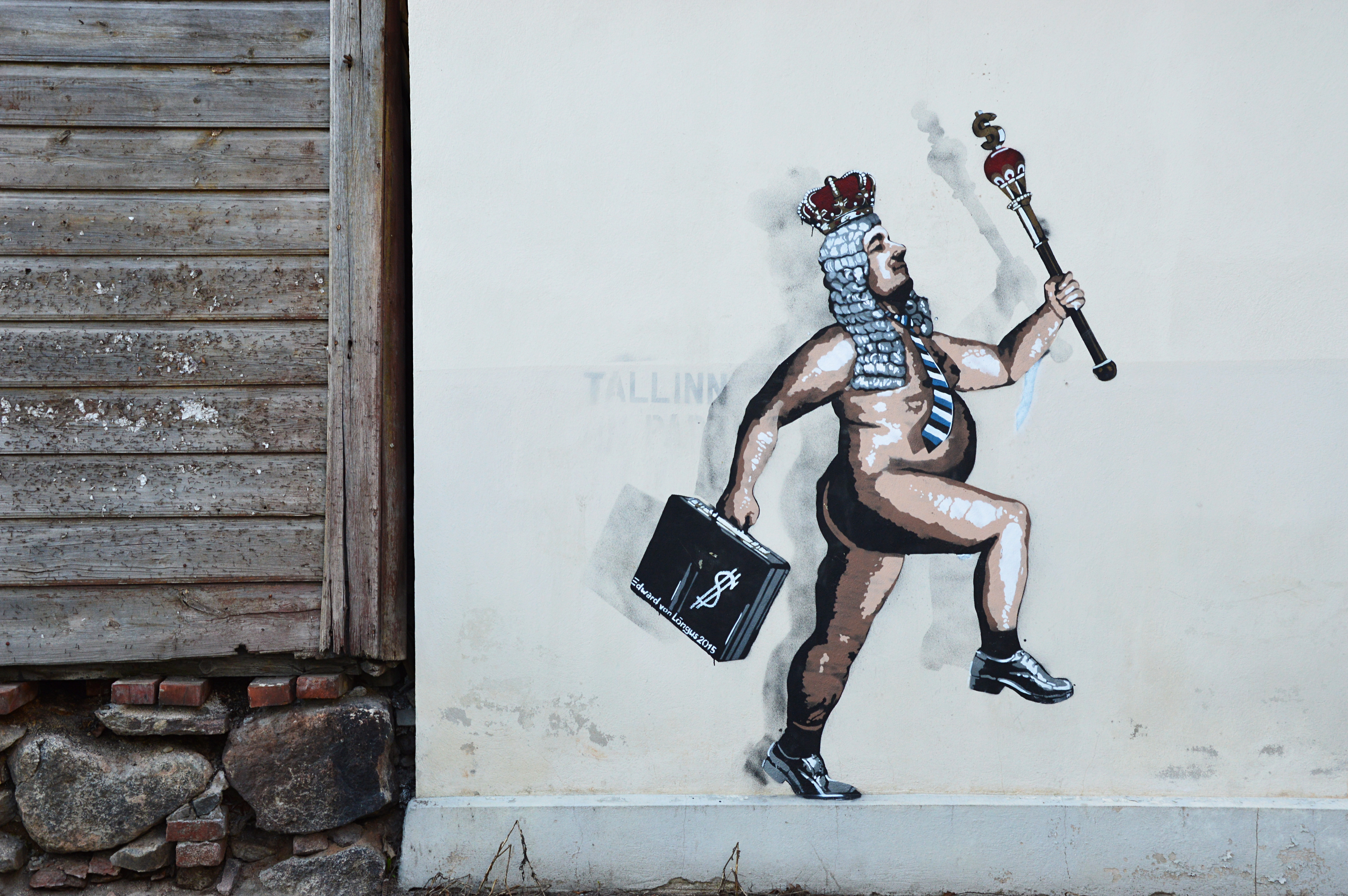
"The naked emperor" by Estonian stencil artist Edward von Lõngus in Tartu

=== Australia ===
- Civilian (Australia) - stencil graffiti
- Meek (Australia) - stencil graffiti

=== Brazil ===
- Alex Vallauri - stencil graffiti

=== Canada ===
- Posterchild (Canada) - stencil graffiti, street poster art

=== Estonia ===
- Edward von Lõngus (Estonia) - stencil graffiti

=== France ===
- Blek le Rat (France) - stencil graffiti, art intervention
- C215 (France) - stencil graffiti
- Miss Tic (France) - stencil graffiti
- Jef Aerosol (France) - stencil graffiti

=== Germany ===
- van Ray (Germany) - stencil graffiti

=== Italy ===
- Sten Lex (Italy) - stencil graffiti
- kocore (Italy) - stencil graffiti
- Lucamaleonte (Italy) - stencil graffiti
- Jbrock (Italy) - stencil graffiti

=== Norway ===
- Dolk (Norway) - stencil graffiti, graffiti
- DOT DOT DOT (Norway) - stencil graffiti, graffiti
- Pøbel (Norway) - stencil graffiti, graffiti

=== Netherlands ===
- Tinker Brothers (Netherlands)
- Hugo Kaagman (Netherlands)

=== United Kingdom ===
- Banksy (UK) - stencil graffiti, art intervention
- D.N.Z (UK) - stencil graffiti, art, London
- JPS (UK) - stencil graffiti, art, Weston-Super-Mare
- 909 Art (UK) - stencil graffiti, art, Kettering

=== Switzerland ===
- NEVERCREW (CH) - stencil graffiti, mural paintings, installations, art intervention

=== United States ===
- Tavar Zawacki f.k.a. 'ABOVE' (United States) - stencil graffiti, art intervention, screenprinting
- Faile (USA/Canada/Japan) - stencil graffiti, street poster art, screenprinting
- Ray Ferrer (USA) - spray paint, hand-cut stencils
- Josh MacPhee (USA) - stencil graffiti, street poster art, screenprinting
- Scott Williams (USA)
- Christopher Wool (USA)
- Shepard Fairey (USA) - stencil graffiti, street poster art, screenprinting, political art
- WRDSMTH (USA) - stencil graffiti, street poster art, poetry
