= Kurar =

KURAR
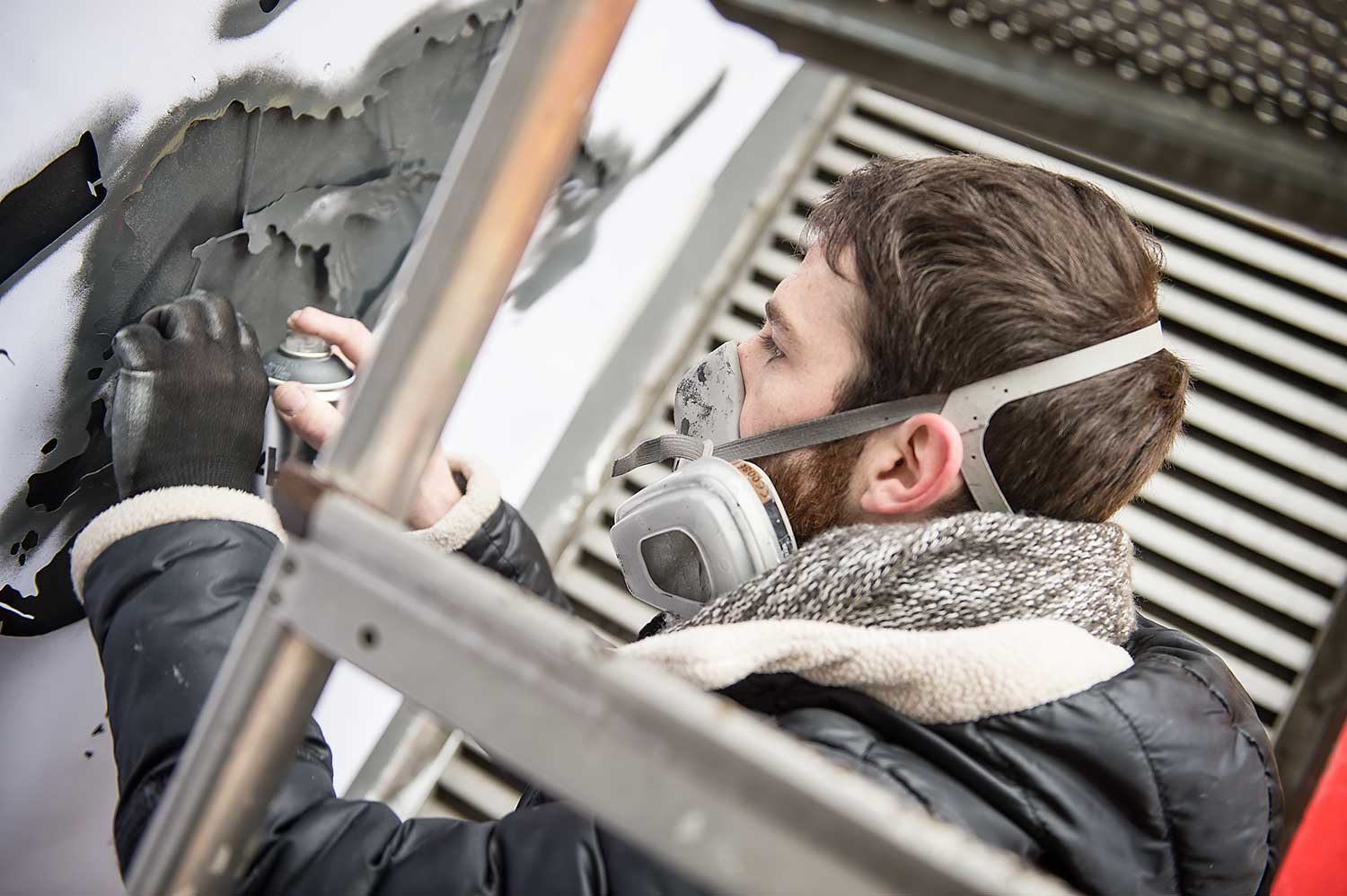
- Kurar in 2015
- Born: Descours Aurélien; 1983 (age 42–43); Clermont-Ferrand, France
- Known for: Graffiti, street art, social commentary, stencil art, fine art
- Notable work: Dangerous Game; And the Light Is; BP Summertime Job; Unelementary Evolution; Save my World
- Movement: Graffiti, street art, Urban art,
- Website: kurar.fr

Kurar is the pseudonym of a French artist whose work often addresses complex social issues such as post-urbanization, climate change, terrorism, and violence in local and global terms. In his practice, the artist highlights the important ideas and details by utilizing contrast, mainly between gray, black and fluorescent colors to make the subject and messages of the piece come out intensely. His witty and clever artworks have been included in numerous individual and collective shows worldwide.

== Life and career ==
Born in 1983 in France’s city Clermont-Ferrand, Kurar started to have a genuine interest in graffiti in the early 2000s, at a time when we couldn’t have talked about a street art scene, in France or anywhere else. There was no art market as we know it today nor any street artist’s exhibitions. It was all about the passion that the artists shared with friends. Kurar used to paint in brownfield sites for the space that allowed him to realize wall frescoes. Although he is today best known for his stencil art, the mysterious creative did not immediately start painting with stencils. At first, Kurar worked on 3D lettering, but over the years, he developed his distinctive stenciling techniques in order to express more concrete ideas in a different format.

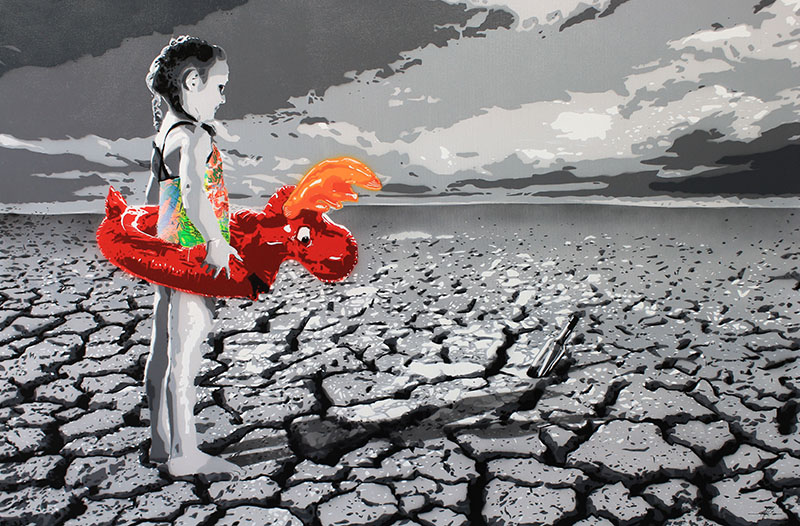
"S.O.S" / 2017

He lives and works in Paris. In the 1990s Kurar started graffiti art as an amateur, parallel to his studies. After improving his graffiti skills over many years, he focused on stencil art. Kurar first exhibited his works in France. As his popularity grew, he began to have exhibitions in Europe and eventually, all over the world. The first exclusive auction of his art took place in Cornette de Saint Cyr (Paris, France).

Kurar has worked in collaboration with commercial brands. His collaboration with the luggage brand Eastpak consisted of customizing products, specifically a range of bags, which were later auctioned.

Kurar uses stencil art to express his opinion of the world that he forms from the daily life around him. His work reflects ideas of modern society, war, religion and consumerism. His work includes contrasting elements of humour and subtlety.

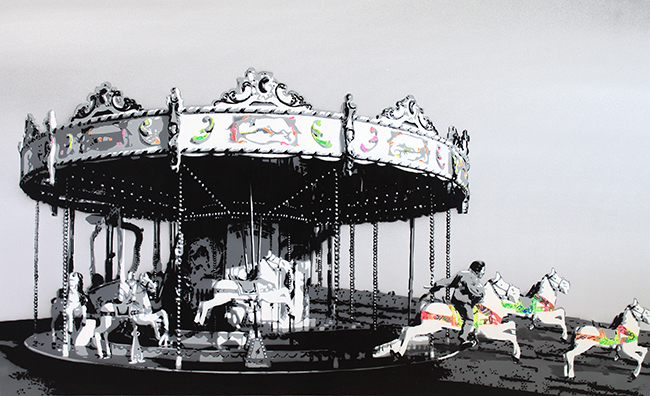
Liberty / 2017

== Techniques ==
Kurar is a stencil graffiti artist and he belongs to the international street art movement. His techniques include fresco, stencil and collage. He uses contrast, mainly between grey, black and fluorescent colors, to highlight the important ideas and details in his works

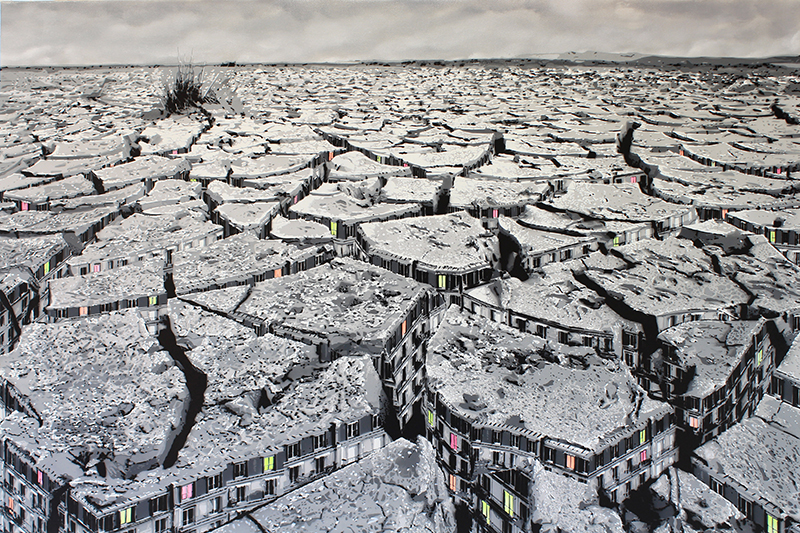
"Surbanisation part II" / 2018

Over the years, Kurar has developed his stencil techniques in order to express more complex ideas restructured in a more logical and readable format. He uses stencils to express his opinion of the world around us, especially focusing on economic, political and social problems with an emphasis on the evolution of our societies through the decades. Believing that art is a testimony of our history, of our traditions and of our values, Kurar portrays these dysfunctions within a global and artistic approach. He fearlessly tackles some sensitive issues that the world deals with today, and he does it with a pinch of humor and in the manner of an effective wake-up call to our culture and society. In his work, Kurar tackles some sensitive issues that the world deals with today.

== Political and social themes ==
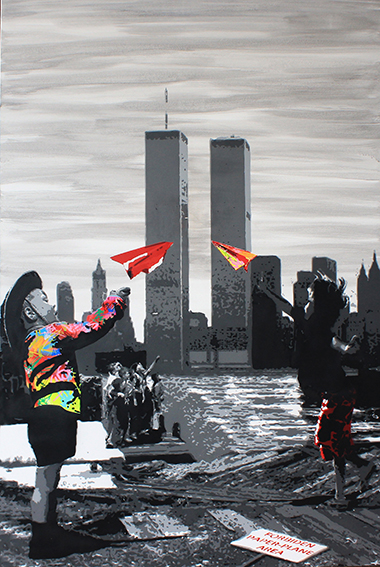
"Dangerous Game" / 2014

Kurar’s aim is to demonstrate his opinion on modern society (modernity). Inspired by the visions and atmosphere of the 1930s, he wants to create a link with the current period. He highlights the changes that people undergo due to the contemporary world and its environment. He wants to put the stress on the excess, the coldness and the individualism that characterize our era. Kurar is socially and politically committed. He is inspired by the social issues which he finds to be very important. Subjects that Kurar dwells upon are war, religion and consumerism. He wants to deliver a message of hope by using poetry, humor and provocation. The symbol that Kurar uses most often is infancy, which represents innocence, the beginning of something new and the perpetuity of humans. He found it an effective way to pass his messages, due to the contrast that children create, which are linked with current events and the problems that society faces today.

== Children in Kurar’s Artworks ==
The main subjects in Kurar’s pieces are children often surrounded by weapon, chains, or symbols of modern age like computers, or shopping bags. He brilliantly uses the symbol of innocence to contrast with the satirical and provocative aspect of these representations and, simultaneously, to emphasize the message and its effects like in his mural entitled And the Light is… (also known as A Girl & TV) painted in Berlin, Germany for Urban Nation group show. Featuring a girl captivated by interesting content on television, we see both the negative and critical side of the piece as well as the artist’s sense of humor and his undoubted talent. And the Light is… (A Girl & TV) was included in Widewalls selection of top 100 murals, painted on the walls across the globe by the world’s leading street and urban artist, during the one hundred weeks starting from 2013 when the magazine was established.

== The phenomenon of television ==
On 2016 he work on a series of paintings, custom castings, objects, and installations revolves around the topic of TV and the way it is still an inescapable, ubiquitous factor of our everyday life. TV Rules Your Life was the title of the solo shows that was on view at Next Street Gallery in Paris in March 2016. His work was also included in numerous individual and collective shows in such countries as Spain, Singapore, Germany, and the United States.
