= DNZ =

DNZ may refer to:

- Democratic People's Union (Demokratska narodna zajednica), political party in Bosnia and Herzegovina
- Denizli Çardak Airport, Turkey (by IATA code)
- Destination New Zealand, tourism television program
- Deutsche National Zeitung, German extreme-right newspaper
- Die Neue Zeit, socialist theoretical journal
- Saudi–Kuwaiti neutral zone (Divided [Neutral] Zone)
- DNZ (artist), British artist
