= Tinker Brothers =

Graphic artists

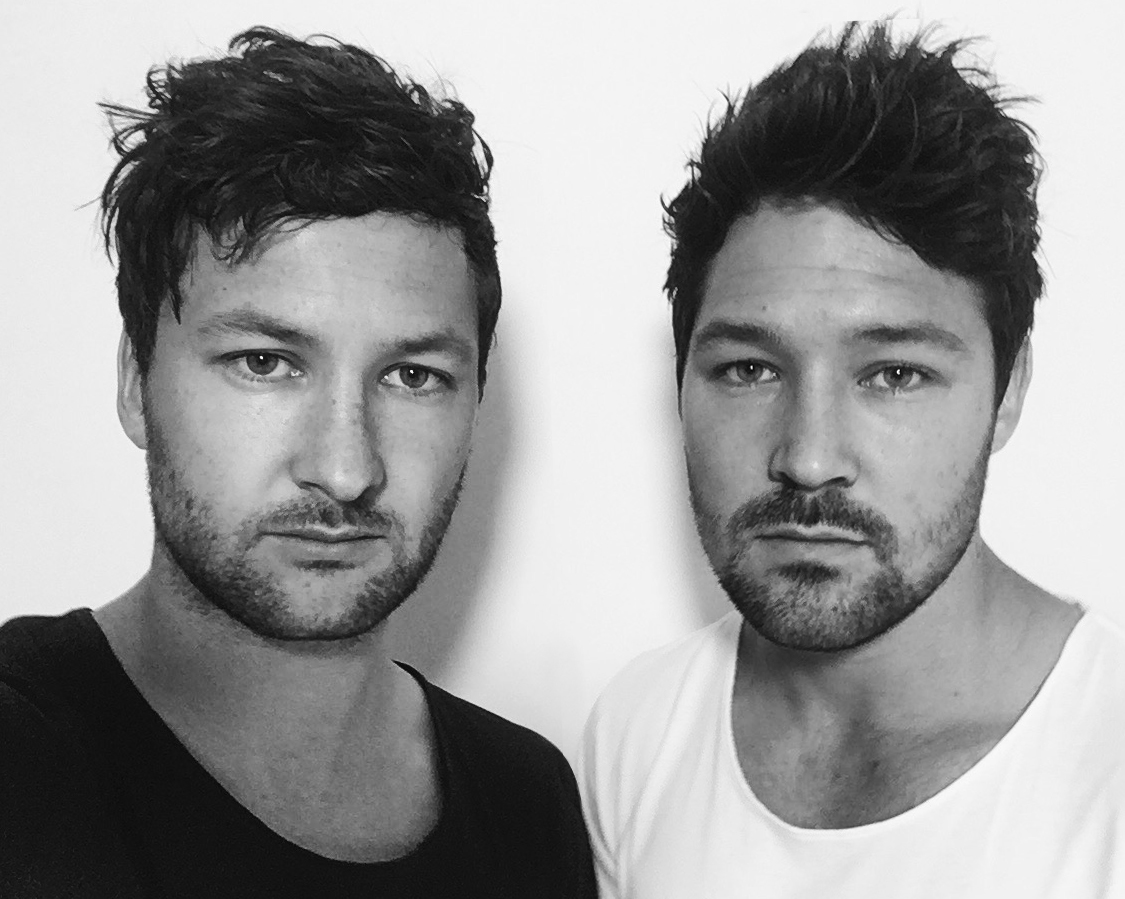
- The Tinker Brothers in 2017
- Born: Helmond, Netherlands
- Known for: Pop art; stencil graffiti

The Tinker Brothers are stencil artists from the Netherlands. They are known for their signature style of invisible paintings.

== Life and work ==
In 2012, they dropped out of their respective studies at the University of Applied Sciences and the University of Technology and quit their jobs to fulfill their dream of becoming artists. They spent the next few years experimenting with different techniques and media.

The brothers signature style of stencil art as a technique uses a minimalismstic style.
