= Sprayprinter =

Device for printing images onto a wall

SprayPrinter is a device that attaches to aerosol paint cans whereby users can print images via Bluetooth from a smartphone onto a wall or almost any surface.

== History ==
The technology behind SprayPrinter was developed by Mihkel Joala. He explained in a 2016 interview with New Atlas that his idea was inspired by the modern car engine and the Nintendo Wii console. "Engines nowadays use extremely fast valves to spray fuel to [the] combustion chamber," says Joala. "I realized I can use them to shoot paint with pinpoint accuracy."

As of December 2021, the company appears to be no longer selling products.

== Awards and Recognitions ==
In 2015, SprayPrinter received €8,000 from the Estonian prototyping contest Prototron for its initial prototype.

In 2016, the SprayPrinter team won the grand prize of €30,000 from the televised pitching competition Ajujaht.
