= AME72 =

English graffiti artist (born 1972)

James Ame
- Born: 1972 (age 53–54)
- Known for: stencil art and graffiti of a Lego caracther
- Style: Street art, stencil art, Pop art

AME72 is the alias of James Ame, a British stencil and graffiti artist. His works are characterized by the repeated use of Lego figures.

AME72 was born in England in 1972, and started doing graffiti in 1985.

According to him, the repeated use of the theme of the Lego character is related to nostalgia - In his childhood his father decided not to purchase a new television set after the old one broke down, and he found himself playing a lot of the popular assembly game.

His works are linked to the pop art movement and deal with social issues such as consumerism and commercialization. However, they are also characterized by an optimistic and humorous view. For the most part, he works in a combination of freehand technique and stencils. Ame has many works around the world, among others in Great Britain and Israel. His works were exhibited in museums and galleries, including contemporary art museums in Tel Aviv, Haifa, and Beijing, and were sold in auction houses such as Dreweatts Neate Fine Art Auction Group and Bonhams Fine Art Auctioneers & Valuers.

In 2019 he won the Guinness World Records for the largest work of art executed using the technique of stencil. The work, known as 'The Maze', measures 267.74 square meters, and was placed at the Elma Arts Hotel in Zikhron Ya'akov.

== Gallery ==
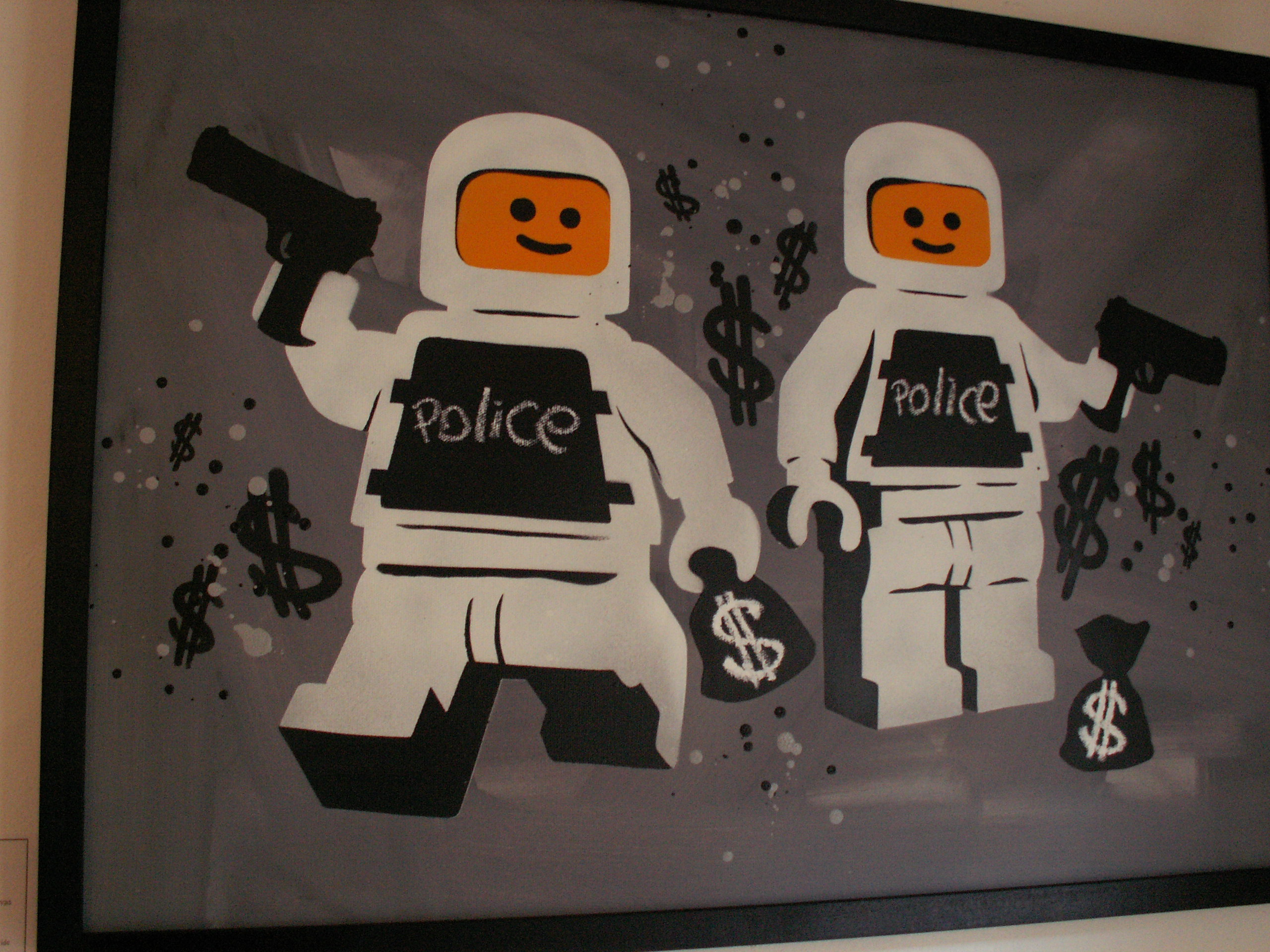

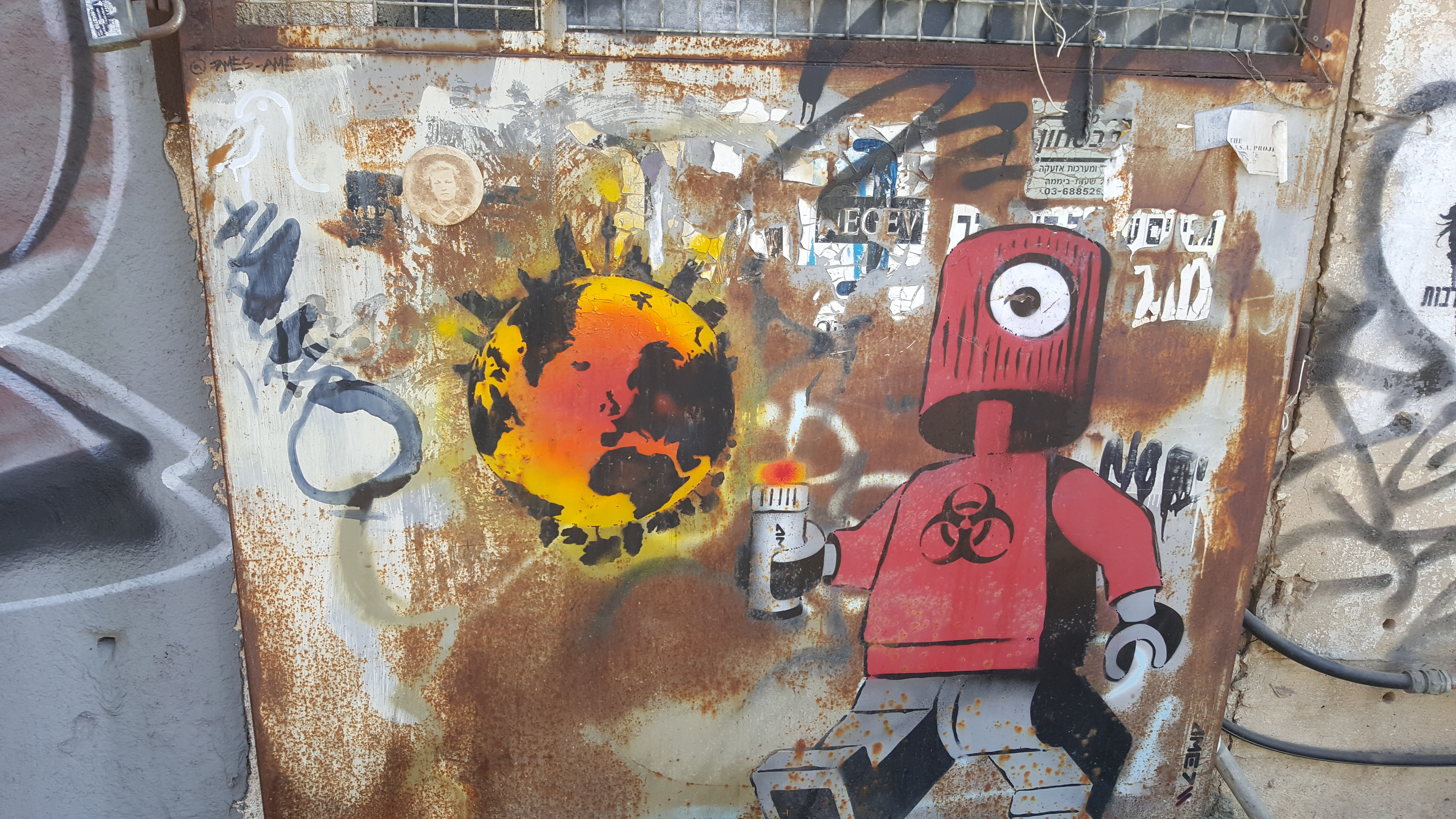
In Florentin nighborhood in Tel Aviv

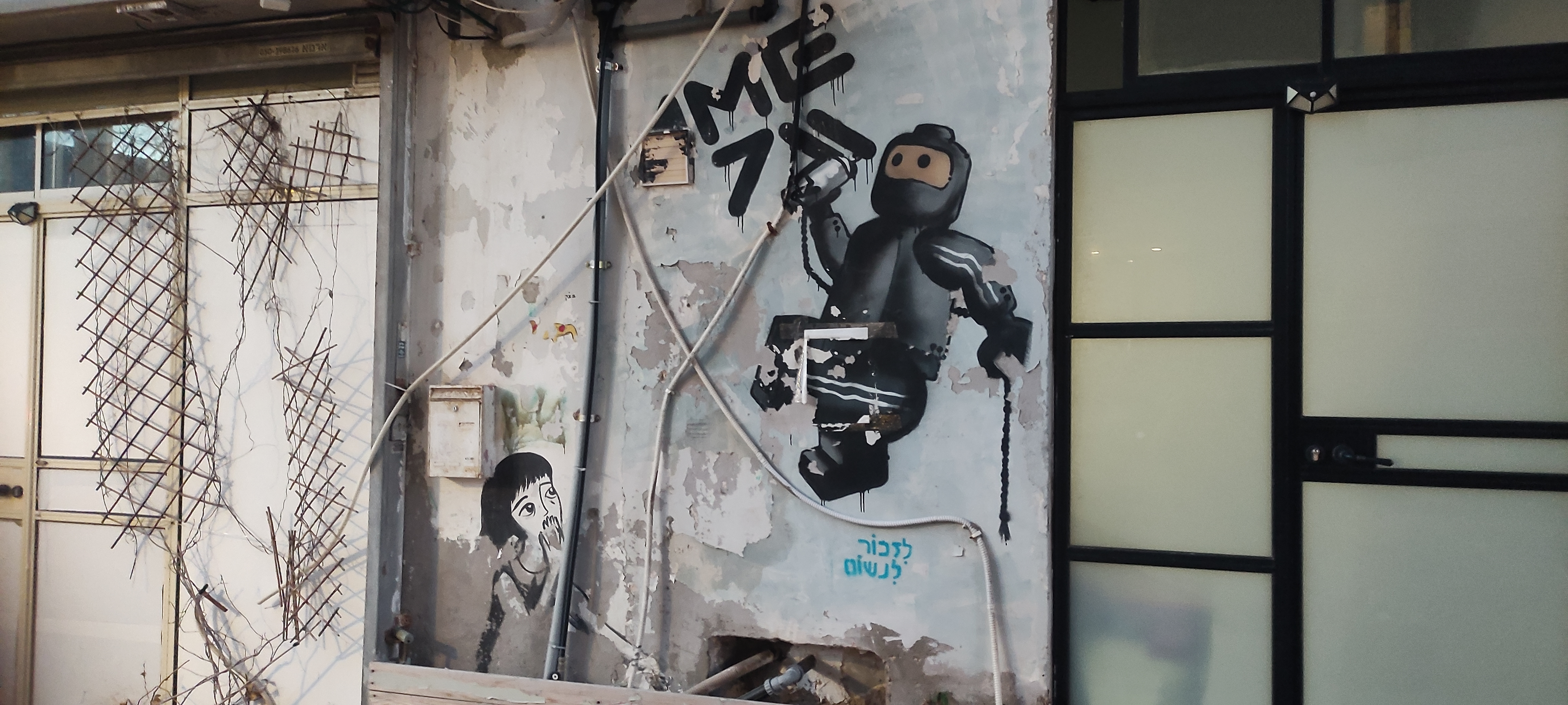
In Florentin nighborhood in Tel Aviv

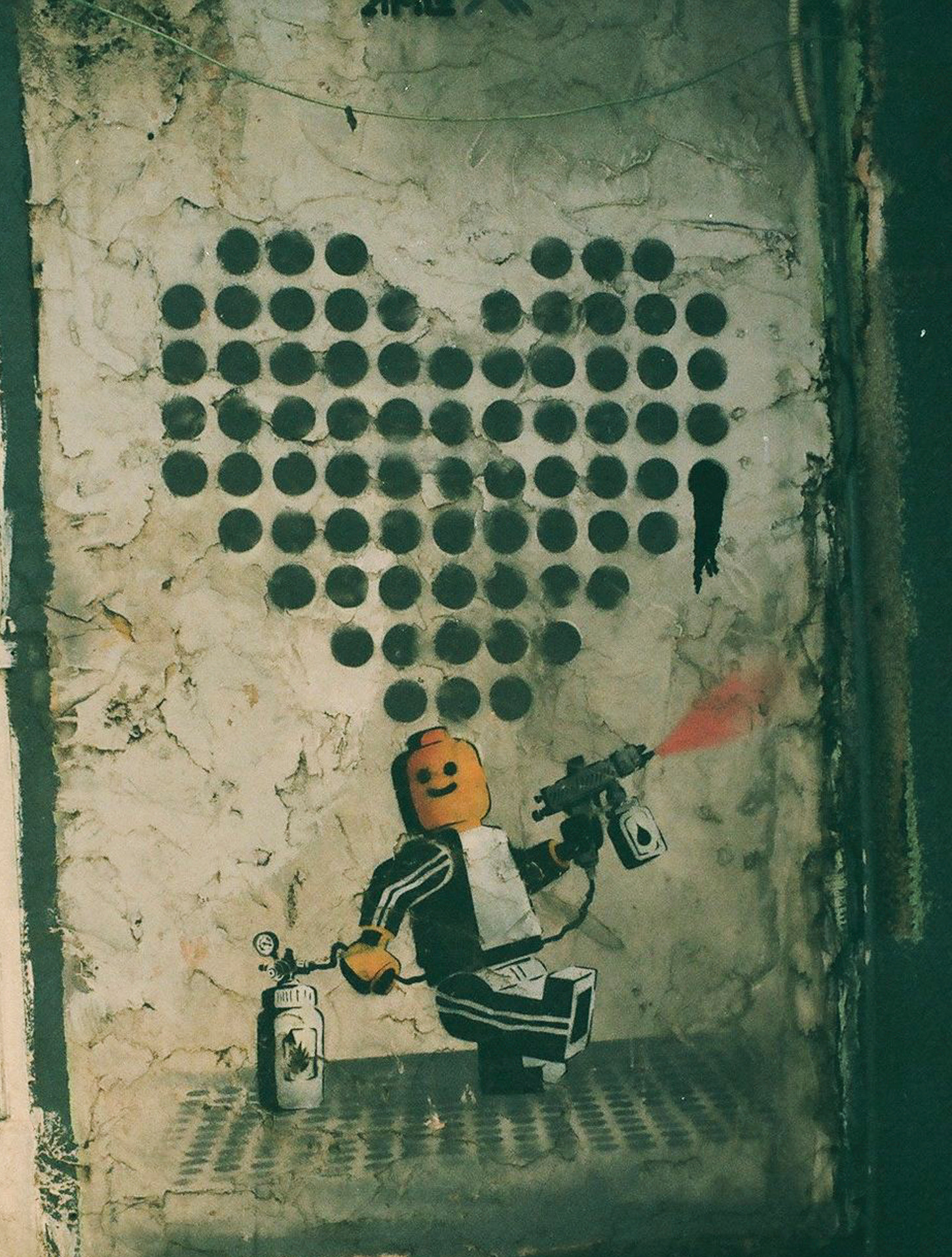

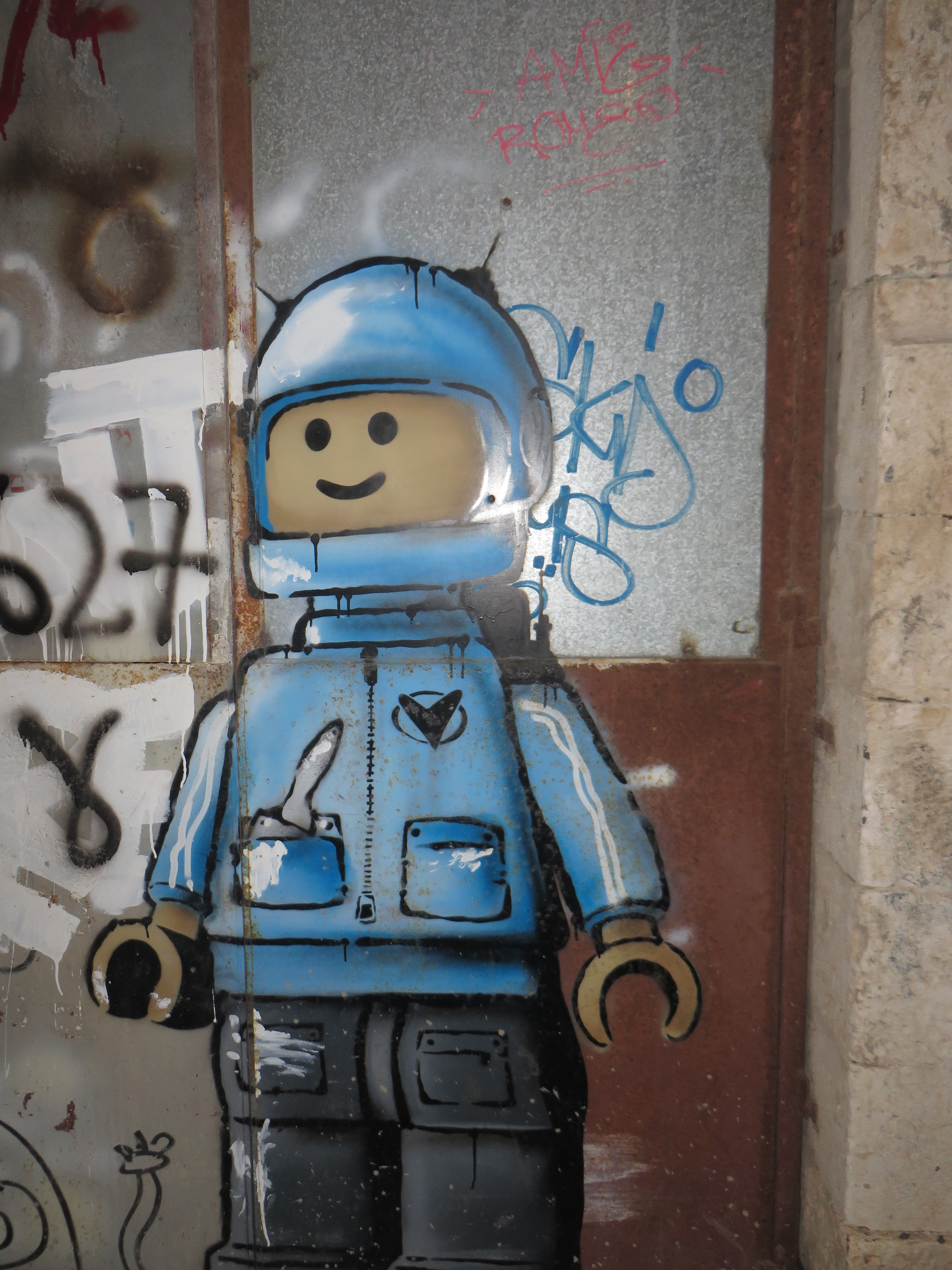
at the Flea market in Jaffa

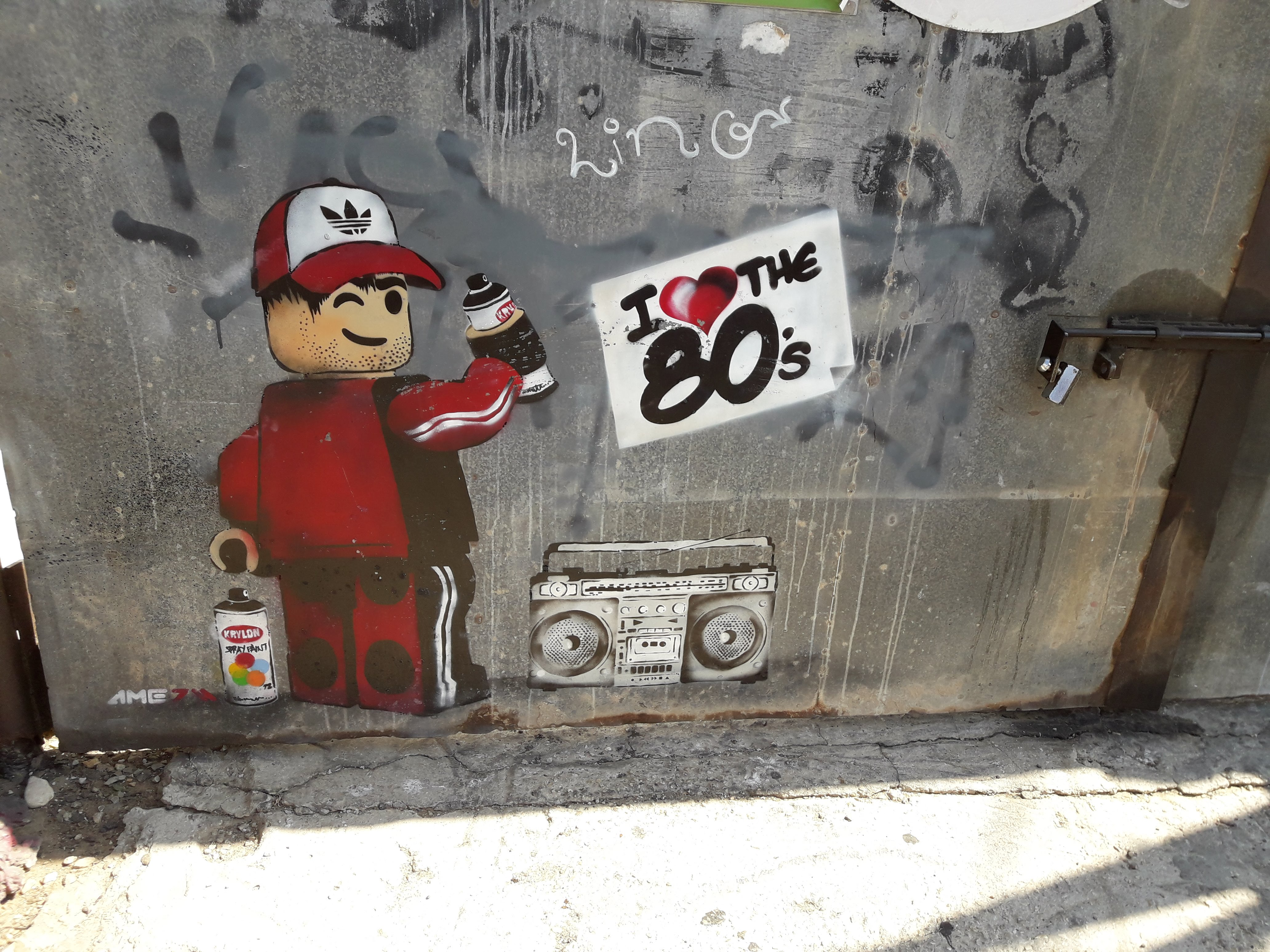

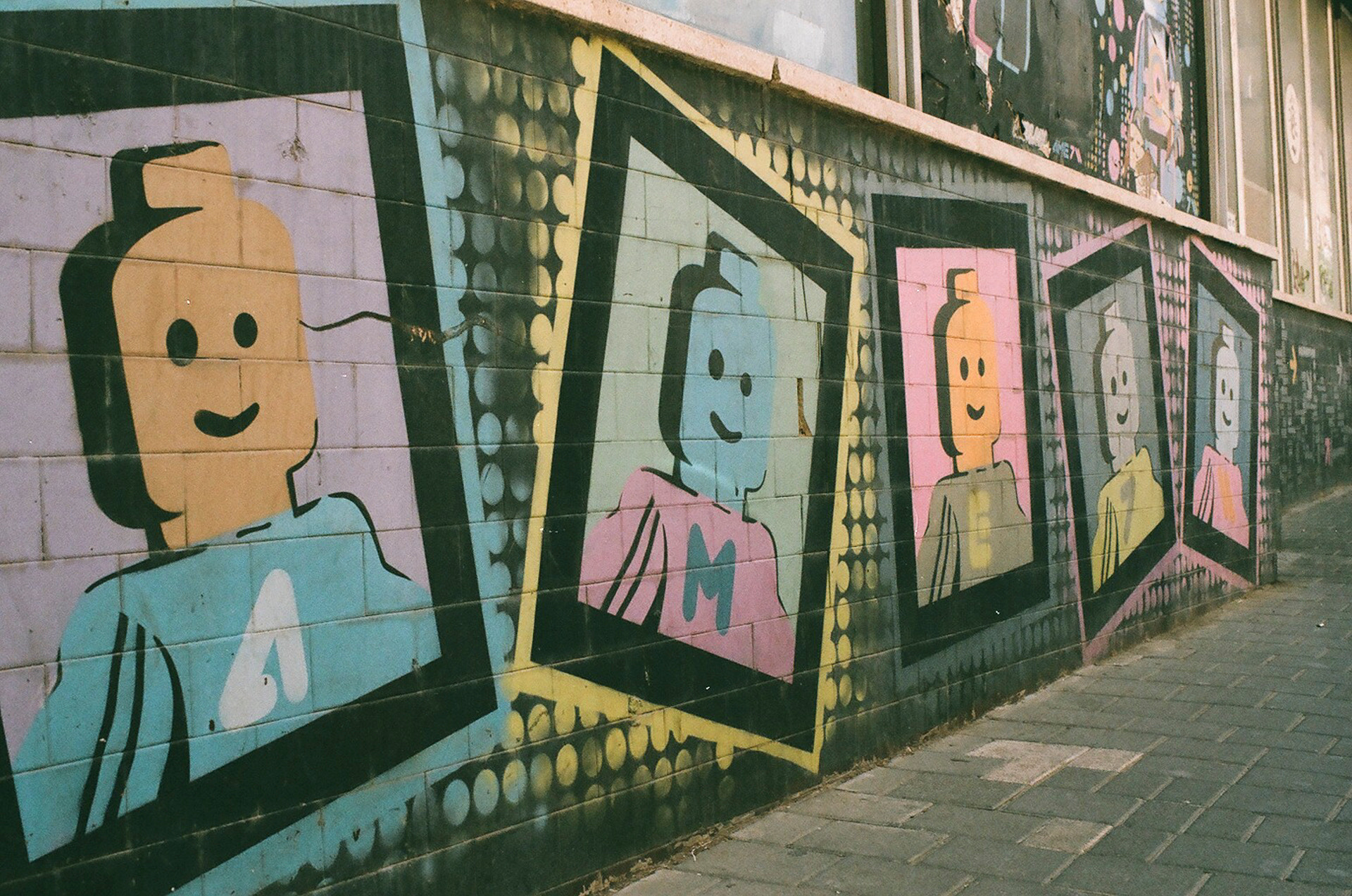

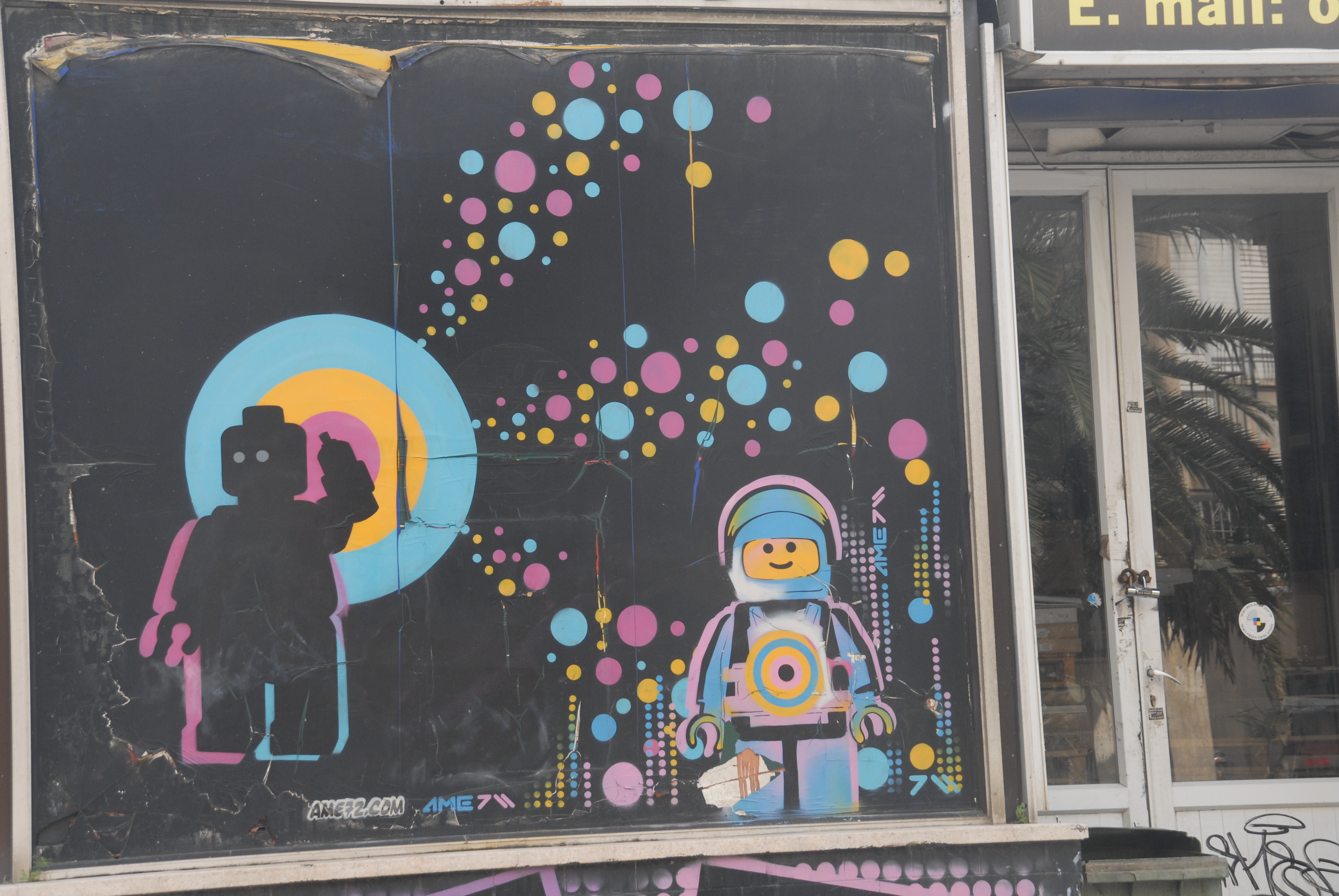
