= Edward von Lõngus =

Estonian artist

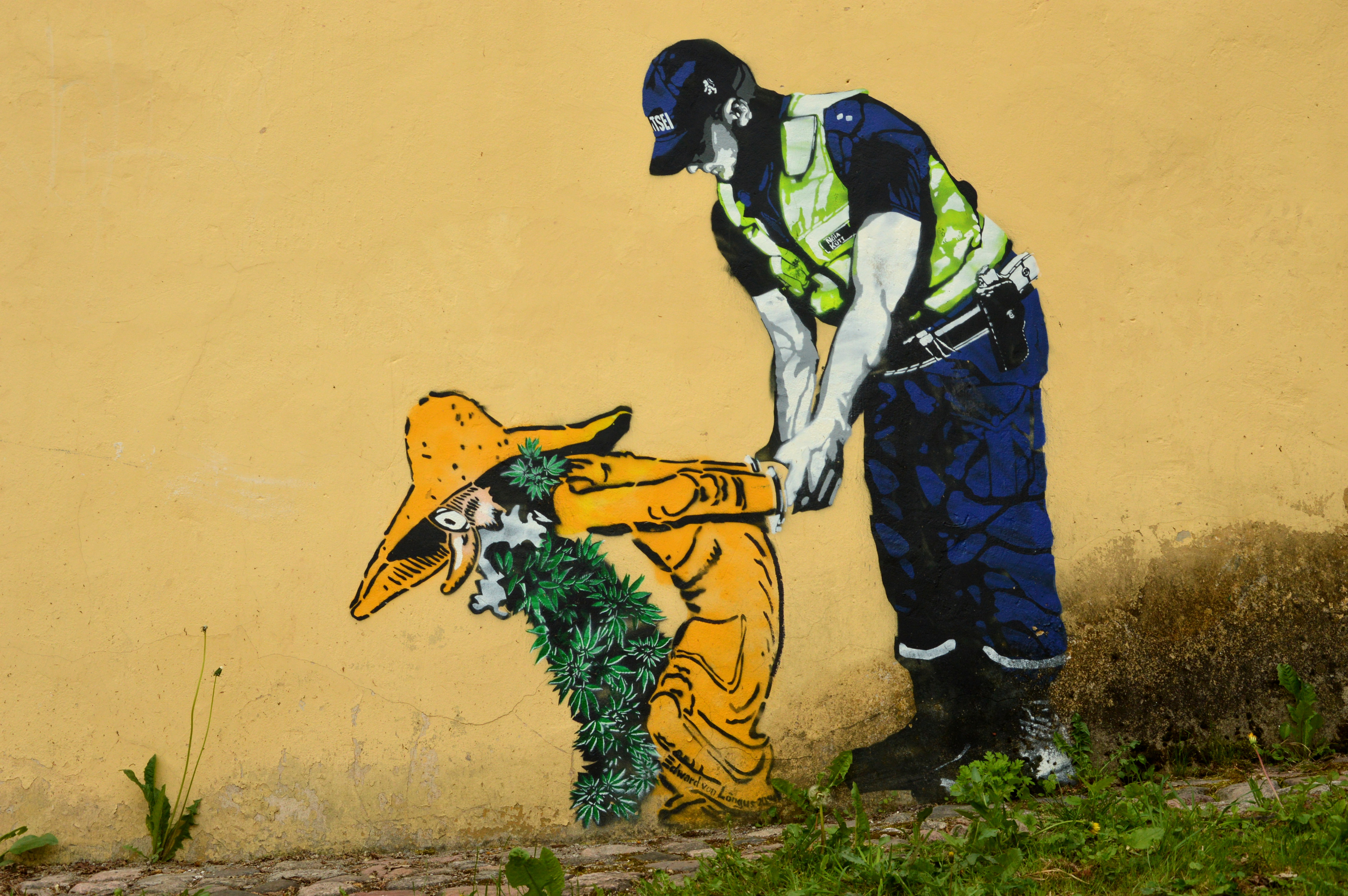
"Cannabeard and the Witch-Hunter" (2014) next to the building of the Supreme Court of Estonia.

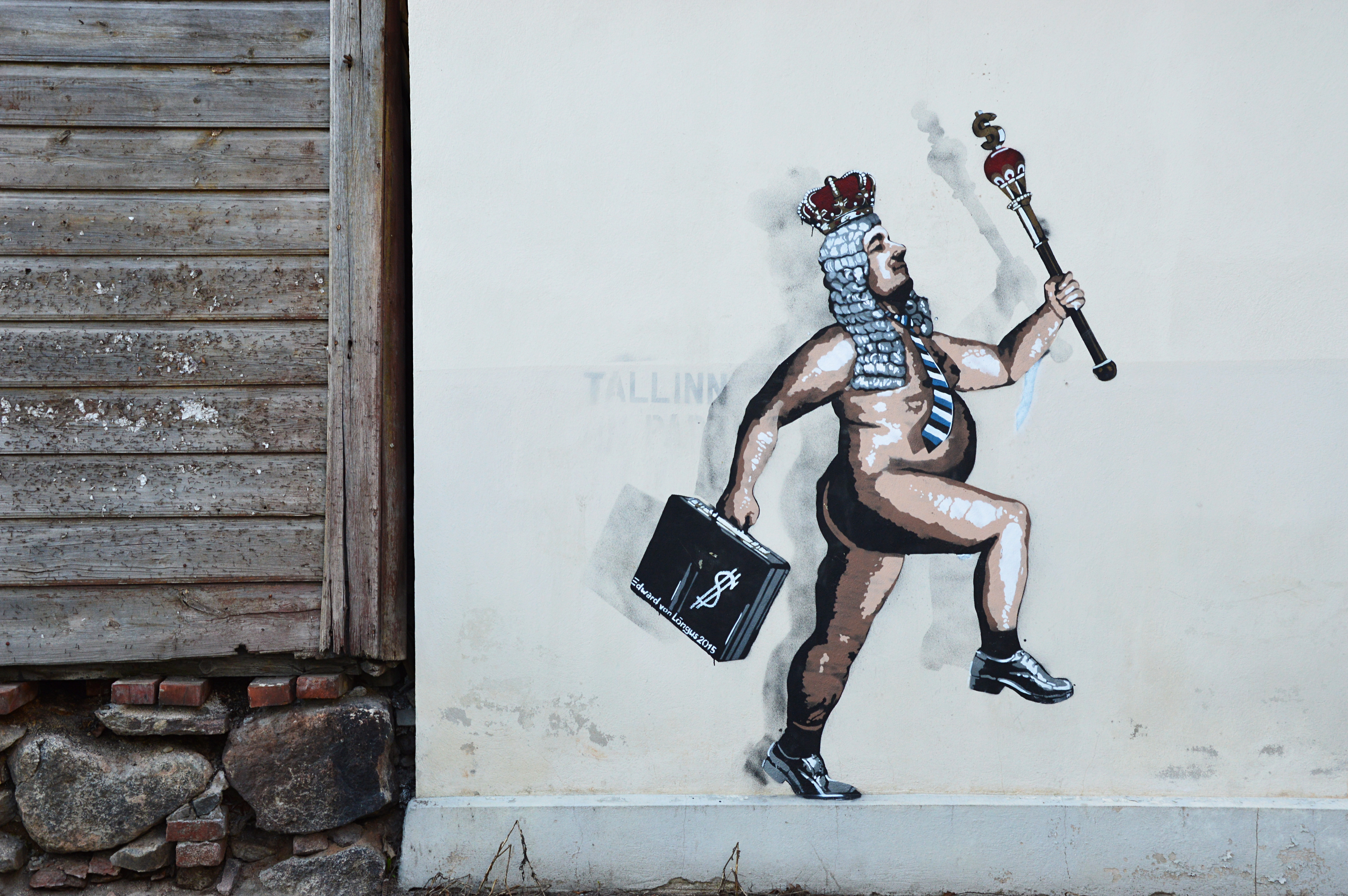
"The Naked Emperor" that went up before the Estonian parliamentary elections in 2015 and caused a lot of stir.

Edward von Lõngus (pseudonym) is an Estonian stencil artist based in Tartu. His works have earned the attention of the media and many art critics, been presented in art exhibitions and sold in art auctions.

He has been compared to Banksy because of the style of his works that often include political and social commentary, his use of stencils and unknown identity.

He received the Tartu City Culture Award in 2014 for his stencil "Cannabeard and the Witch-Hunter" that takes an Estonian children's book character called Sammalhabe ("Mossbeard", from Eno Raud's novel "Naksitrallid") and changes it to produce a piece about the war on drugs.

In January 2019, Edward von Lõngus won the 2018 Culture Award by Estonian Ministry of Foreign Affairs for his digital street art project ‘(R)estart Reality’. In the course of the project, which took place as part of Estonia’s presidency of the European Union and the cultural programme for the celebrations of the 100th anniversary of the Republic of Estonia, he visited 11 European capitals - Brussels, Rome, Berlin, Helsinki, Copenhagen, Paris, London, Vilnius, Rīga, Vienna and Budapest -, painting there street-art connected to Estonian cultural history. To these painting, additional digital audio-video content was connected via an augmented reality app, telling stories about each life-sized painted figure and connecting cultural traditions with Estonia's image as an e-nation.
