= Stencil =

Graphic design technique

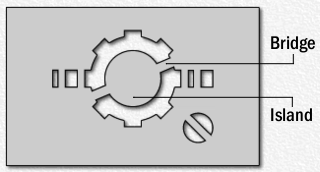
Parts of a stencil

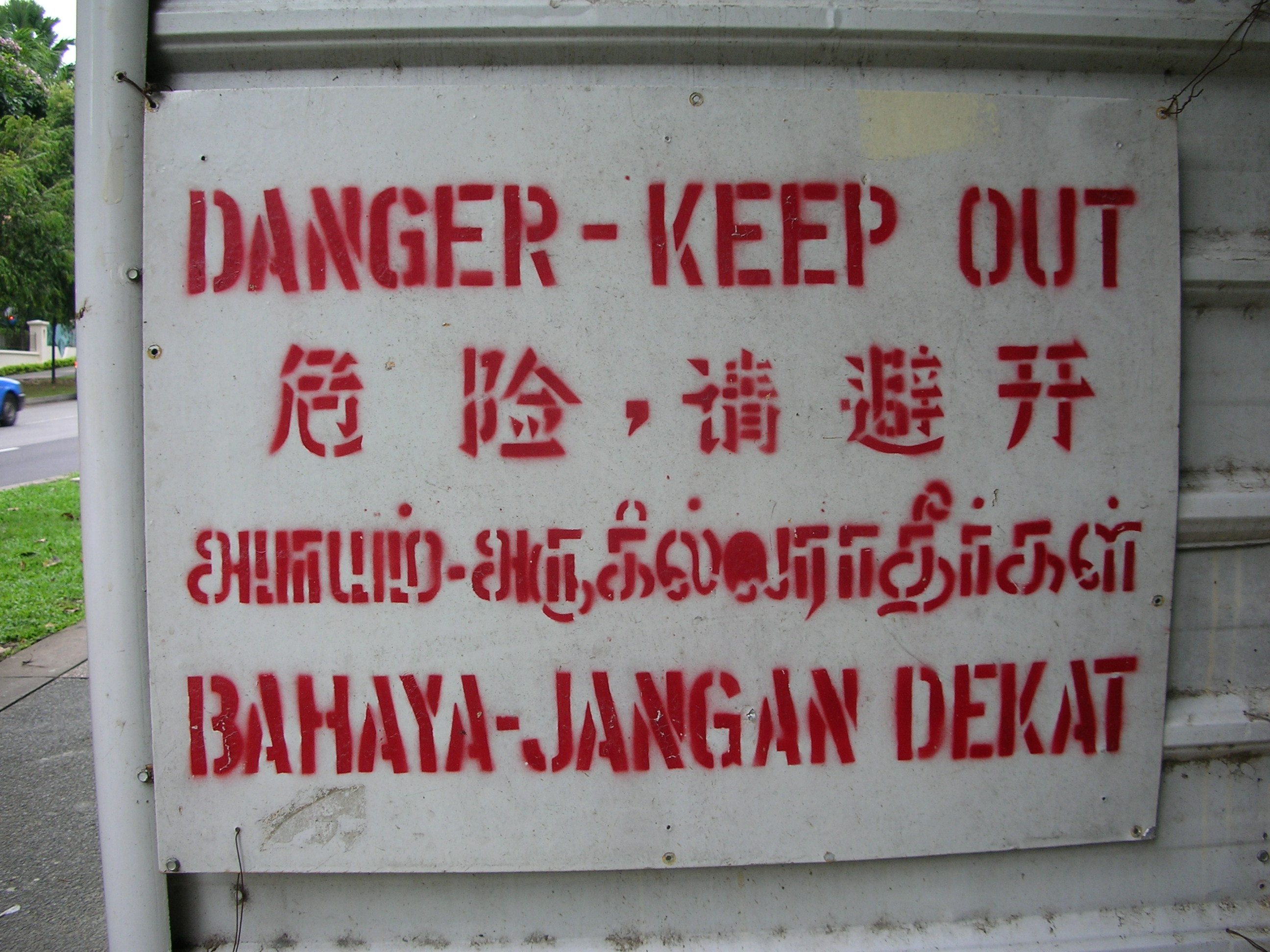
Stenciled warning sign in Singapore

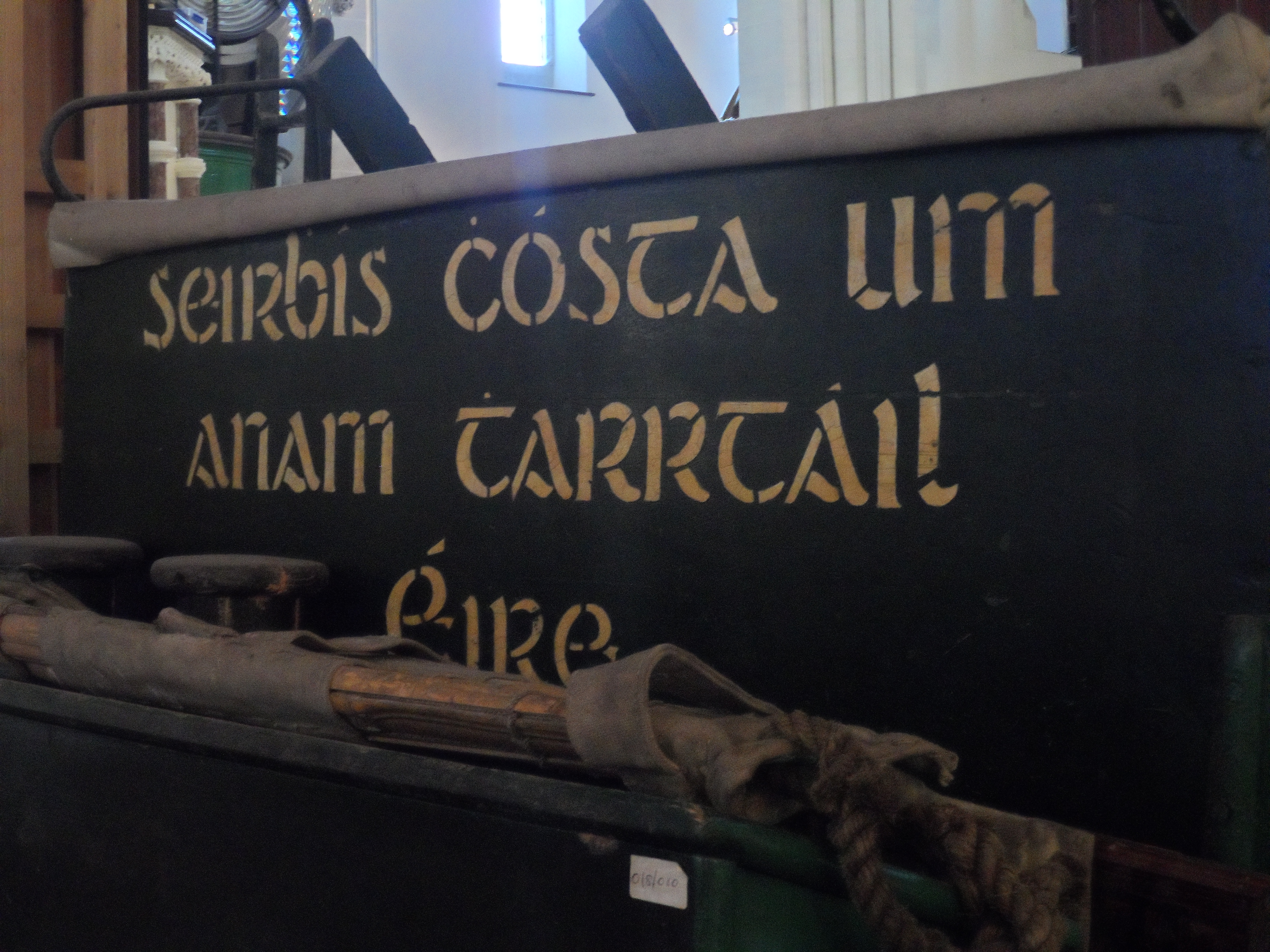
Stencilled Gaelic type

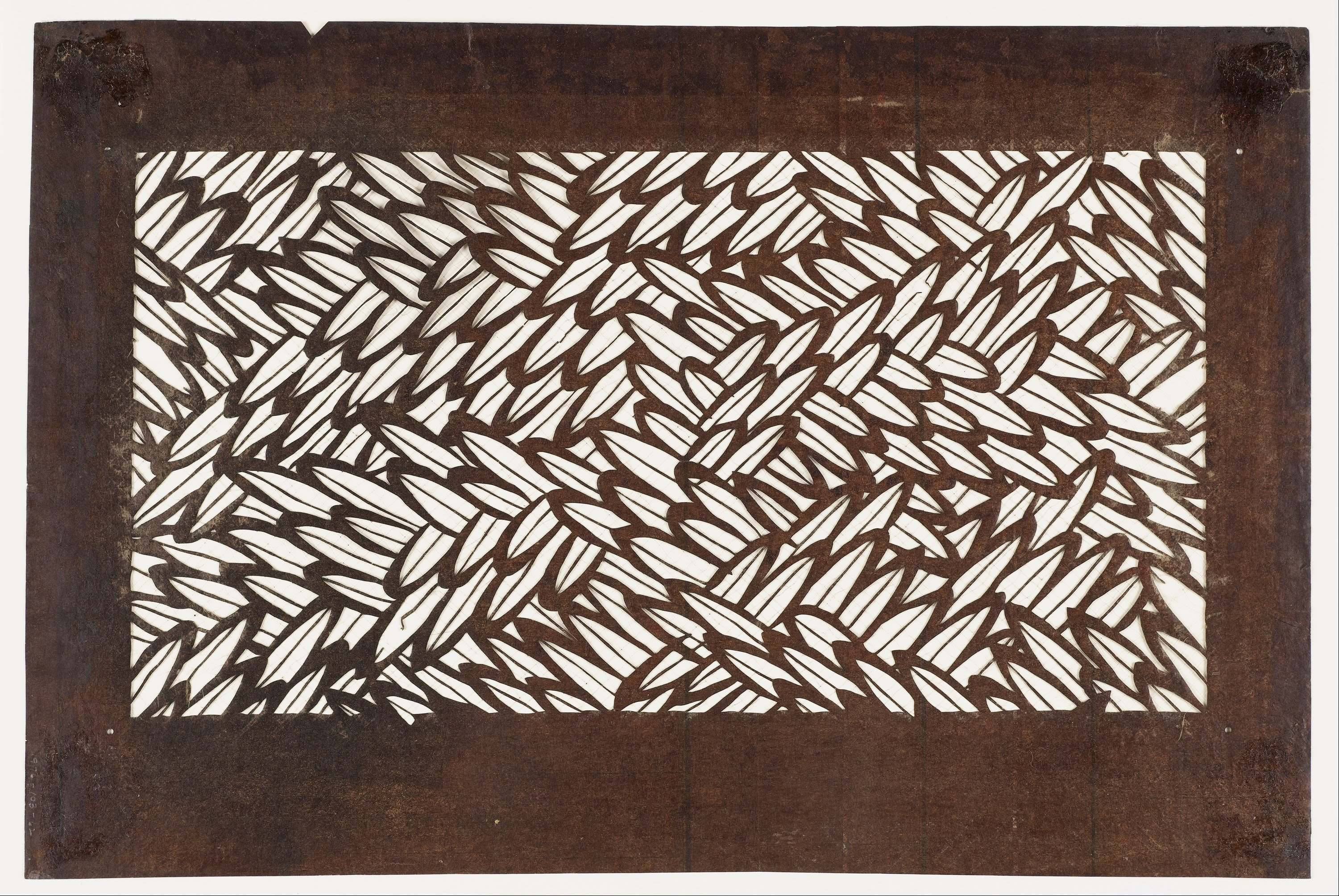
Japanese Ise-katagami stencil for printing textiles

Stencilling produces an image or pattern on a surface by applying pigment to it through an intermediate object, with designed holes in the intermediate object. The holes allow the pigment to reach only some parts of the surface creating the design. The stencil is both the resulting image or pattern and the intermediate object; the context in which stencil is used makes clear which meaning is intended. In practice, the (object) stencil is usually a thin sheet of material, such as paper, plastic, wood or metal, with letters or a design cut from it, used to produce the letters or design on an underlying surface by applying pigment through the cut-out holes in the material.

The key advantage of a stencil is that it can be reused to repeatedly and rapidly produce the same letters or design. Although aerosol or painting stencils can be made for one-time use, typically they are made with the intention of being reused. To be reusable, they must remain intact after a design is produced and the stencil is removed from the work surface. With some designs, this is done by connecting stencil islands (sections of material that are inside cut-out "holes" in the stencil) to other parts of the stencil with bridges (narrow sections of material that are not cut out).

Stencil technique in visual art is also referred to as pochoir. A related technique (which has found applicability in some surrealist compositions) is aerography, in which spray-painting is done around a three-dimensional object to create a negative of the object instead of a positive of a stencil design. This technique was used in cave paintings dating to 10,000 BC, where human hands were used in painting handprint outlines among paintings of animals and other objects. The artist sprayed pigment around his hand by using a hollow bone, blown by mouth to direct a stream of pigment.

Screen printing also uses a stencil process, as does mimeography. The masters from which mimeographed pages are printed are often called "stencils". Stencils can be made with one or many colour layers using different techniques, with most stencils designed to be applied as solid colours. During screen printing and mimeography, the images for stenciling are broken down into color layers. Multiple layers of stencils are used on the same surface to produce multi-colored images.

== History ==
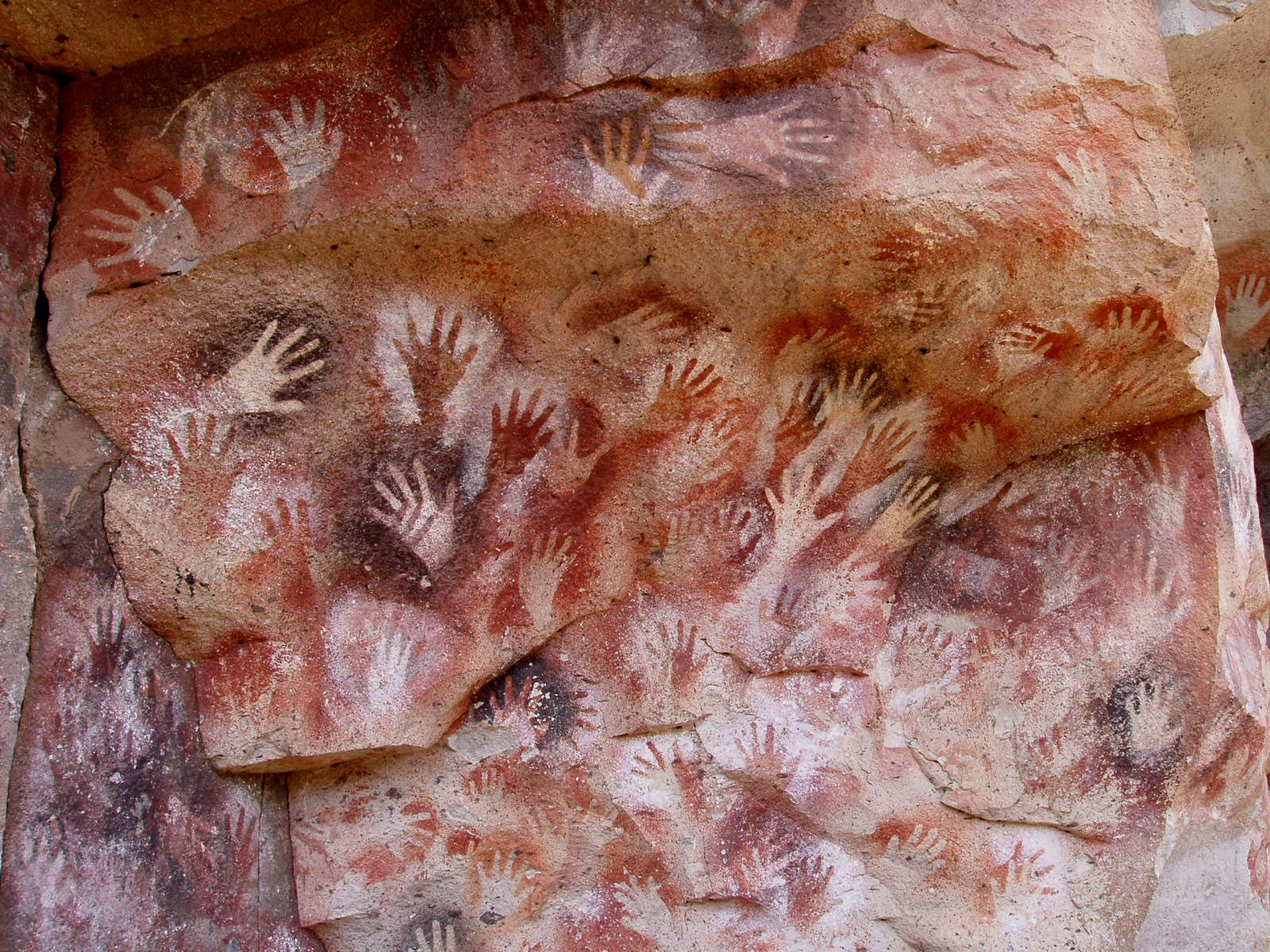
Prehistoric hand stencils, Cueva de las Manos in Argentina

Hand stencils, made by blowing pigment over a hand held against a wall, are found from over 35,000 years ago in Asia and Europe, and later prehistoric dates in other continents. After that stenciling has been used as a historic painting technique on all kinds of materials. Stencils may have been used to color cloth for a very long time; the technique probably reached its peak of sophistication in Katazome and other techniques used on silks for clothes during the Edo period in Japan. In Europe, from about 1450 they were commonly used to color old master prints printed in black and white, usually woodcuts. This was especially the case with playing-cards, which continued to be colored by stencil long after most other subjects for prints were left in black and white. Stencils were used for mass publications, as the type did not have to be hand-written.

== Book illustration ==
Stencils were popular as a method of book illustration, and for that purpose, the technique was at its height of popularity in France during the 1920s when André Marty, Jean Saudé and many other studios in Paris specialized in the technique. Low wages contributed to the popularity of the highly labor-intensive process. When stencils are used in this way they are often called "pochoir". In the pochoir process, a print with the outlines of the design was produced, and a series of stencils were used through which areas of color were applied by hand to the page. To produce detail, a collotype could be produced which the colors were then stenciled over. Pochoir was frequently used to create prints of intense color and is most often associated with Art Nouveau and Art Deco design.

== Aerosol stencils ==
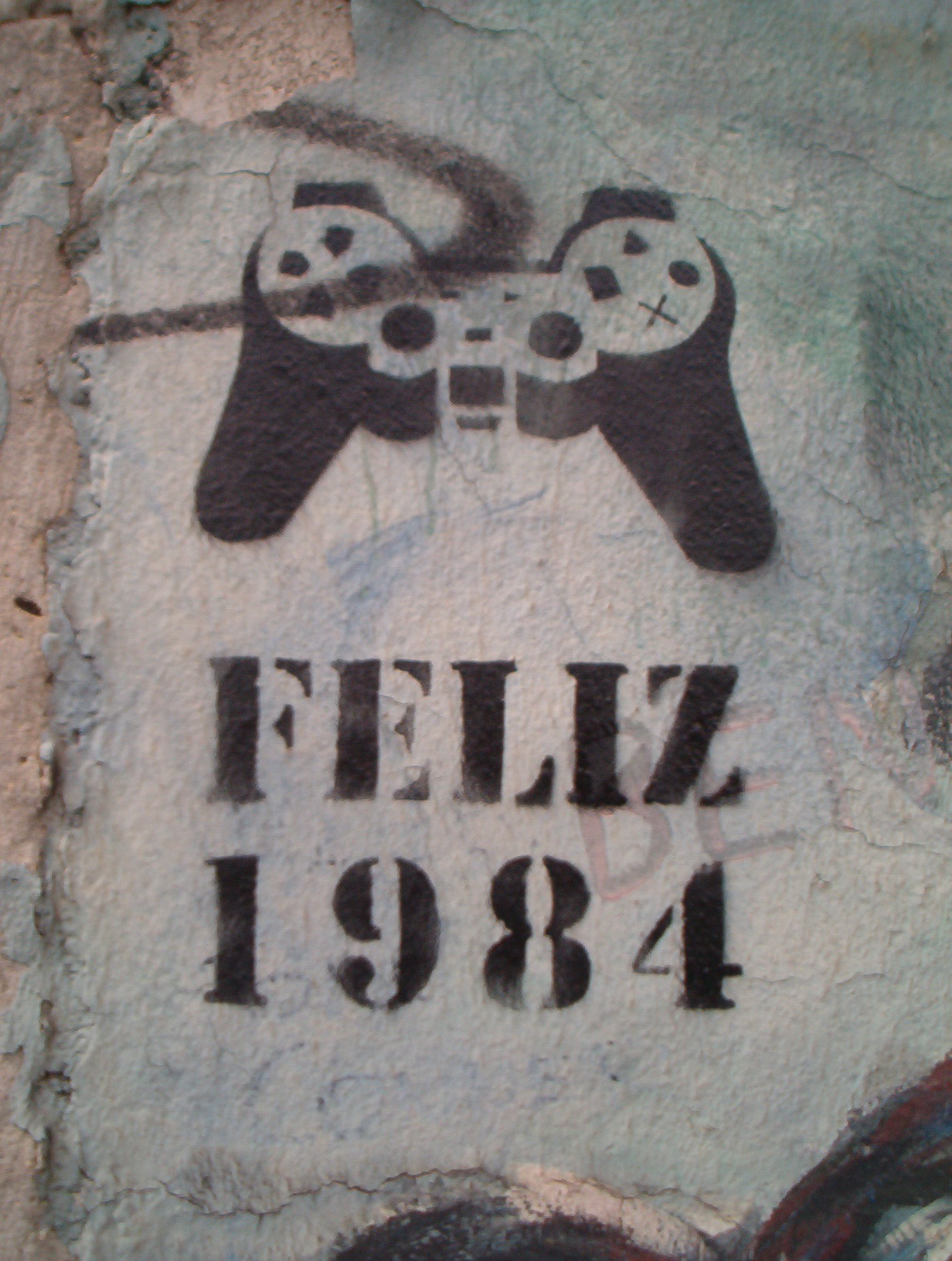
"Happy 1984" — Stencil graffiti found on the Berlin Wall in 2005. The object depicted is a DualShock video game controller.

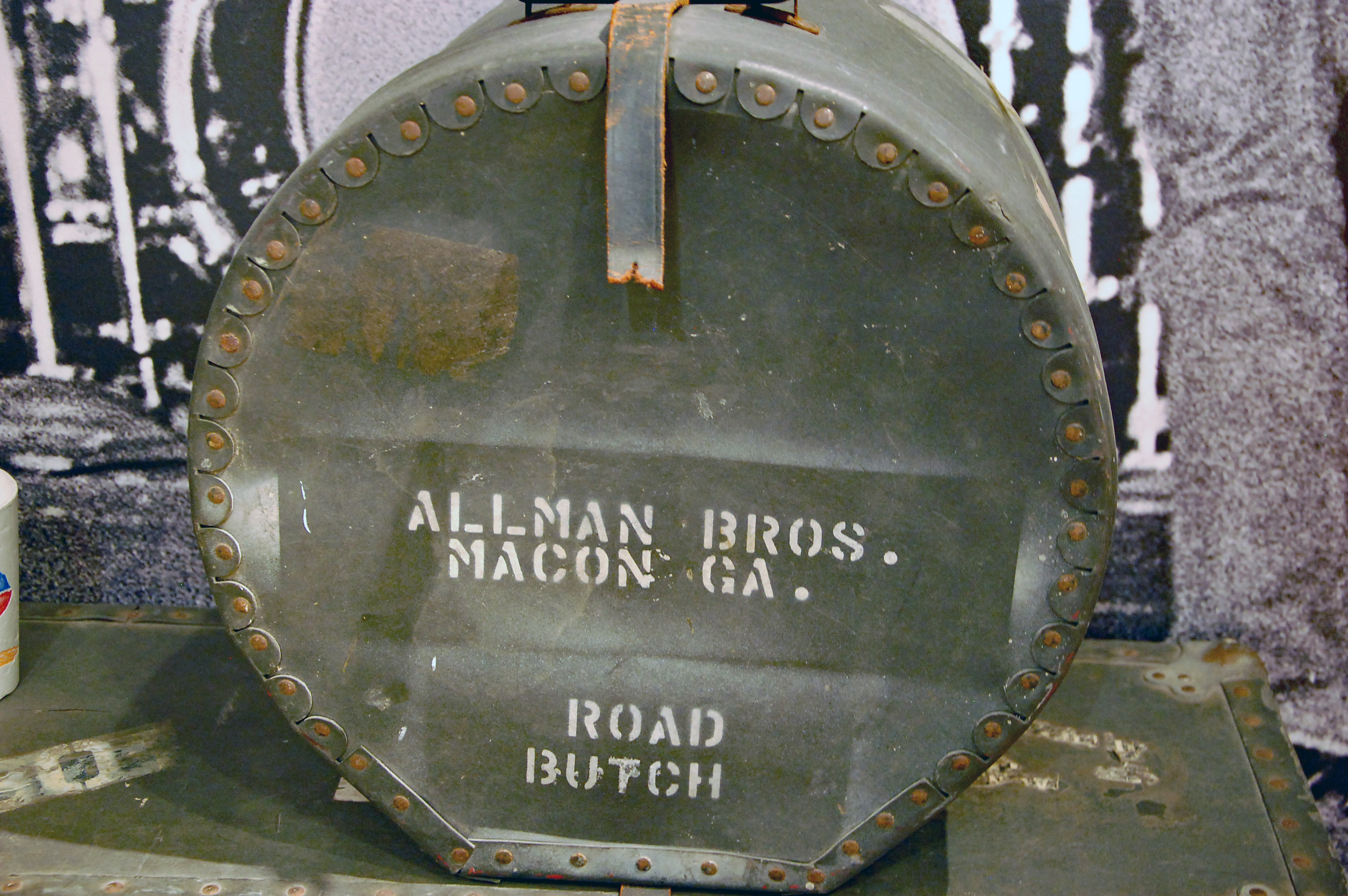
Stencil used for identification (drum case at The Allman Brothers Museum)

Aerosol stencils have many practical applications and the stencil concept is used frequently in industrial, commercial, artistic, residential and recreational settings, as well as by the military, government and infrastructure management. A template is used to create an outline of the image. Stencil templates can be made from any material which will hold its form, ranging from plain paper, cardboard, plastic sheets, metals, and wood.

=== Official use ===
Stencils are frequently used by official organizations, including the military, utility companies, and governments, to quickly and clearly label objects, vehicles, and locations. Stencils for an official application can be customized, or purchased as individual letters, numbers, and symbols. This allows the user to arrange words, phrases and other labels from one set of templates, unique to the item being labeled. When objects are labeled using a single template alphabet, it makes it easier to identify their affiliation or source.

=== Stencil graffiti ===
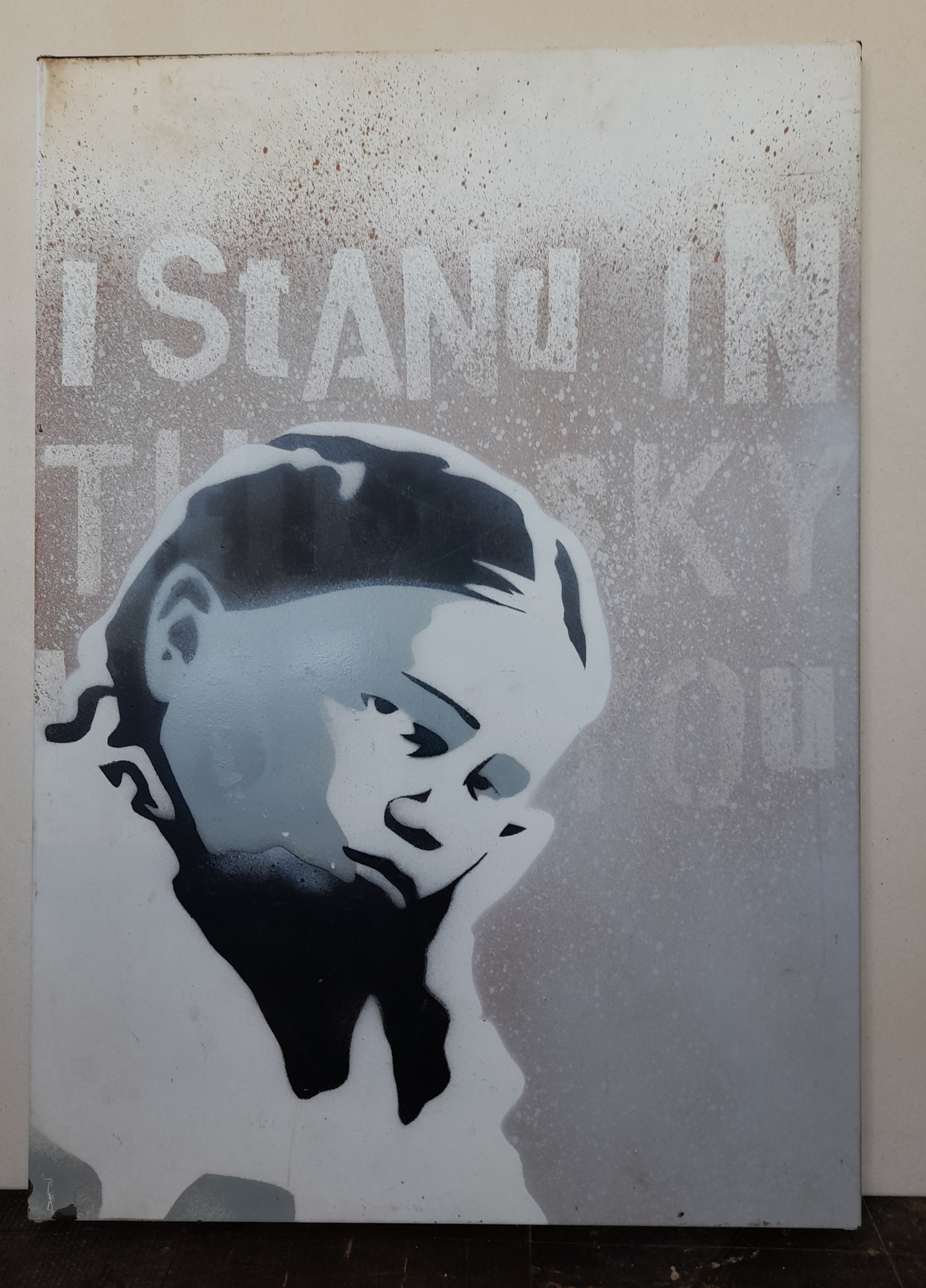
Stencilled picture on an old fridge door, 'I stand in this sky with you'. Artist unknown, made 2005

Stencils have also become popular for street art, less for graffiti, since stencil art using spray-paint can be produced quickly, cheaply and easily repeatable. These qualities are important for graffiti and street artists where graffiti is illegal or quasi-legal, depending on the city and stenciling surface. The extensive lettering possible with stencils makes it especially attractive to political artists. For example, the anarcho-punk band Crass used stencils of anti-war, anarchist, feminist and anti-consumerist messages in a long-term graffiti campaign around the London Underground system and on advertising billboards from 1977 onwards. There has been a semi-recent trend in making multi-layered stencils with different shades of grey for each layer creating a more detailed stenciled image. Also well known for their use of stencil graffiti are Alex Vallauri, John Fekner, Blek le Rat, Epsylon Point, Marie Rouffet, Nuklé-art, Kim Prisu, Miss Tic and Jef Aérosol from France, British artist Banksy, Tavar Zawacki f.k.a. 'ABOVE', Shepard Fairey's OBEY, and Pirate & Acid from Hollywood, California.

== Home stenciling ==
A common tradition for stencils is in home decorating and arts & crafts. Home decor stencils are an important part of the DIY (Do It Yourself) industry. There are prefabricated stencil templates available for home decoration projects from hardware stores, arts & crafts stores and through the internet. Stencils are usually applied in the home with a paint or roller brush along wall borders and as trim. They can also be applied with a painted sponge for a textured effect.

Stencil templates can be purchased or constructed individually. Typically they are constructed of flexible plastics, including acetate, mylar, and vinyl. Stencils can be used as children's toys.

== Military stenciling ==
Stencils have been used in the military across most nations for many years and continue to be used today. They are used to mark up equipment, vehicles, rations, signposts, helmets, etc. One use of military stencils was the application of playing card designs to USA Airborne helmets during World War Two as a method to identify regimental units.

== Silk screening ==
Silk screening is a type of printing on paper or textiles, in which an ink is embedded in the cloth. The ink is controlled through the use of a stencil, which is placed directly over the paper or textile. This process can only handle one color of ink at a time. Therefore, multi-colored designs must be silk screened several times, with each interval taking time to dry.

== Micro- and nanostencil ==
Stencils are also used in micro- and nanotechnology, as miniature shadow masks through which material can be deposited, etched or ions implanted onto a substrate. These stencils are usually made out of thin (100-500 nm) low-stress Silicon nitride (SiN) in which apertures are defined by various lithographic techniques (e. g. electron beam, photolithography).

Stencil lithography has unique advantages compared to other patterning techniques: it does not require spinning of a uniform layer of resist (therefore patterns can be created on 3D topographies) and it does not involve any heat or chemical treatment of the substrate (like baking, developing and removing the resist). Thus it allows a wide range of substrates (e.g. flexible, surface-treated) and materials (e. g. organics) to be used.

The three-dimensional shape of a structure deposited using a micro- or nano-stencil can be predicted by modelling. This has been experimentally verified.

== Other stencil forms ==
=== Screen printing ===
A stencil technique is employed in screen printing which uses a tightly woven mesh screen coated in a thin layer of emulsion to reproduce the original image. As the stencil is attached to the screen, a contiguous template is not necessary.

=== Airbrushing ===
A stencil used in airbrushing called a frisket is pressed directly on the artwork. It can be used to control or contain overspray, create sharp or complex shapes, but is not designed to be used more than once.

=== Wall stencils ===
Wall stencils are used to decorate walls and ceilings.

=== Rock art ===
One form of pictograph found in ancient and traditional rock paintings is created by the hand first being placed against the panel, with dry paint then being blown onto it through a tube, in a process that is akin to air-brush or spray-painting. The resulting image is a negative print of the hand, and is sometimes described as a "stencil" in Australian archaeology.

Miniature rock art of the stencilled variety at a rock shelter known as Yilbilinji, in the Limmen National Park in the Northern Territory, is one of only three known examples of such art. Usually stencilled art is life-size, using body parts as the stencil, but the 17 images of designs of human figures, boomerangs, animals such as crabs and long-necked turtles, wavy lines and geometric shapes are very rare. Found in 2017 by archaeologists, the only other recorded examples are at Nielson's Creek in New South Wales and at Kisar Island in Indonesia. It is thought that the designs may have been created by stencils fashioned out of beeswax.

== See also ==
- List of stencil artists
- Mimeograph
- Quarter marks
- ROSTA Windows
- Spirit duplicator
- Stencil graffiti
- Stencil (numerical analysis)
- Stencil printing
- Stencil (typeface)
- Street art
- Theorem Stencil
