= DNZ (artist) =

Anonymous street artist

D.N.Z
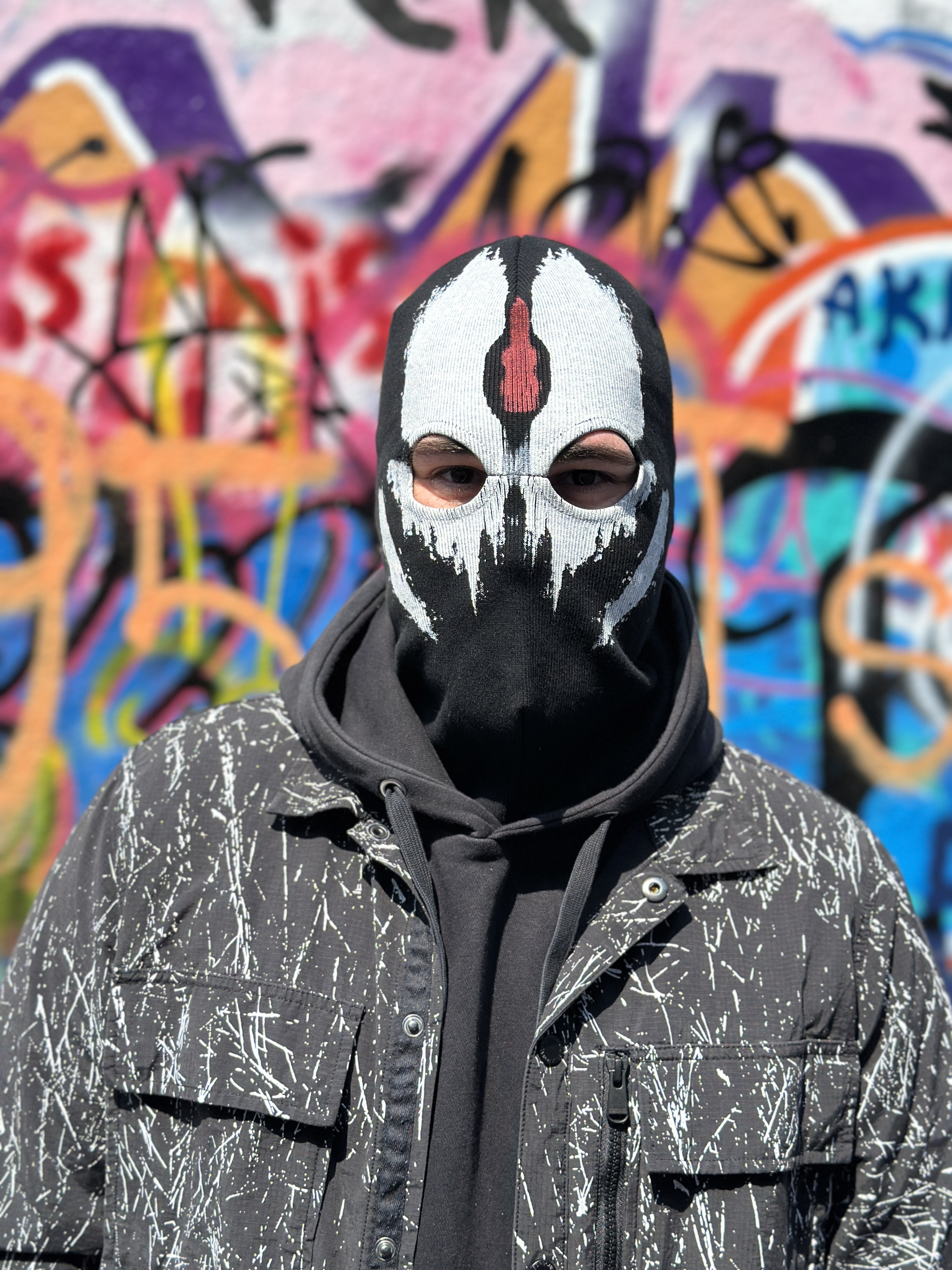
- Known for: Street art, murals
- Notable work: RNLI mural (Rhyl); "Strung along lover" (Hackney); mural series in Wales; works in Denver/Florida/Los Angeles
- Movement: Street art
- Awards: Shortlisted, Dubel Prize Emerging British Artist of the Year (2025)

DNZ (also stylised D.N.Z) is an anonymous street artist whose works have appeared in London, Wales, Denver, Florida and Los Angeles. His stencilled murals, sometimes compared to Banksy, mix political, symbolic, and figurative themes, while maintaining the artist's anonymity.

== Street work ==
DNZ's street art has appeared in several parts of the United Kingdom and abroad.

In Hackney, London, he created a piece titled Strung along lover on 25 February beside a red phone box on Southgate Road. A video on his Instagram shows the artist stencilling a silhouette of a woman connected by phone-line to the box. He has also painted near Belsize Park tube station, including imagery of a child in a gas mask under the words "World War Free".

In Wales, DNZ was identified as the creator of a mural in Rhyl paying tribute to the RNLI, described locally as "Banksy-style" and later protected with perspex. In January 2025, he produced a series of five murals across Denbighshire and Flintshire:

- a cow in Mold (on the Tafarn Derwen pub),
- an owl in a Trefnant bus shelter,
- a knight on horseback in Ruthin (interpreted as Owain Glyndŵr),
- a pheasant in St Asaph,
- and a boy with an umbrella on Rhyl promenade.

Another early mural in Rhos on Sea – depicting an angler hooking a fish-shaped bikini bra – vanished within 12 hours of being completed. Painted on metal sheeting covering a property, the sheets were removed and taken. The thieves assuming that due to its style, it was a Banksy.

In Denbigh, additional works including pigeons, rabbits, and ants appeared in 2024, again sparking speculation about Banksy before DNZ claimed them.

Outside the UK, DNZ's works have appeared on the streets of Denver and Florida in the United States, and he has also painted pieces in Los Angeles.

== Style and themes ==
DNZ utilises multi-layer stencil techniques and bold graphic visuals. His murals often explore themes such as social justice, symbolism, and urban life, frequently referencing local settings or historical events. Media coverage has repeatedly compared his work to Banksy due to anonymity and stencil methods, although DNZ emphasises his own distinct style.

== Reception ==
His murals were initially attributed to Banksy before DNZ claimed them. The Hackney and Wales works in particular drew responses locally.

== Awards and recognition ==
In 2025, DNZ was shortlisted as an Emerging British Artist of the Year finalist for the Dubel Prize, a competition highlighting emerging contemporary artists.

== See also ==
- Stencil graffiti – Graffiti painted through a stencil
