= Ray Ferrer =

American artist

- Born: Reinaldo Antonio Ferrer III; August 3, 1979; New York, New York, United States
- Died: May 20, 2015; San Diego, California
- Known for: Spray paint art
- Website: ArtistRay.com

Ray Ferrer (August 3, 1979 – May 20, 2015) was a world-renowned, American artist known for his work with spray paint and hand-cut stencils.

Ferrer's medium was a variation of Spray paint art. He typically painted a canvas dark and then painted onto it through a stencil with a lighter colour. He used an X-Acto knife to cut his stencils. Ferrer's subjects included musicians, actors, architecture and pop culture, including Bob Dylan, Nina Simone, Willie Nelson, Jim Hendrix, James Gandolfini, The Wizard of Oz and Star Wars. He showcased his work on his 'Urban Wall Art' blog and social media. The Jimi Hendrix work is owned by writer Hunter S. Jones according to her Twitter feed.

Before becoming an artist Ferrer spent seven years in the US Army. Following this he studied Engineering and received an MBA from Auburn University, later working as a corporate consultant.

Ray Ferrer was a resident of San Diego, California until his death after relocating from the East Coast in 2014.

Ray was diagnosed with a large brain tumor in January 2015 after his wife found him having a seizure and died five months later.
