= Destination New Zealand =

New Zealand television programme

Destination New Zealand is a tourism television programme that features major tourism locations in New Zealand. The programme is produced by Tourism Network, who work with Tourism New Zealand to promote tourists to travel and explore New Zealand.

== About the programme ==
There are 14 episodes of Destination New Zealand, which takes viewers to:

- Northland
- Auckland
- Coromandel
- Rotorua
- Gisborne
- Hawkes Bay
- Wellington
- Nelson
- Marlborough
- Canterbury
- West Coast
- Queenstown

Destination New Zealand is hosted by New Zealand actress Miriama Smith and shows regional attractions including vineyards, accommodation, food, excursions and adventures.

== International Broadcasters ==
Country	TV Network(s)	Series Premiere	Status
Australia	Channel Seven	2007	All episodes aired
United Kingdom	Life One	2007	Currently airing
Hong Kong	TVB Pearl	2009	Currently airing
