= Spray paint =

Paint stored in and administered by the use of pressurized containers

- Aerosol paint can: propellant at the top of the can presses down on the mixture of paint and propellant in the bottom, forcing the mixture up through the dip tube when the valve is opened

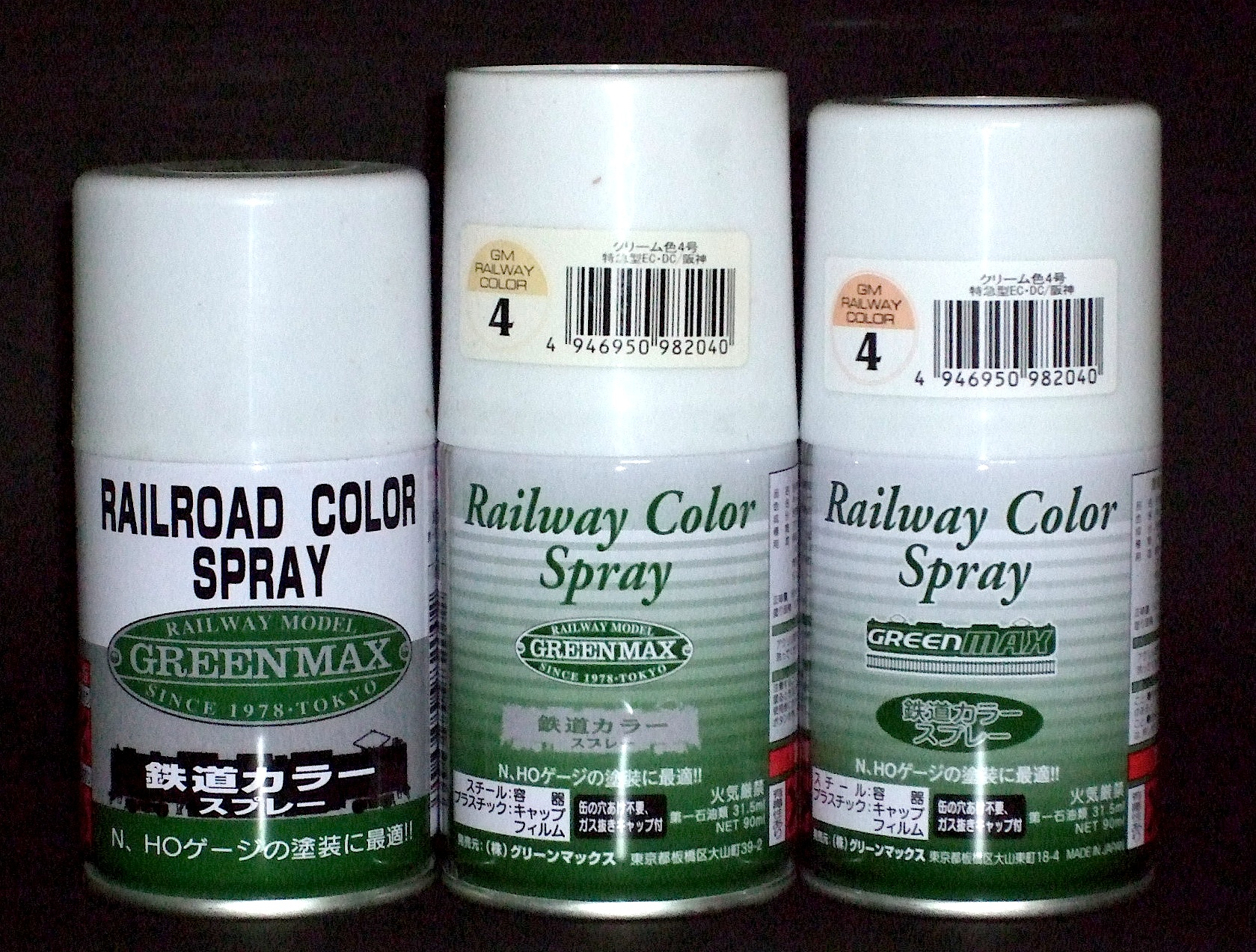
- Spray paint tins Tins of railway modelling brand GreenMax’s spray paint
- Classification: Paint
- Uses: Graffiti
- Inventor: Erik Rotheim

Spray paint (formally aerosol paint) is paint that comes in a sealed, pressurized can and is released in an aerosol spray when a valve button is depressed. The propellant is what the container of pressurized gas is called. When the pressure holding the gas is released through the valve, the aerosol paint releases as a fine spray. Aerosol painting is one form of spray painting; it leaves a smooth, even coat, unlike many traditional rolled and brushed paints. Aerosol primer can be applied directly to bare metal and many plastics.

Most aerosol paints also have a metal, marble, glass or plastic ball called a pea inside of the can, which is used to mix the paint when the can is shaken.

Aerosol propellants consist of flammable gas combinations that can lead to fire and explosions if they are sprayed, punctured, or exposed to flames.

Aerosol paint needs different types of plastic-like polymers to make it work. The most commonly used are alkyds and acrylics. Polyvinyl acetate (PVA) is another substitute for acrylics. Different companies will use specific mixes of polymers and plasticizers (like dibutyl phthalate and dibutyl meleate) to make the spray paint flexible and durable.

== History ==
In 1926, Norwegian engineer Erik Rotheim applied for the first patent for an aerosol can that could hold products and dispense them with the use of propellants. By 1931, Rotheim was recognized for his invention and considered a pioneer in this field.

In the 1940s, the paint industry took another step forward with the invention of the aerosol can. Originally developed by the military as a tool to dispense insecticide, aerosol systems were quickly adapted to other product categories including spray paint. In 1948, the Chase Company in Chicago became one of three businesses licensed by the United States Department of Agriculture to make aerosol mosquito repellents. Using similar technology and equipment, a few years later they became the first commercial producers of spray paint. In 1949, Edward H. Seymour, of Sycamore, Illinois, added paint to existing spray can technology at his wife Bonnie's suggestion. It was initially designed to demonstrate an aluminum paint he developed. His patent was awarded in 1951. Spray paint has been used in modern graffiti since its origins, originating with TAKI 183's marker tagging, and expanding into spray paint.

== Uses ==
A typical paint valve system has a "female" valve; the stem is part of the top actuator. The valve can be preassembled with the valve cup and installed on the can as one piece, before pressure-filling. The actuator is added afterward.

Acrylic-based craft primers and vinyl dye can be used on plastics like models or miniatures.

Most brands include a wide variety of paints, including primers, heat, and traffic resistant enamels, gloss and matte finishes, metallic colors, and textured paints for home decor.

Aerosol paint is useful for quick, semi-permanent marking on construction and surveying sites. Inverted cans for street, utility or field marking can be used upside-down with an extension pole. APWA (American Public Works Association) has standardized colors for utility and excavation markings. Hiking trails can also be marked with aerosol paint trail blazes.

Small to medium-sized repairs to automobile bodywork can be completed by enthusiasts at home using aerosol paint, though to paint an entire vehicle in this manner would be difficult and expensive. The main disadvantages, compared to a professional spray gun, include the limited quality provided by the built-in nozzle and the lack of infrared baking after applying the paint, which indicates that the paint could take several months to obtain its final hardness.

== In art ==
=== Graffiti and street art uses ===
Spray paint is a popular medium among graffiti artists due to its portability, permanence, and speed. The product's presence in the United States goes back to 1949, when it was designed with the purpose of painting radiators with aluminum paint.

Speed, portability, and permanence make aerosol paint a common graffiti medium. In the late 1970s, street graffiti writers' signatures and murals became more elaborate and a unique style developed as a factor of the aerosol medium and the speed required for illicit work. Many now recognize graffiti and street art as a unique art form and specifically manufactured aerosol paints are made for the graffiti artist.

Graffiti artist paints tend to be more expensive, but have a wider selection of rich colors, are thicker and less likely to drip. They are produced in standard high-pressure cans for fast, thick coverage and lower pressure cans for more control and flexibility. Most art brand paints have two or three mixing peas in a can. A wide array of actuators or caps are available, from standard "skinny" caps to wider "fat" caps, as well as caps that control the softness or crispness of the spray. Calligraphy caps create fan spray instead of the standard round.

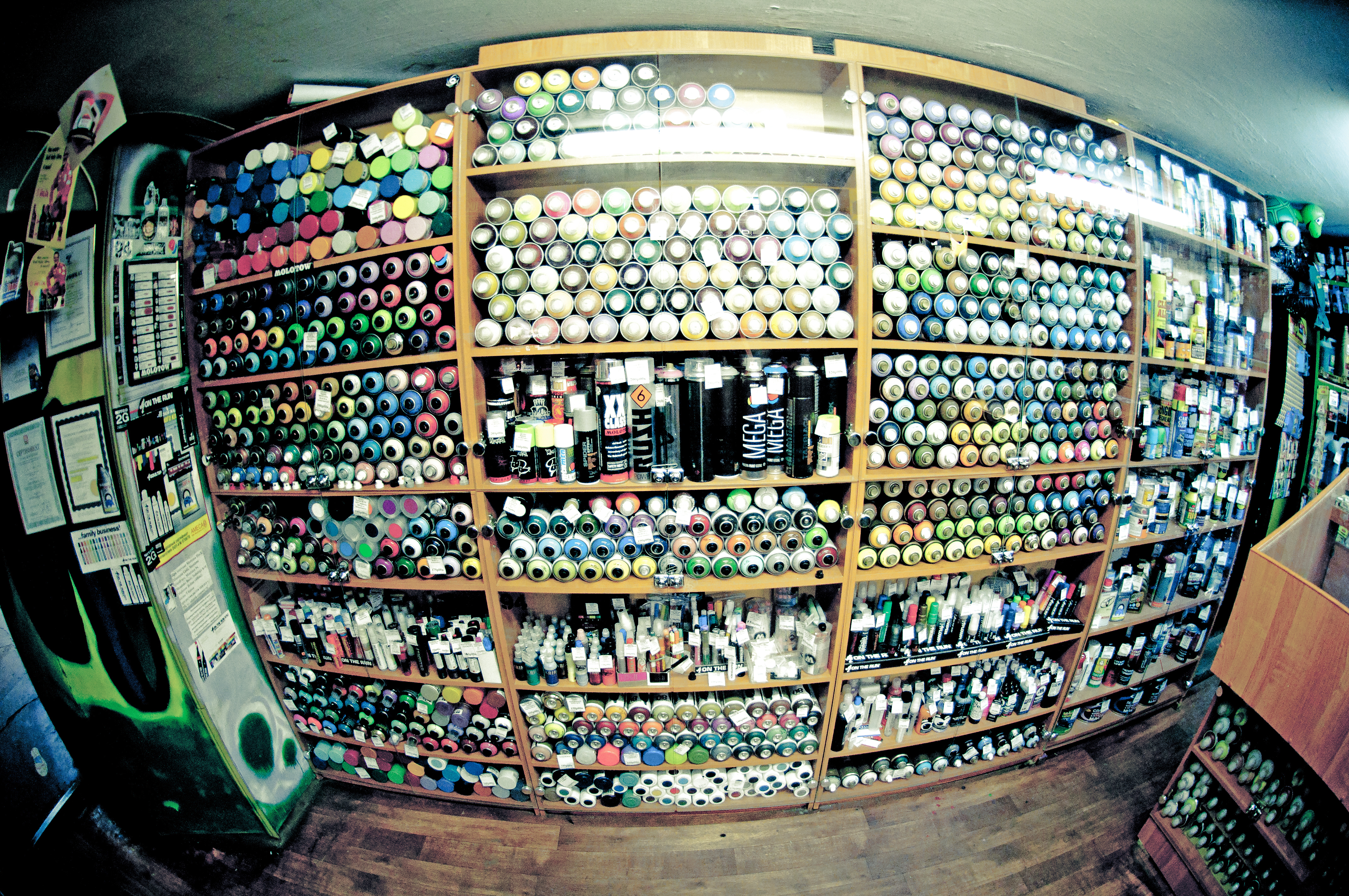
The first graffiti shop in Russia was opened in 1992 in Tver City.

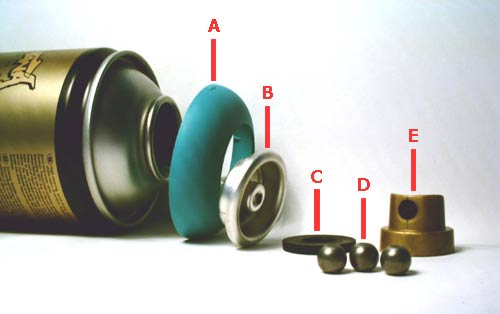
Street art style can. A) Color identity "donut"; B) Valve cup; C) Gasket for spray valve; D) Peas; E) Actuator.

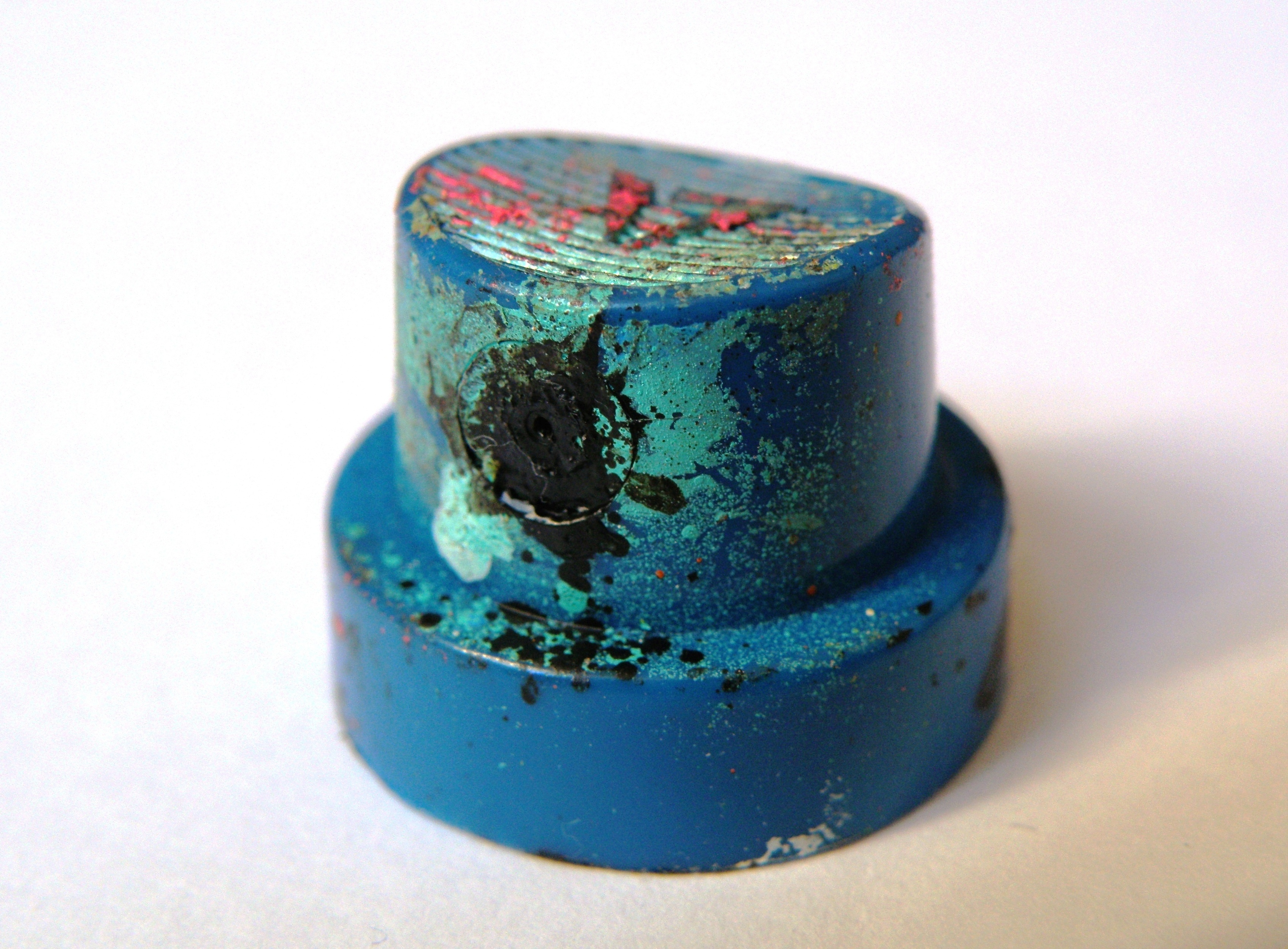
Spray paint cap after use with several paints

=== Stencils ===
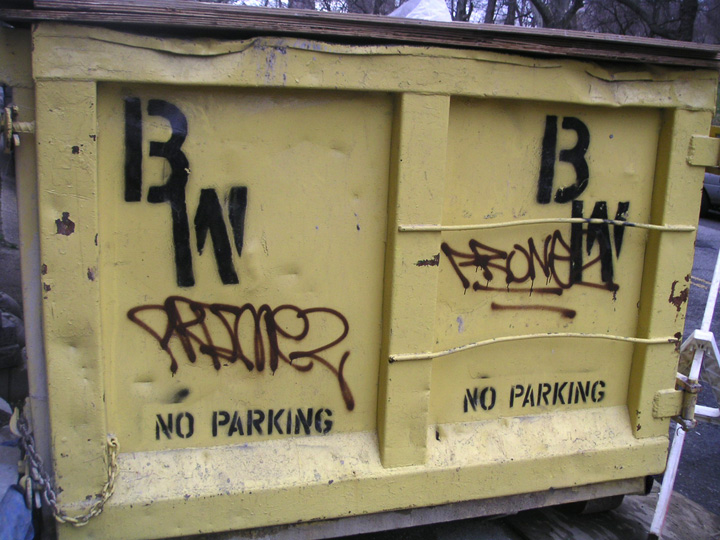
Spray paint graffiti tags on a dumpster with the owner's markings spray painted using a stencil. New York City, 2007.

When aerosol paint is used, a stencil can keep the paint constrained to one area. This protects the masked area from being covered in unwanted paint. Stencils can be purchased as movable letters, ordered as professionally cut logos, or hand-cut by artists.

Stencils can be used multiple times for recognition and consistency. Official stencils can be used to quickly and clearly label objects, vehicles or locations. Graffiti writers can use stencils to quickly mark in busy places or leave recognizable tags over a large area. Stencil artists often use multiple colors, or create elaborate stencils that are works of art in themselves.

== Environmental impact ==
When aerosol paints are dispersed into the atmosphere, volatile organic compounds and other pollutants may contribute to air pollution. Dangerous ingredients including formaldehyde, benzene, and lead are also included in aerosol paints. If these compounds are released or disposed of improperly, soil and water sources can become contaminated, endangering species and ecosystems.

Aerosol paint is not recyclable and should be emptied before discarding as they can explode risking harm to sanitation workers and pollution. This can be accomplished by fully emptying the can or with official waste management locations.

A major challenge that the aerosol spray paint industry faces includes environmental regulations meant to control VOC emissions and global warming, legal issues regarding safety labeling, and continued product abuse by graffiti artists.

== Illicit use ==
=== Graffiti ===
Unauthorized graffiti is considered to be vandalism in most jurisdictions mainly because the work or display is done without permission of the property owner. The term "aerosol art" is commonly used for displaying art form "with" permission of the property owner. The UK and many cities in the United States prohibit the sale of aerosol paint to minors as part of graffiti abatement programs. While major industrial and consumer aerosol paint companies like Krylon and Rust-Oleum actively participate in anti-graffiti programs, art-brand companies are often supportive of writers and graffiti culture, though most do not endorse illegal writing.

Graffiti is removed through four main methods. The first is pulsed laser cleaning (PLC). Some common methods include using pressurized water or chemical treatments. Another method is covering up the graffiti with a coat of paint, though this is not an ideal method since it causes heavy paint build-up and leaves an obvious patch of paint that draws the eye. When removing paint, the following factors need to be taken into account: pigment (what material(s) make up the color and opacity), binder (what holds the paint together), and solvents and additives.

=== Health and safety ===
Aerosol spray is one of many inhalants that may be abused by individuals. Abused inhalants generally fall into four categories, including volatile solvents, aerosols, gases, and nitrates. Those who abuse inhalants are at risk for heart disease, kidney disease, liver disease, and damage to the optic nerve. Some individuals experience heart failure, kidney failure, or liver failure. Death may also be caused by asphyxiation, which occurs when the inhaled substance displaces oxygen in the lungs. Spray painting has been associated with respiratory symptoms and lung function changes in exposed workers. Other dangers when using aerosol paint as an inhalant includes respiratory, eye, and nasal irritation. This can lead to illnesses that damage the lungs such as bronchitis and pulmonary edema.

== See also ==
- Graffiti
- Spray painting
- Vanishing spray
