= Alex Vallauri =

Brazilian artist (1949–1987)

- Born: Alessandro Vallauri; 9 October 1949; Asmara, Ethiopia
- Died: 27 March 1987 (aged 37); São Paulo, Brazil

Alex Vallauri (born Alessandro Vallauri; Asmara, Ethiopia, 9 October 1949 – São Paulo, 27 March 1987) was a Brazilian artist of Italian origin. Vallauri is a pioneer of street art and graffiti in the country.

== Biography ==
Vallauri moved to Brazil with his family, settling first in the seaside town of Santos, where he trained the technique of engraving - depicting people in the port of Santos - and later to the state capital. In 1965 he graduated in Visual Communication from the Fundação Armando Alvares Penteado institution, where he taught drawing a few years later. In 1975 he went to Stockholm, Sweden to specialize in Graphic Arts at Litho Art Center. Returning to Brazil in 1977, Vallauri continued to graffiti in public spaces, this time on the walls of São Paulo. At the same time he studied new ways of engraving applications, such as xerography.

Between 1982 and 1983 Vallauri went to New York to study graphic arts at the Pratt Institute. There, he met Andy Warhol, Jean-Michel Basquiat and Keith Haring. After returning to Brazil, he began to teach at FAAP. He participated in the 18th Bienal de São Paulo in 1985, with an installation, featuring his work Festa da Rainha do Frango Assado (Roasted Chicken Queen Party) and his work deserved retrospective at the Museu da Imagem e do Som in 1998.

Vallauri died of AIDS on 27 March, 1987.

== Art ==
A pioneer in the art of graffiti in Brazil, Alex used other medias besides the urban walls; he stamped shirts, badges and stickers. For him, graffiti was a form of communication that most closely matched his ideal of art for all. His preferred technique was stencilling; one of his recurring stencils was a high-heeled black boot (Bota Preta).

In the mid-1970s, his interest in kitsch objects led him to photograph tile panels painted in the 1950s and pasted on the walls of restaurants in São Paulo. His photographic records resulted in the video Arte Para Todos, shown at the International São Paulo Biennial in 1977.

== Bibliography ==
- " Alex Vallauri Graffiti", João j. Spinelli, Editora Bei, 2010, Brasil.ISBN 978-85-7850-046-7
