= Stencil graffiti =

Graffiti painted through a stencil

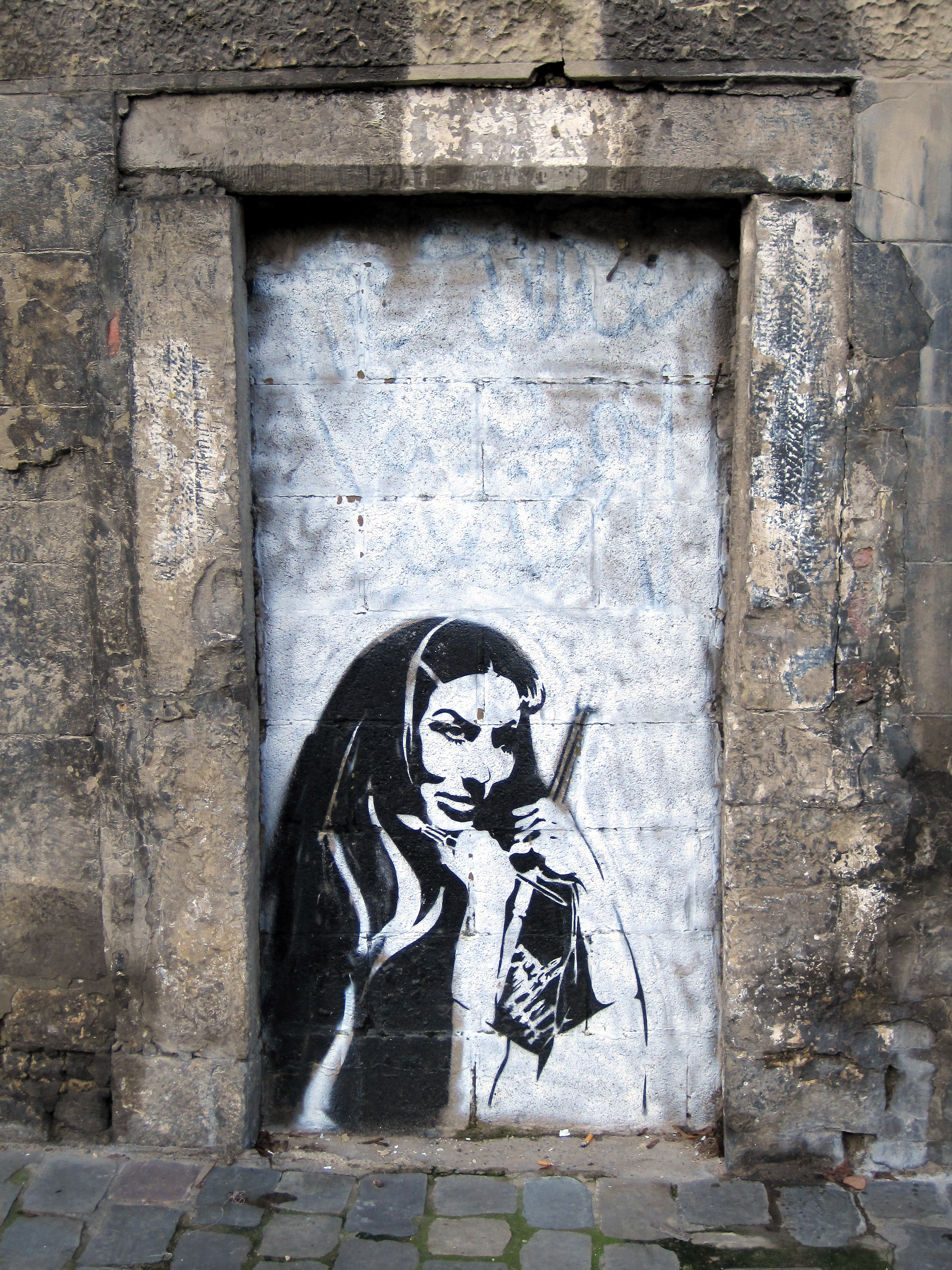
Stencil graffiti on a wall in Namur, Belgium

Stencil graffiti is a form of graffiti that makes use of stencils made out of paper, cardboard, or other media to create an image or text that is easily reproducible. The desired design is cut out of the selected medium and then the image is transferred to a surface through the use of spray paint or roll-on paint.

The process of stencilling involves applying paint across a stencil to form an image on a surface below. Sometimes multiple layers of stencils are used on the same image to add colors or create the illusion of depth.

Stencils can be done quickly. Together with being cheap and easily repeatable, the short amount of time required to paint a single stencil illegally onto a wall is a key characteristic that makes stenciling attractive.

== History ==
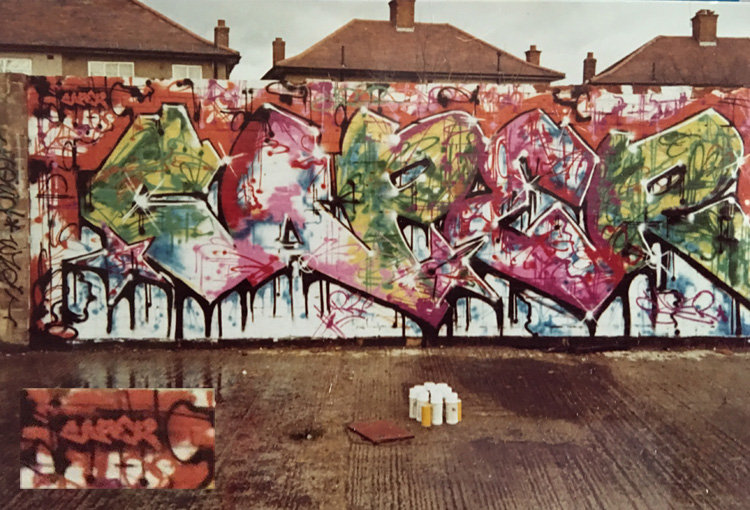
An early use of stencil for a tag name, 'Caper', around 1987, as part of a group from Hayes and Southall in London, England.

Stencil graffiti as an art form began in the 1960s. Today it is usually a part of Street Art, in style writing graffiti stencils are not used much or their use is often disguised or not valued.

French artist Ernest Pignon-Ernest stencilled life-size silhouettes of a nuclear bomb victim in the south of France in 1966 (Plateau d'Albion, Vaucluse) with paint and a brush.

Conceptual artists and other artists worked illegally with street stencils in public space since the late 1960s, among them Canadian artist group General Idea in 1969, Chaz Bojorguez in Los Angeles, who started in the same year, Polish conceptual artist Jerzy Trelinski in 1975, New York environmental conceptual artist John Fekner in 1976 or Moscow conceptualist duo SZ group in 1980.

Alex Vallauri began with stencil graffiti in his home town Sao Paulo in 1978 and was the first to start a larger stencil graffiti movement there. Vallauri's (anonymous) stencils were published in France since 1982 and had a larger impact on the New Yorker and later Polish stencil graffiti movements around David Wojnarowicz and Thomaz Sikorski.

Dutch artist Hugo Kaagman is one of the key figures of the Amsterdam punk movement. While studying social geography at the city’s municipal university, he became interested in art movements like Dada and Fluxus. He started stencil graffiti in 1978 as part of the punk movement to demonstrate against the Dutch government.

Blek le Rat claims his first spray painted stencils appeared in Paris in 1981. This early start is apparently based only on his own statements; verifiable press reports on Blek do not appear until July 1984. Blek stated he was influenced by the graffiti artists of New York City but wanted to create something of his own.

Australian photographer Rennie Ellis documented some of the earliest examples of stencil art to appear in Sydney and Melbourne in his 1985 book The All New Australian Graffiti. In the introduction to the book, Ellis noted that US photographer Charles Gatewood had written to him and sent him photographs of similar stencil graffiti that had recently appeared in New York City, leading Ellis to speculate that:

... unlike our subway-style graffiti, which is nothing more than a copy of a well-established New York tradition, the symbols of Australia and America had originated separately and unknown to each other.

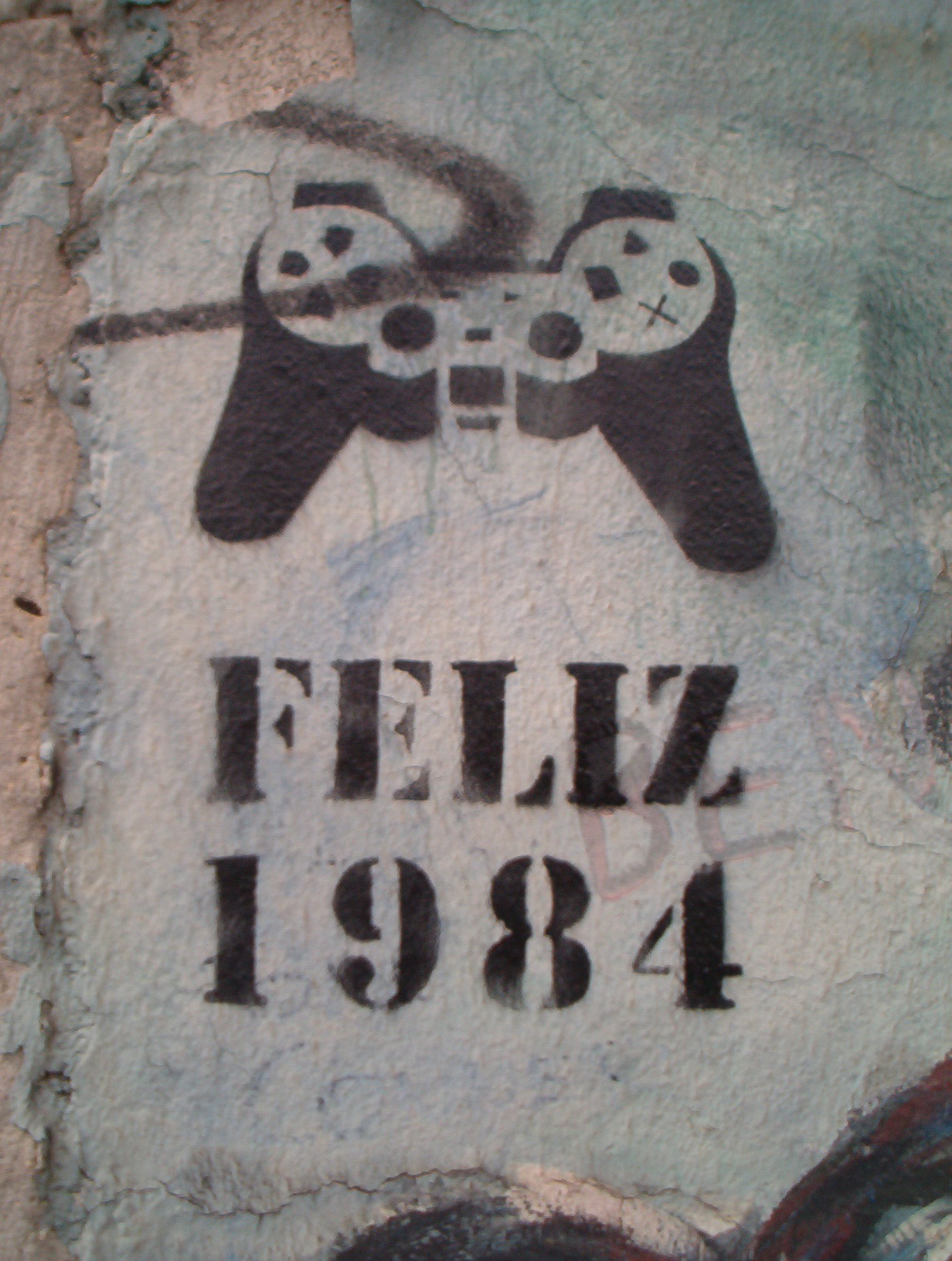
"Happy 1984", stencil graffiti of a DualShock video game controller on the Berlin Wall in 2005

Over the years this form of graffiti has become a worldwide subculture. The members are linked through the Internet and the images spray-painted on the urban canvas they place throughout the world. Many of its members connect through blogs and websites that are specifically built to display works, get feedback on posted works, and receive news of what is going on in the world of stencil graffiti.

Stencil graffiti is illegal in some jurisdictions, and many of the members of this subculture shroud their identities in aliases. Above / Tavar Zawacki, Banksy, Blek le Rat, Vhils, Shepard Fairey and Jef Aérosol are some names that are synonymous with this subculture.

== See also ==
- Glossary of graffiti
- List of stencil artists
- List of street artists
- Street art sculptures
- Street art
- Street installation
- Wheatpaste street art
- Stencil (typeface)

== Notes ==
- C215:"Stencil History X". C215, 2007. ISBN 2-9525682-2-7
- Louis Bou: "Street Art". Instituto Monsa de ediciones, S.A., 2005. ISBN 84-96429-11-3
- BTOY: "BTOY:DY:002". Belio Magazine, S.L, 2007. ISBN 84-611-4752-9
- Jinman, Richard (April 9, 2007). "Street art moves to a posh new hang-out". The Sydney Morning Herald.
- Norman, James, "Graffiti goes upmarket", The Age, Melbourne, Australia, August 16, 2003.
- Reiss, Jon, [Swindle Magazine: Issue 11] May 3, 2008
- Bello, Manuel, ["Shepard Fairey Interview."Interview with Fecal Face] 14 Aug.2007.
- Bello, Manuel ["Blek Le Rat Interview" with Fecal Face]
- Rogers, Michelle, "Jef Aerosol", Gadabout Paris, Paris, France, 2008.
- Hugo Kaagman: "Stencil King", 2009, ISBN 9789048802753.

C215 Community Service, Criteres ed. 2011
