= Tejn (artist) =

Danish artist

TEJN
- Born: 1976 (age 49–50); Denmark
- Known for: Street art, sculpture

TEJN (born 1976) is a pseudonymous Danish artist, who began his artistic work as a street artist in 2007 and occasionally exhibits contemporary art in galleries.

== Artist description ==
TEJNs gallery sculptures typically demand a more extended effort to interpret, than his street art sculptures, which he often gives a layer of a more digestible nature, allowing it to communicate with an audience passing by on foot or bike.

The highly symbolic works typically debate philosophy, politics or existentialism, suggesting a form of self-appraisal among the audience.

Based in Copenhagen, TEJN's street art has made its mark on most bigger European cities. He is best known by his trademark: "Lock Ons" which are site-specific sculptures or statues, typically welded in recycled iron and chained in the street without permission, often mounted to urban furniture with a bicycle lock. His second most preferred media is paintings on paper, pasted up with wheatpaste on a wall. TEJN also makes installations, stencil-art, and conceptual art.

== Technique ==
TEJN finds metal scrap for his sculptures in urban areas and uses some of it in its original form. The rest is shaped and welded into figurative objects that express a narrative deadopen for interpretation.

The iron is later "given back to the street" as street sculptures, in the same areas where he originally collected the material.

== Examples of artworks/interventions ==
=== 2007 ===
- TEJN places an unknown number of hidden time capsules in different Danish cities, containing original works commenting on the way we look at future, past and present. The time capsules were signed, sealed and buried or integrated in public areas or buildings without permission.
- Wheat pasted drawings appears in the streets, accompanied by messages playing with the Danish language, transforming and illustrating song titles and old sayings, such as "Time Heals all Wounds" transformed into "Time Stores all Wounds", etc.

=== 2008 ===
- First large roof top paste up

=== 2009 ===
- One of Those Noah Didn't Get on the Boat – a wheat paste series of various non-existing animals "that Noah didn't manage to save", appears in Copenhagen and in small towns in the Christian west coast of Jutland
- Street sculptures appear in seaports showing variations of the same theme, such as a woman sitting on a whaling cannon loaded with an anchor

=== 2011 ===
- Vultures Always Wins the War – Installation containing a wall showcasing spray-painted attacking bombers throwing exploding peace signs, undisturbed by a large iron vulture on top of the wall, observing the process.

=== 2012 ===
- The Ego Coin Project – Conceptual work that questioned egocentric consumption of goods. The artist issued approximately €500 worth of modified valid coins earmarked for non-profitable purposes. The coins were engraved with the word EGO and then given away. The coins are supposed to be used to benefit new recipients other than the current owner.
- In a small city forest threatened by urban planners, a 200-pound revolver welded in iron was chained to one of the trees, carrying the stencil text: “My Ancestors Went Hunting in These Woods”.

=== 2013 ===
- Omnivorous (street sculpture) – Goat with its head stuck in a McDonald's bag, chained in front of the Danish government building.
- Victory (street sculpture) – Character freeing itself by cutting its chain with a bolt cutter – placed in front of Frihedsmuseet, the Museum of Danish Resistance during WW2

=== 2014 ===
- Captain Queer (street sculpture) Proud looking sailor with rainbow shoulder sleeve insignia and anchor on the chest is chained in Copenhagen's new square, "The Rainbow Square", as a tribute to diversity and the achievements the LGBT movement have reached so far.

== Exhibitions ==
=== 2013 ===
- Exhibition in Lunchmoney Gallery, Aarhus, Denmark
- Art exhibition "WAR" at The Manor of Hvidkilde, BLANK FOBI Gallery.
- Art exhibition at Helligåndshuset, art community MULT, Copenhagen.
- Lecture in Activist Art "Art Across", Copenhagen.
- Art exhibition "New Artworks in the collection" at art museum KØS, Køge.
- Week of Art, Faaborg.
- Art exhibition "Galore 2013" at Valby kulturhus, Copenhagen.
- Art exhibition "Gaden gir..." at The Manor of Hvidkilde, BLANK FOBI Gallery.
- Art Exhibition "Urban Art Clash" at PLATOON KUNSTHALLE, Berlin.
- Art exhibition at Art Herning in collaboration with Lunchmoney Gallery, Herning.
- Art exhibition "Best Before" in Lunchmoney Gallery, Aarhus, Denmark

=== 2012 ===
- Street Art The New Generation, Brandts Museum of Art, Odense.
- Galore Underground Art Festival, Copenhagen
- Absence of a Leader, Cafe Morgenrot, Berlin
- Stroke Urban Art Fair, München, Praterinsel
- "Welded Attitudes" in Lunchmoney Gallery, Aarhus.

=== 2011 ===
- Exhibition in Galleri Helvetikat, Copenhagen.
- Exhibition Galore 2011 i Valby kulturhus.
- Street Art Calendar, With Streetheart Cph.
- Street Art workshop for art teachers.
- Sculpture and painting sponsoreret to The Danish House in Palestine.
- Exhibition in Gallery Levins Hus, Faaborg.
- Installation "Ymerbrønden Flyttes" i Faaborg.
- Exhibition Walk This Way at KØS Kunstmuseum, Museum of Modern Art, Køge, Denmark.
- Exhibition in Gallery Helvetikat, CPH.
- ExhibitionBN Post it up Beneventi, Italy.

=== 2010 ===
- Exhibition in Gallery Helvetikat, Cph.
- Interactive multiethnic art- and cultureprojekt "Ungebazar" in Odense Bazar.
- Street art kalender by Streetheart, Cph.
- Grafisc street art calendar in tunnel under Østerbrogade by Helvetikat, Cph.
- "Ode til Kastanjen", illustration for book about Enghave Plads, Cph.
- "Street Art Calendar '11" release-fernisage at Gallery Rumkammerat by Katrine Ring, Cph.
- Exhibition "Puls Plus" in Kunstbygningen Filosofgangen, Odense, Denmark.
- Paste-up Workshop "Street Art Days" in Tapperiet, Køge.
- Decorating walls at the reopening of Stengade 30, Cph.
- Pink Army "Artist Collaboration Against War" at Bolsjefabrikken, Cph.
- Exhibition "Familiealbum" at Gallery Rumkammerat, Cph.
- Exhibition "Galore 2010" in Valby Kulturhus.
- Sponsor-art for Dansk Firmaidræt v. Jette Dam.
- "Streetheart beats" at Enghave Plads by Streetheart, Cph.
- Exhibition "Kredsløb" at Gallery Helvetikat, Cph.
- "Street Art Calendar '10" – by Katrine Ring, Kbh.

=== 2009 ===
- Interaktive art-Exhibition "Play Along" at Gallery Rumkammerat, Cph.
- Artprojekt "Wild at Westend" v. Galleri Rumkammerat, Cph.
- Exhibition "Galore 2009" at Valby Kulturhus.

== Gallery ==
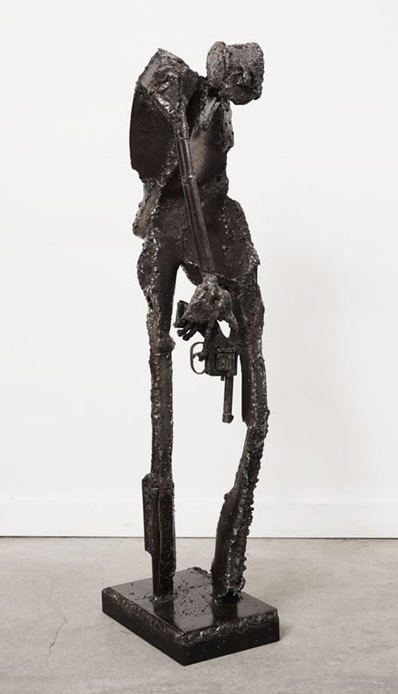
Iron sculpture

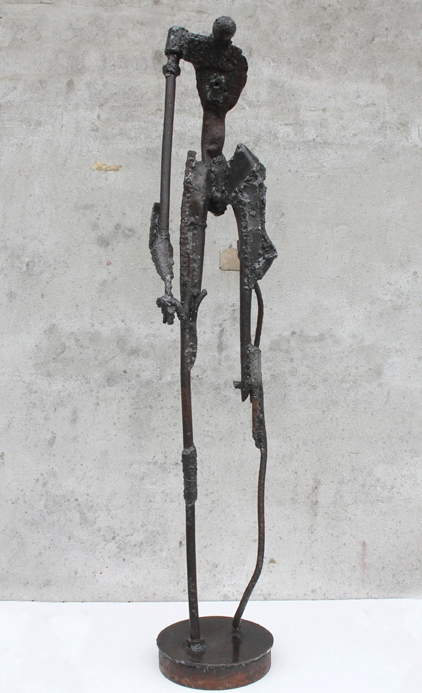
Iron sculpture

== See also ==
- Banksy, English graffiti artist whose name is also unknown
- Shepard Fairey, well known for his Obey Giant campaign and his Obama Hope poster
- Revs, Underground street artist from NY
- ABOVE – multi colour stencils, large word play paintings and hanging arrows
- Invader – Mostly known for his Pixel Invasion of creatures from the video game: Space Invaders
- Graffiti terminology
- Lock on street sculptures
- Stencil
- Street art
- Street installation
- List of street artists
