= Adam Cost =

American artist

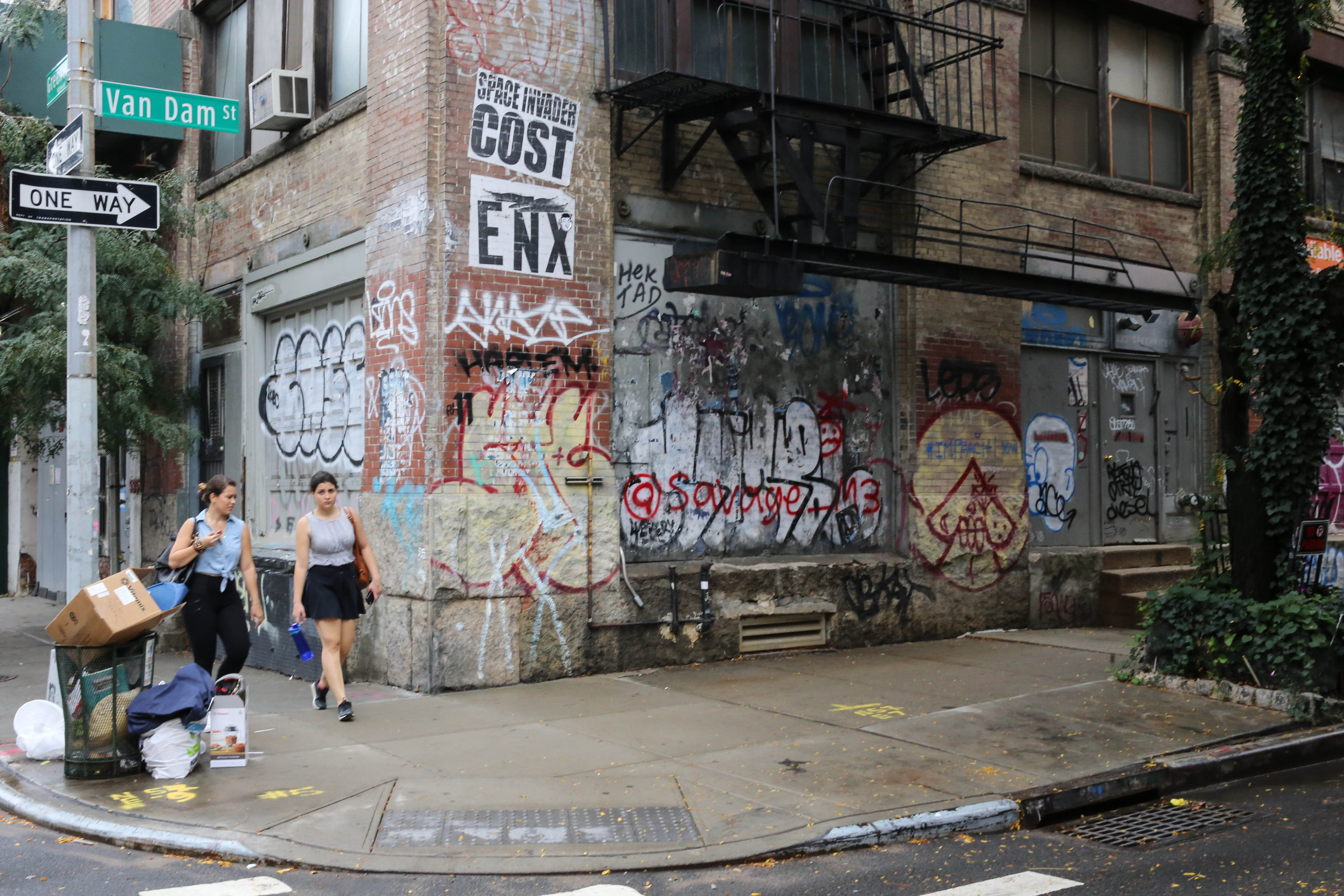
- Cost, Space Invader and ENX wheatpastes on Vandam Street, Hudson Square, New York
- Born: Adam Cole; 1969 (age 56–57)
- Style: wheatpaste and paint-roller pieces
- Movement: Graffiti
- Website: Adam Cost on Instagram

Cost is the tag name of a graffiti writer who, from the early 1980s to the late 2000s, blanketed New York City and the surrounding metropolitan area with his wheatpaste stickers, spray paint tags and paint-roller pieces.

In the 1990s, Cost collaborated with fellow New York graffiti artist Revs.

== Graffiti career ==
Cost and Revs became well known in the early 1990s, when, on any given block in Manhattan, a passerby could spot the duo’s wheat paste tags posted on the back of the Walk/Don't Walk street-crossing signal. On these wheat pasted papers, Cost and Revs printed in bold black ink intentionally obscure messages such as Cost fucked Madonna or Suicide Revs. Later they collaborated on large, bold roller pieces on highly visible walls, subway embankments, and advertising boards.

When asked in 1993 by a New York Times Style reporter what it all meant, Cost said, "If you could give us [Cost and Revs] the meaning of life, I’d give you the meaning of us." At that time the posters included a phone number; those who called heard a woman's recorded voice repeat their questions back to them: "My intuition tells me that you're asking yourselves who are Revs and Cost and what are they doing? What is it? What does it mean? What does it mean? What does it mean?"

Cost and Revs were responsible for many highly visible examples of the graffiti that Mayor Rudolph Giuliani was determined to eradicate. One letter writer called Cost "probably the worst graffiti vandal in the history of New York."

In October 2010, Cost released a collection of four limited edition t-shirt styles with fashion retailer Supreme. The t-shirts were sold in the United States and Japan.

== Arrest ==
In 1995, Cost was caught by police tagging a mailbox. In court, the judge estimated that Cost had done over $100 million in damages. Cost was fined $2,126, ordered to do 200 days community service removing graffiti, and forced to seek psychological counseling. That run-in with the law eventually led to Cost’s temporary bowing out of the graffiti scene. Upon his comeback, Cost reestablished himself as a forerunner within NYC street art culture, as well as becoming a household name internationally within the art genre.

== Comeback ==
Starting in 2010 Cost made a return to the streets, once again covering the city with wheatpaste stickers. In 2011 Cost began solely working with street artist ENX. The duo also collaborated with street artist Invader in 2013.
