= Lock On (street art) =

Street art genre

Lock On is a genre of street art, where artists create installations by attaching sculptures to public furniture using lengths of chain and old bike locks. The installations themselves are referred to as "a Lock On" (singular) or "Lock Ons" (plural).

== Style ==
A Lock On is art in a public space, typically attached to a fence or street lamp with some sort of padlock, without permission. The Lock On style is a "non-destructive" form of underground art.

== Artists ==
- REVS is the tag name of a New York City graffiti artist whose sculpture, wheat paste stickers and roller pieces have earned him a reputation of an artist provocateur. In New York, steel sculptures created with construction-grade steel and spelling "Revs" can be found around Brooklyn and Lower Manhattan.
- TEJN is considered the "founder" of the Lock On phrase. Taking scrap metal from urban areas, TEJN welds and shapes the iron into figurative sculptures which he "returns to the street" as site-specific art secured with chain or an old bike lock. The genre was introduced when he started placing welded iron sculptures, chained and locked, throughout Copenhagen and Berlin.
- The peace organisation Pink Army places pink war toys in selected urban areas as part of their "war against war".
- Street artists In Portland, Oregon have chained toy horses to old metal rings, formerly used for tying real horses.

== Technique ==
Lock On street sculptures can be made from various materials like wood, plastic, clay, concrete, iron, styrofoam or polystyrene. Typically a part of the concept is to re-use found materials. In some cases the materials are released in the same neighborhood where it was originally collected, now upcycled into sculptures, following the thought of improving cityscape by the use of materials that used to impair the very same area.

The locks used when mounting street sculptures are, in some cases, dismounted from broken bikes, found nearby.

== Gallery ==
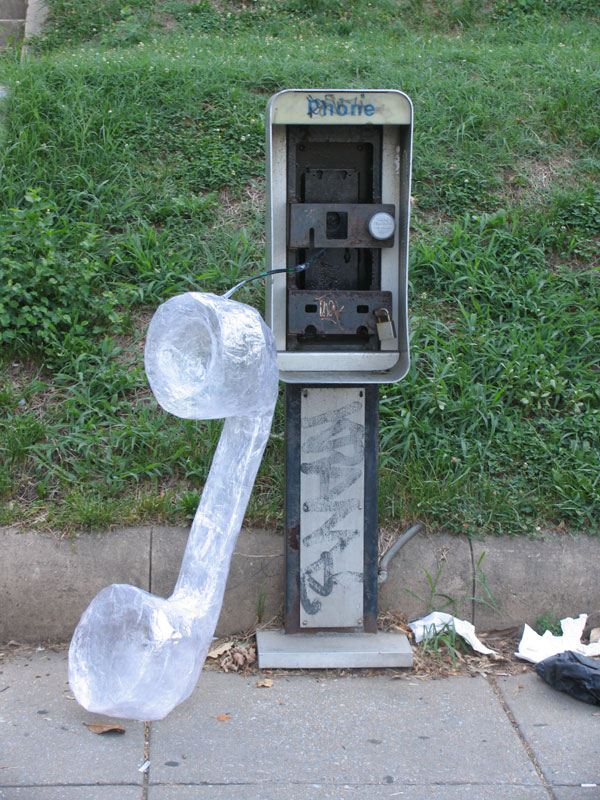
Sculpture installation by Mark Jenkins

== See also ==
- List of street artists
- Public art
- Reclaim the Streets
- Street art in Melbourne
- Street poster art
- Wooster Collective
