= Street poster art =

Kind of graffiti

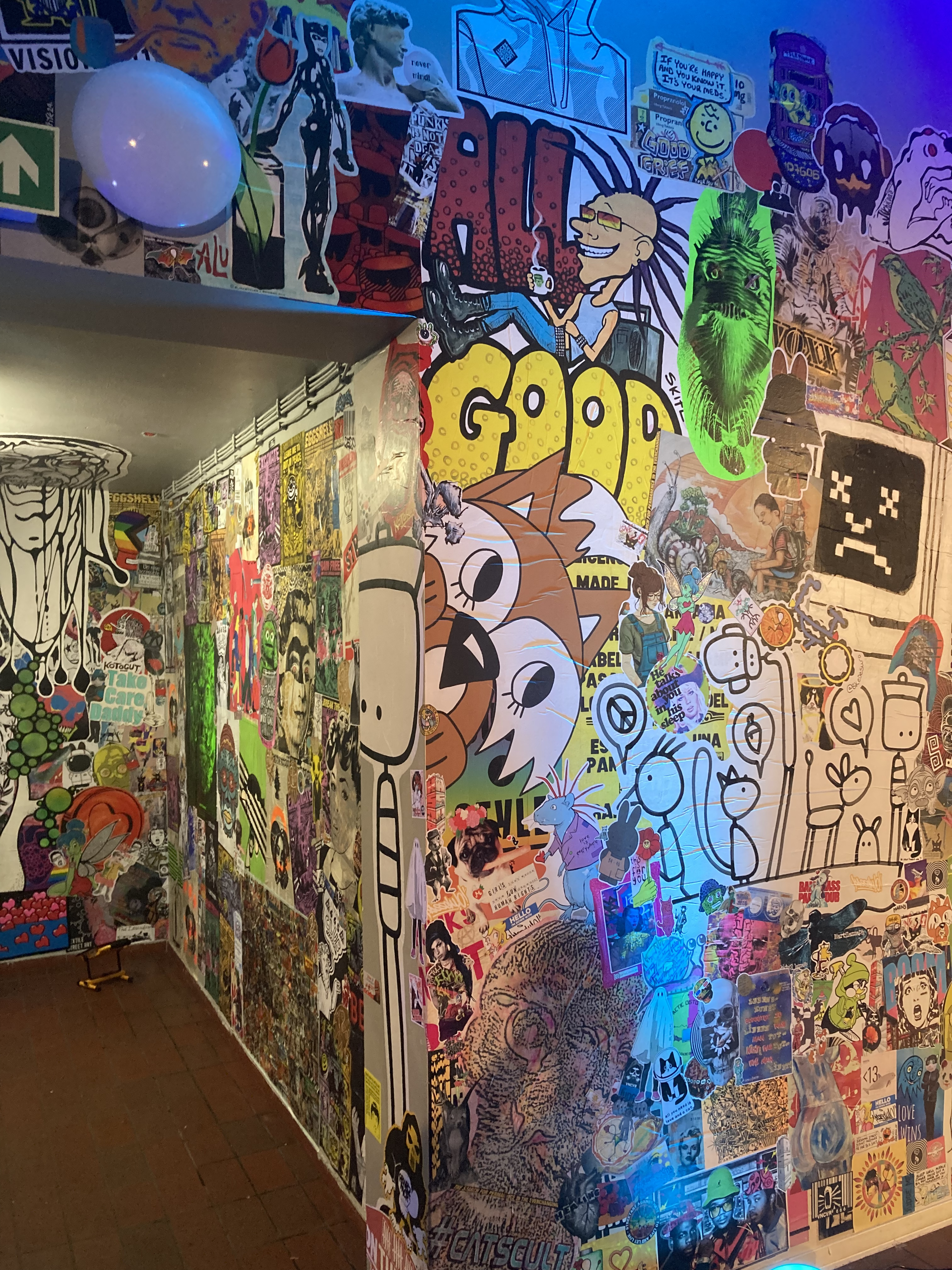
Pasteups at International Pasteup Fest Marl, Germany, 2025

Street poster art is a kind of street art usually handmade or printed graphics on thin paper typically applied to surfaces via wheatpaste, wallpaper adhesive or PVA. It can be understood as an art piece that is installed on the streets as opposed to in a gallery or museum, but by some it is not considered as a form of contemporary art.

Viral diffusion of messages and the ability to reach every part of society are core concepts for street poster artists.

== Exhibitions and Festivals ==
This medium of street art is frequently celebrated via exhibitions and festivals around the world, typically offering international artists within the scene the opportunity to exhibit their work in other counties alongside a host of artists from varying regions of the globe operating in the same medium.

Notable festivals include the International Pasteup Fest Marl; StickeRomExpo; Zagreb Street Art Festival; Berlin Paste Up and Pasteup Festival France.

== Gallery ==
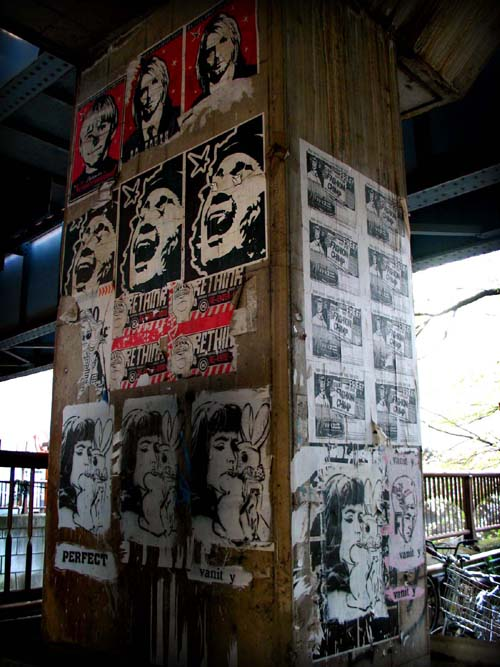
Nakameguro, Tokyo, Japan

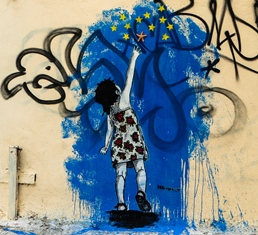
Work by Bleepsgr in Athens

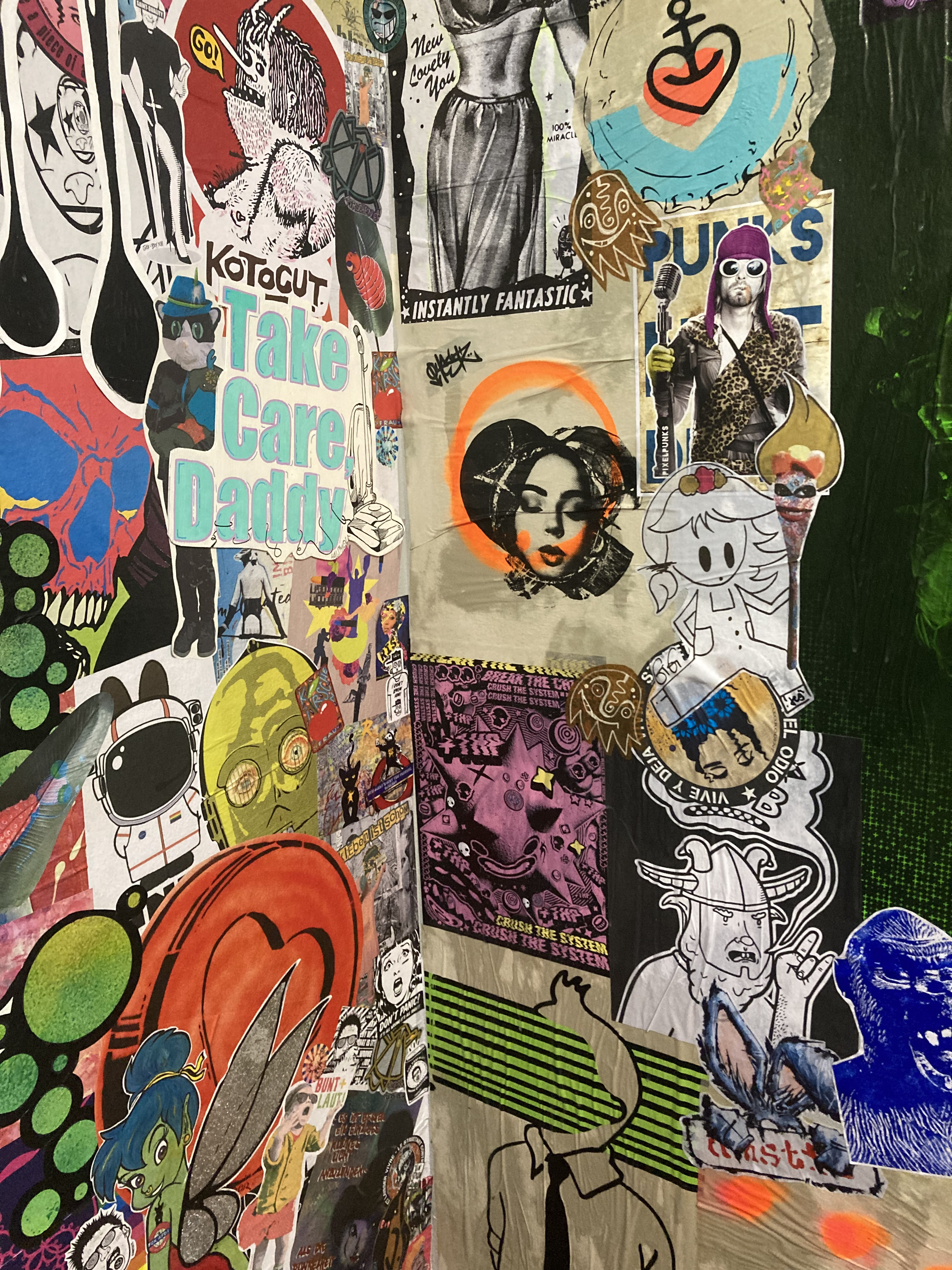
Pasteups at the Hagenbusch (Marl, Germany) by international artists including OHMY, Zombiesqueegee, Carl Stimpson, ShallowLagoon, Yaya, PixelPunks and more, 2025.

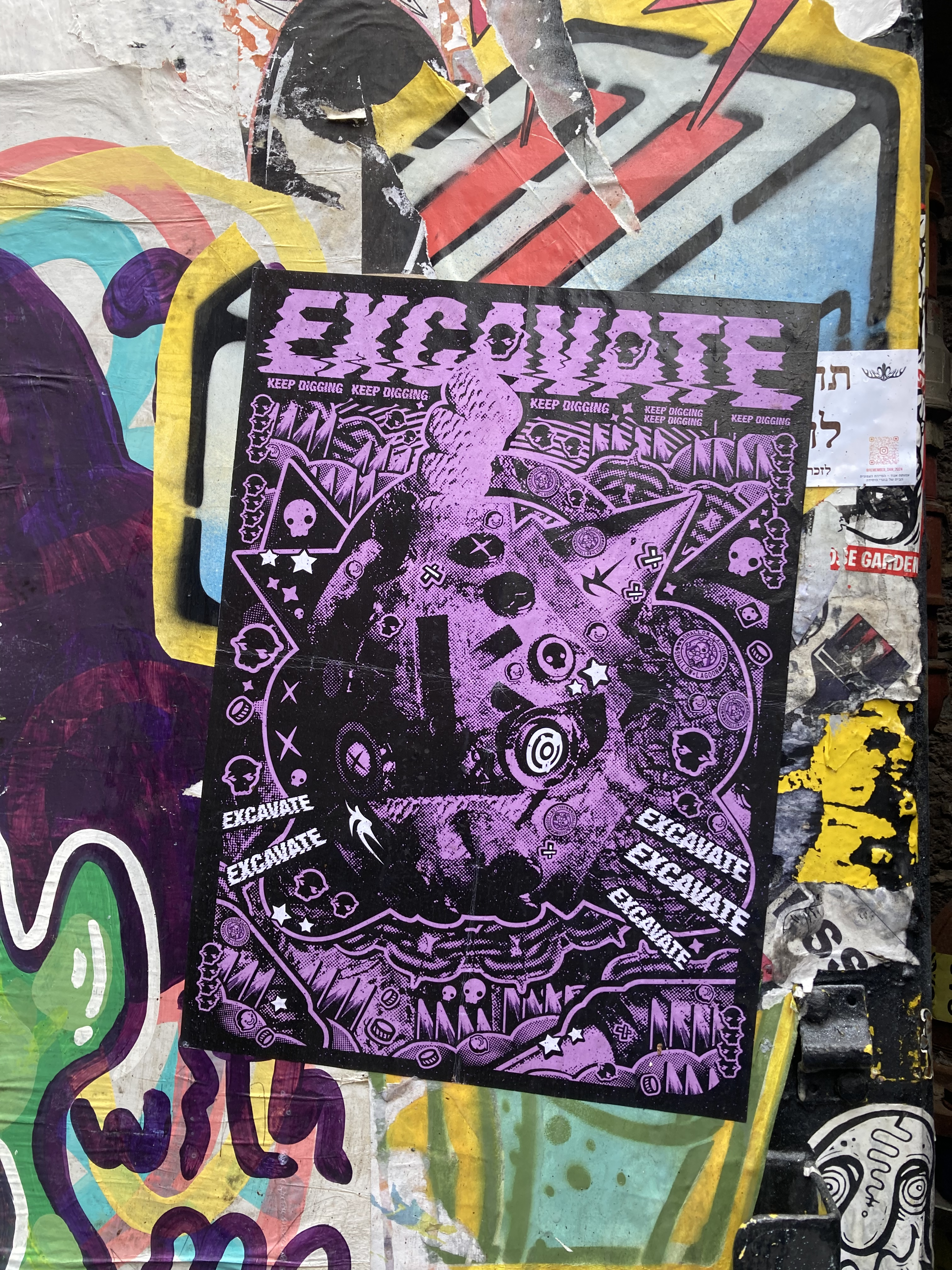
Pasteup in London by ShallowLagoon, 2025

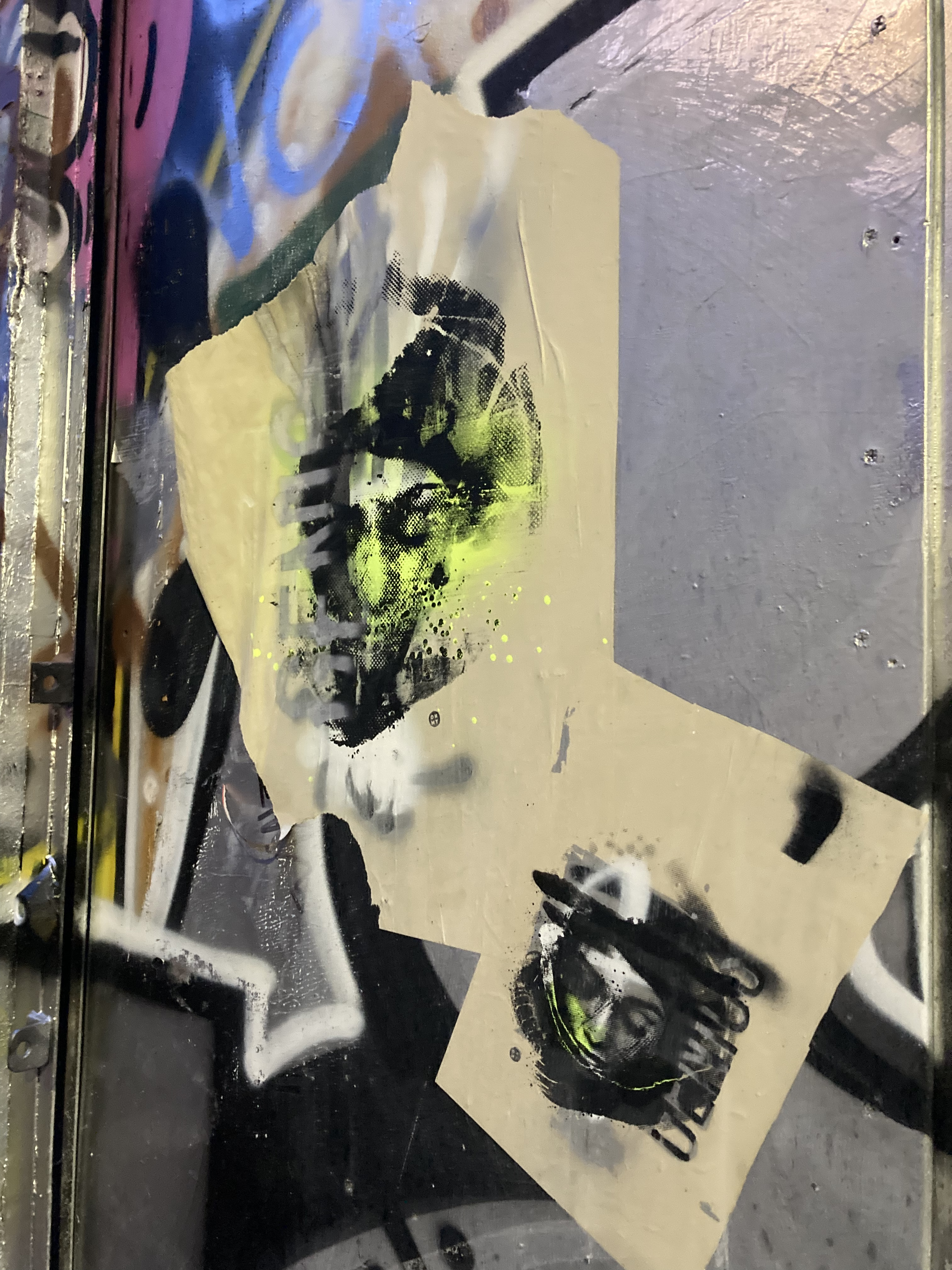
Posters in Shoreditch by artist OHMY, 2025

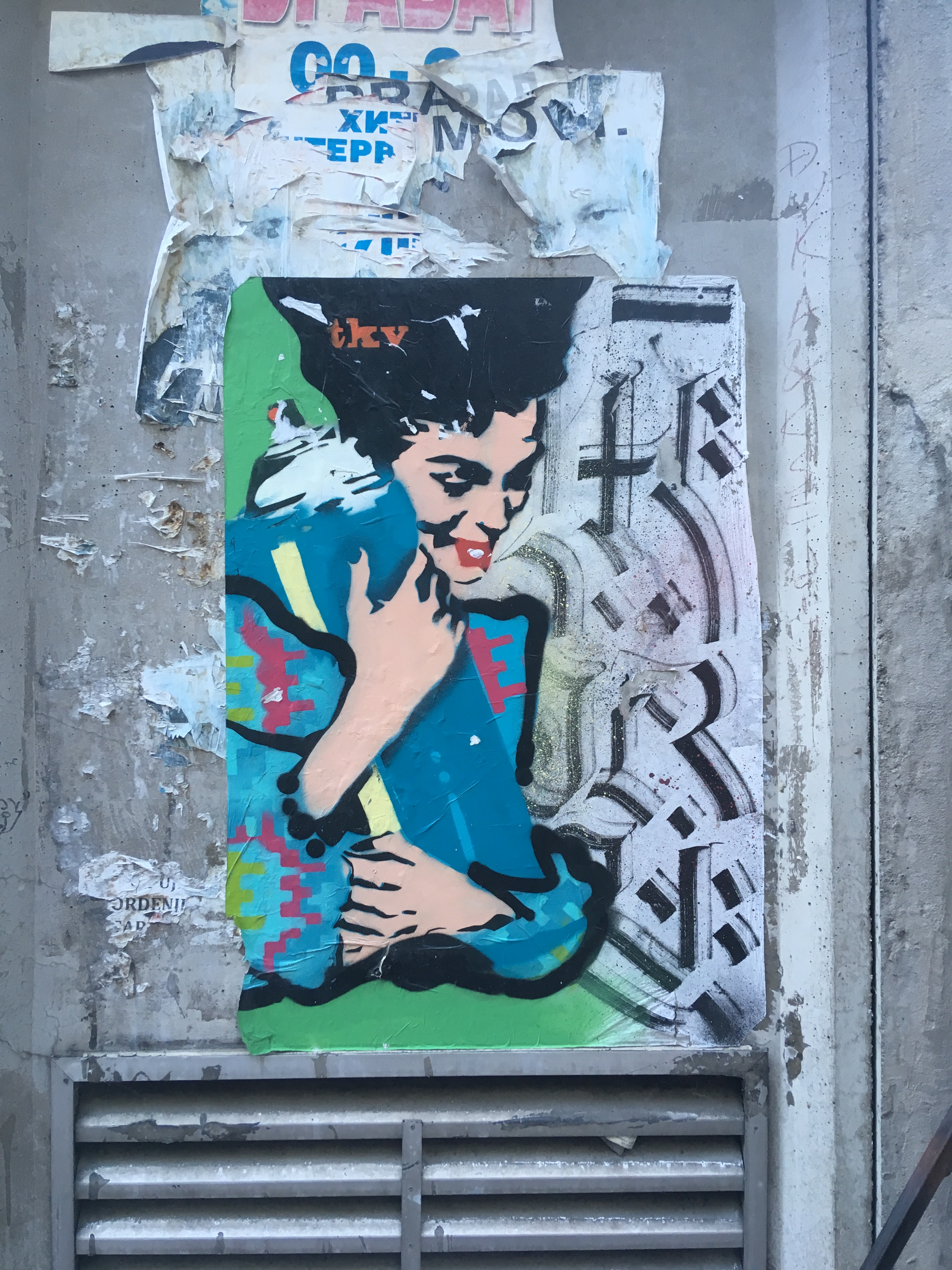
TKV in Belgrade, 2019

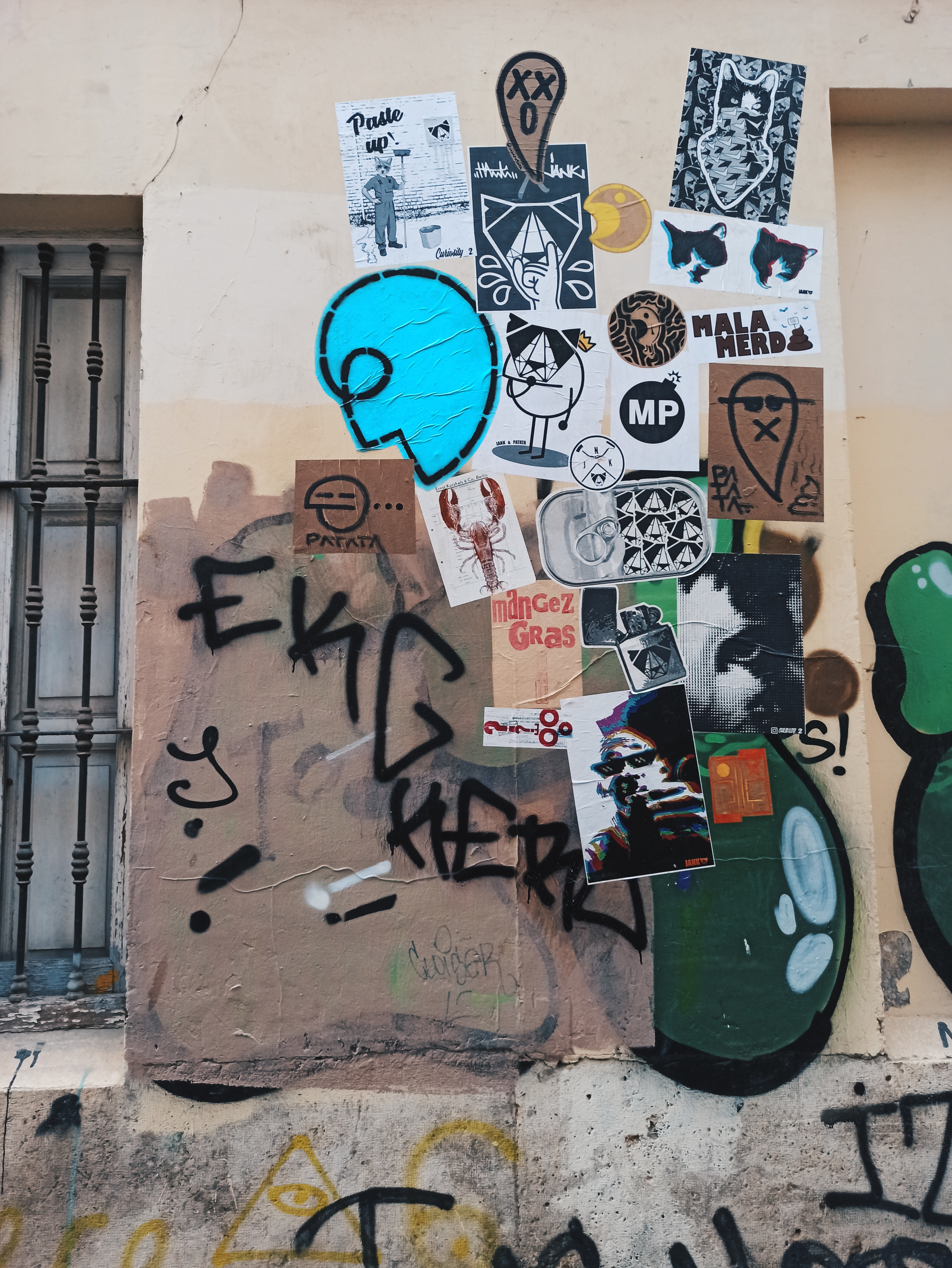
Street poster combo in Valencia, Spain

== See also ==
- Flyposting
- Graffiti terminology
- List of street artists
- Street art sculptures
- Stencil street art
- Street art
- Street installation
