= Route 66 Park =

Park in Missouri, U.S.

Route 66 Mural Park
- Interactive map of Route 66 Mural Park
- Type: Municipal
- Location: Joplin, Missouri
- Coordinates: 37°5′4.85″N 94°30′47.45″W
- Created: 2013
- Operator: Joplin Area Chamber of Commerce, City of Joplin Parks and Recreation
- Status: Open year-round, rain or shine
- Mural artists: Chris Auckerman, Jon White

Route 66 Mural Park (opened 2013 in Joplin, Missouri) operates as a public park, specifically as a touchstone for US Route 66 tourists as well as for local preservers of U.S. Route 66 in Missouri. The park includes three large tile murals proposed by Paul Whitehill, produced by Images In Tile USA and designed by artists Chris Auckerman, Carthage, MO native Andy Thomas, and Jon White. The park also features a bifurcated red sports car that anyone on pilgrimage can slide up beside and have a quickie photograph taken. Close to the intersection of 7th Street and Main, the mural covers the south side of the now closed Pearl Brothers, the iconic green hardware store of downtown Joplin. Near that same intersection, US Route 66 once shifted west and headed into Kansas.

== History ==
During the 1960s and 1970s, urban renewal was demolishing one historical building after another in the downtown district of Joplin, but there were some benefits of the renewal. In 1970, city planners wedged a small park called "Mall Park" between some of the major 7th street buildings. The park connected a large back-alley parking lot to the downtown district, shifting the focus from wheel traffic to foot traffic and making the high-rise merchandising stores more accessible to any who parked off of the main drag.

Over time, the intricate brickwork of this park began to deteriorate and work was required to breathe new life into once heavily trafficked public space.

Paul Whitehill proposed the idea to create a Route 66 mural for Joplin to Chris Auckerman and Jon White of Images in Tile USA's art department. After much thought and planning, vision became art. Local sponsors assembled and helped them design the lower mural for tourists and visitors as a memorable photo opportunity, one that captures Joplin's place on Route 66. Europeans make the trek across Route 66 every year and even more for the festivals – 15,000 visitors from 25 states and 14 countries came to Joplin, Missouri, Springfield, Missouri, and other towns along the route simply for the Route 66 International Festival. Other photo opportunities like the mural park have cropped up in the wake of the growing trend.

This trend may have come about through the 2006 release of the animated film Cars which tossed a spotlight upon the country-wide effort to both save and restore local U.S. Route 66 main street businesses in any town that was bypassed and forgotten during the interstate system shift. Though big enough in population to withstand the effects of I-44 interstate pulling business both south and east of the city's historic hub, Joplin was affected in a parallel manner to the tiny mining and tourist towns that once peppered the landscape of Route 66 – primarily through the surge of national chains like Walmart and McDonald's that neutered the reach of mom-and-pop shops. Through renewed interest in the Mother Road, international media coverage of the 2011 Joplin tornado, and its ongoing underground art revival, Joplin's downtown got its groove back. All of the downtown murals track this progress.

After years of planning, the city dedicated Route 66 Mural Park during the first Third Thursday of the 2013 season. Once they had affixed the murals to Pearl Brothers, they dedicated them at the international Route 66 festival during the seventh season of Joplin's Third Thursday art walk. The public park had been neglected for twenty years. The site features a large mockup of a 45 record cut into the walkway, the center of which swaps out to accommodate the divergent spirits of various special events. A concrete slab nearby has been retrofitted into an all-weather map of the four states, with an emphasis on Missouri, Kansas, and Oklahoma. They marked the entrance by a retaining wall with a clean-cut emboss reading "Route 66 Joplin, Missouri." A string of Route 66 tile murals will span the winding path from up in Chicago all the way down to Santa Monica, but Joplin received the first in the series.
