= Leon Reid IV =

American street artist (born 1979)

Verbs
- Leon IV at work in São Paulo, Brazil, 2007
- Born: Leon Reid IV; September 18, 1979 (age 46)
- Education: Central Saint Martins
- Style: Street installation
- Movement: Graffiti
- Website: leonthe4th.com

Leon Reid IV, also known as VERBS and Darius Jones (born September 18, 1979), is an American artist widely credited as being among the pioneers of 21st-century street art. His brief creative output is marked by numerous phases, several of which are known by separate alter-egos.

== Early graffiti in Cincinnati ==
Leon IV began writing graffiti in Cincinnati, Ohio, in 1995, at the age of 15. He was attracted to the traditional uses of spray paint, markers, wildstyle lettering and black-book culture as first developed by graffiti writers in Philadelphia and New York City a quarter of a century earlier.

Leon IV chose VERBS as his tag by watching a video by underground hip-hop group The Nonce. "I saw this fat guy rapping on T.V.... he had a big black sweatshirt that read "VERBS" in the middle of it...I badly needed a name and for some reason it seemed to have the right feel " He said in conversation.

As VERBS, Leon IV engaged in numerous street-bombing missions (graffiti made on urban infrastructure typically at night) with his friend MERZ, also a young graffiti writer. Street bombing, the dominant vehicle of graffiti expression after the era of New York City train writing ended in the late 1980s, could be just as dangerous as train writing.

One night after painting graffiti on a rooftop with MERZ, Leon IV fell off the side of a building while descending its back wall. A sharp object in the alley below made a laceration in his left leg on impact, for which he "still bears the scar" he claimed in an off-the-record statement.

== Proto-street art/ VERBS ==
NYC Subway installation

The late 1990s brought waves of graffiti artists through Cincinnati by way of Scribble Jam, an annual hip-hop festival held in August. Among the most influential visiting artists was Philadelphia writer Stephen Powers.

Leon IV began to adopt ESPO's recent strategy of applying illegal graffiti in daylight, while absorbing the tactics of advert manipulation as developed by Ron English, and graffiti writers Barry Mcgee and Kaws. As a result, Leon IV consolidated his influences into a functioning street installation program by placing road signs and altered adverts in broad daylight under the guise of a city-ordained construction worker.

Pivotal to the new process was Leon IV's childhood friend and artist Andre Hyland (a.k.a. Buddy Lembeck) who participated in these initial street installations and added a white construction hard hat to the disguise. A reflective vest would be added to the costume after Leon IV's stay in Brooklyn.

== New York period/Darius Jones ==
Fleur D'acier #3, New York City

Leon IV's move to Brooklyn, New York, in 1998 proved transitional. While attending Pratt Institute he met film students Quenell Jones and Brad Downey. The pair were interested in filming a documentary (later titled Public Discourse) on the burgeoning New York City street-art scene and asked Leon IV if he would be their first subject. With Leon IV's approval, the three became a street-art trio, often executing and filming installations simultaneously. After months behind the camera, Downey began assisting in Leon IV's installations and gradually shifted gears from documentarian to street artist.

"Brad soon found himself working alongside Leon, eventually donning a costume himself...Leon remembered exactly how it felt to be new to the scene, how hard it was to learn the ropes and secrets...So he willingly took Brad under his wing. He shared all of his years of experience, all the trials and errors, never making Brad pay his dues to nearly the degree expected of him earlier in his own career."

As Ed Zipco writes in The Adventures of Darius and Downey. Thames & Hudson, 2008.

While on summer break (2000) in Cincinnati, Leon IV made a drastic creative decision. He put a complete end to writing VERBS, and at the suggestion of friend Andre Hyland, began signing his new works under the pen-name Darius Jones (a fake name he gave to a reporter when interviewed as VERBS). The new vein of work was characterized by sweeping roller-paint graffiti laced with positive and witty messages. The artist Swoon recalled:

"In one conversation with Darius, he told me how he realized there was already so much negativity in the city, especially within the public's perception of graffiti." [he said] "Why don't we try to make something that is big and illegal and positive?"

== Style shift ==
As Darius Jones, Leon IV developed a, lyrical, romantic quality that separated further from his work as VERBS. Moreover, he leaped from a primarily aerosol-based genre to work increasingly with steel, pushing the limits of three-dimensional street art, a then scantly explored possibility of the art form, with the exception of J.J. Veronis and Revs.

Furthermore, by providing official titles to his illegal works, such as Fleur D'acier and The Kiss, Leon IV urged the public to consider street art as more than a random act of vandalism. On his return to Brooklyn, he shared his new developments with Downey who by then had become a practicing street artist.

== London period ==
The Kiss, London

In the fall of 2003, Leon IV moved to London to attend graduate studies at Central Saint Martins College of Art and Design. Downey made the move to England as well and the two resumed their street collaborations from a distinctly British standpoint. This period in both the output of Leon IV and Downey is noted for a highly subversive approach to street art.

Last year, sharp-eyed Londoners may have noticed a three-foot high sheet metal figure painted green in the classic pedestrian crossing pose, looking for all the world like it was about to cross Tottenham Court Road...Meanwhile Bristolians may have come across a metal sculpture of a spider installed on a bricked-up window of an unoccupied house...Even fewer people will know who is behind these and many more unsigned sculptures- two American artists now operating in the UK, Darius and Downey.

wrote Gavin Lucas for London design magazine Creative Review (2004). When curator Scott Burnham asked him to comment further on his creative process for British-based ICON magazine, Leon IV stated:

"I occasionally stumble upon an area so devoid of either life or humour that I have an incredible urge to contribute something. This is when I take pictures of the area, study them and develop a piece around what exactly is missing from the space. I look at it like a tailor measuring a client to make the best fitting suit, or a doctor examining a patient to prescribe the right medication."

Due to their similarities in style, Leon IV and Downey are referred to collectively as Darius and Downey, first in European and British press.

== Current phase ==
Leon IV's approach to art changed once again upon his return to Brooklyn in early 2005. He continued to make street art but increasingly accepted credit under his legal name before grinding to a complete halt in all illicit installations – effectively ending his work as Darius Jones and the Darius and Downey partnership.

The swift change, similar to his detachment from VERBS, caught a number of street-art enthusiasts by surprise. In an article appearing in The Post-Standard entitled "Brooklyn artist is legal in Syracuse", Leon IV briefly describes the benefits of working with permission after completing a city-commissioned sculpture: "Reid said it would have been impossible to install all three pieces illegally."[he said] "I can do so much more with permission, I can go bigger, for one, and the possibility of getting a budget is also there."

== Video ==
- How to Become Invisible video
- Overpass Graffiti channel 19 News
- The Nonce video

== Selected bibliography ==
- Zipco, Ed (2008). The Adventures of Darius and Downey: And Other True Tales of Street Art, As Told to Ed Zipco. Thames & Hudson. ISBN 0-500-51395-3.
- C100 (2006). The Art of Rebellion 2: World of Urban Activism. Publikat. ISBN 3-9809909-4-X.
- Burns, Kelly (2005). New York Street Art. Die Gestalten Verlag GmbH&Co.KG. ISBN 3-89955-083-8
- Vartanian, Ivan; Martin, Leslie A. (2003). Graphiscape New York City. Rotovision SA. ISBN 2-88046-767-5.

== See also ==
- List of people from Brooklyn
- List of people from Cincinnati
- List of street artists
