= Brad Downey =

American artist, political activist and filmmaker

- Born: 1980 (age 45–46)
- Education: Pratt Institute, The Slade School of Fine Art
- Known for: Site-Specific Installation, Sculpture, Drawing, Architecture
- Movement: Slapstick Formalism, Spontaneous Sculptures, Conceptual art
- Website: braddowney.com

Brad Downey (born 1980 in Louisville, Kentucky) is an American artist and filmmaker. Downey lives in Berlin.

== Education ==
Downey earned a fine art master's degree in painting and sculpture from the Slade School of Art, where he studied under Bruce McLean. He grew up in a United States Marine Corps family. Pratt Institute drew him to New York City in 1998, where he earned a Bachelor of Fine Arts in Documentary Filmmaking.

== Work ==
Through varied work and media, and persistent changes in direction, Brad Downey has avoided one signature visual style. Downey initially became known for transforming public signage into artworks, which he, at first anonymously, installed in public space disguised as a construction worker. His earliest motifs were sculptures of anthropomorphized street furniture dissociating from their intended function. These early works were often made in collaboration with Leon Reid IV. The ephemeral nature of this early series can still be found in many of his works today.

With collaborators Quenell Jones and Tim Hansberry, Downey directed Public Discourse (2003), a 38-minute documentary about graffiti and street art, which screened at numerous locations including the Institute of Contemporary Arts in London, Copenhagen International Documentary Festival and Transmediale in Berlin. The film shows work by artists such as Swoon, Shepard Fairey, Revs, Nato, Desa, Ellen Harvey, JJ Veronis, and Johnny Swing from the Rivington School, and features original music by Japanther. Public Discourse was distributed by Video Data Bank.

In 2007 Downey was awarded SEEDA Arts Plus award for a commission with the Tour de France. Though he completed his installation, the artwork was removed and dismantled by Kent Highway Services before its unveiling because of its potential to confuse pedestrians.

In 2008, Downey sprayed green paint on the shopping windows of Berlins historical KaDeWe mall, which the owners reported to the police as an act of vandalism. However, Downey had been contracted by the Lacoste clothing brand (along with 11 other artists) for an exhibition at KaDeWe celebrating the 75th anniversary of the brand, and he maintained that he was just fulfilling his contract. Die Tageszeitung speculated that the incident might have been a media stunt by Lacoste. These speculations are contradicted by the fact that after the action Lacoste kicked Brad out of the exhibition, deleted him from the press material, and never paid him, what Jan Josweg from Die Tageszeitung described as "The fact is KaDeWe and Lacoste, with their bureaucratic Inflexibility, cannot distinguish art from vandalism both KaDeWe and Lacoste stand there like the cleaning lady at the Düsseldorf Art Academy, who polished off Joseph Beuys Fettecke in 1988" .

In 2009, Downey was commissioned to paint a mural for the Leuphana University of Lüneburg. His mural generated controversy because it looked exactly like an advertisement for the fast food burger chain McDonald's. Brad Downey's "I'm Lovin It" mural was not intended to be a McDonald's advertisement, it was created ironically and was anticipated to serve as a critique to the change of university policy. At the time of the murals creation the university was undergoing a rebranding process. The advertising agency Scholz & Friends had just invented the new name "Leuphana" and developed a new "brand" logo. As part of this rebranding, Leuphana had started the construction of the lecture hall Zentralgebäude by architect Daniel Libeskind. The costs are said to add up to a 109.3 million euro. In order to avoid a public bid invitation for the building contract, Libeskind was made part-time professor at the Leuphana, though he did very few lectures for the students. Daniela Kummle, one of the university students wrote in support of Brad's mural; "An artwork that could in other context be read as a plain provocation acquires a deeper social and political meaning within the recent history of this specific university. It imbibes the earlier articulated fears of critics, that foresee Leuphana becoming a private university serving primarily economic interests. By raising disturbance and maybe even irritation, it functions well as a means of re-initiating the current discourse amongst the students. It will now take time to see, whether the Leuphana will incorporate its own institutional critique by allowing the work to be a permanent installation." The university installed a plaque explaining the meaning of the mural, after a few years the plaque and mural were quietly removed.

In 2019, Downey orchestrated the creation of the first public sculpture of Melania Trump, the wife of the 45th American president Donald Trump, in her home country, Slovenia. The sculpture, which was actually designed and created by a local artisanal artist with a chainsaw, was received with mixed reactions, due in part to Downey having done no physical work on it. The statue stands in Rožno near Trump's home town of Sevnica. The sculpture is reported to have been set on fire near her hometown in Slovenia, prompting its removal. In relation to the destruction of the piece. Downey replaced the statue with a bronze cast of the original in July, 2020. At its unveiling, Mr Downey said the new version had been designed to be "as solid as possible, out of a durable material which cannot be wantonly destroyed". In July 2026, thieves chopped it off at the ankles.

He has exhibited in venues such as the Museum Tinguely Tate Modern, the ICA in London, and Mass MOCA in the US, Peacock Visual Arts, in Scotland, Kunsthalle Dominikanerkirche in Osnabrück, Kunstcentret Silkeborg Bad, in Denmark.

== Bibliography ==
- Zipco, Ed, "The Adventures of Darius and Downey", Thames&Hudson (2008) ISBN 0-500-51395-3
- Downey, Brad, "Spontaneous Sculptures", Gestalten (2011) ISBN 9783899553796
- Downey, Brad, "L'Uso Di Libri – The Use of Books", Possible Books (2016) ISBN 9783944591766
- Downey, Brad, "Slapstick Formalism, Process, Project, Object", Possible Books and Dokument Press (2018) ISBN 9789188369178
- Downey, Brad, "Slapstick Formalism, Process, Project, Object", Hatje Cantz (2020) ISBN 9783775747738
