= Rožno =

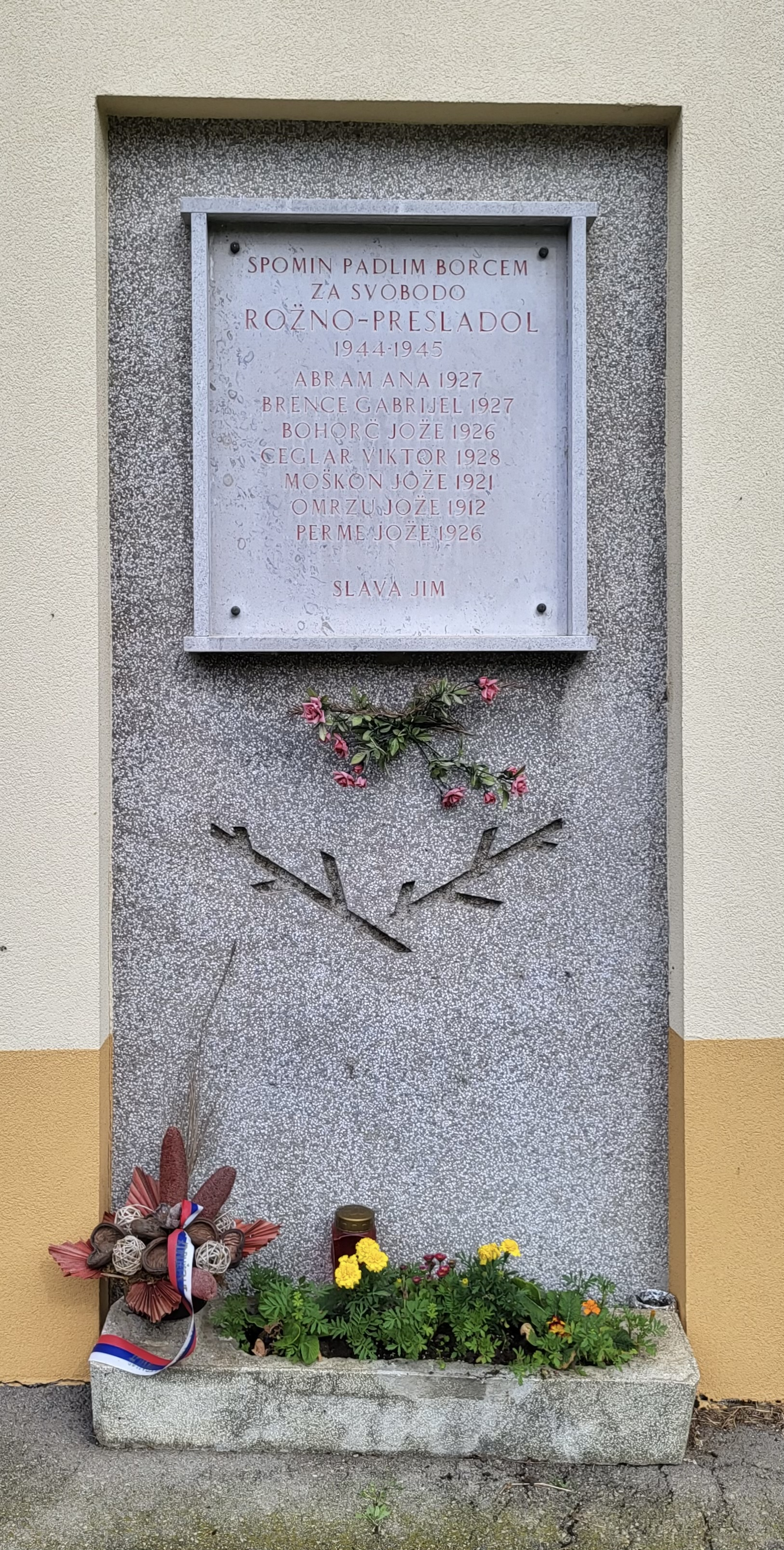

- Location in Slovenia
- Coordinates: 45°59′34.03″N 15°25′53.56″E
- Country: Slovenia
- Traditional region: Styria
- Statistical region: Lower Sava
- Municipality: Krško

Area
  - Total: 3.92 km^{2} (1.51 sq mi)
- Elevation: 168.3 m (552 ft)

Population (2002)
  - Total: 224
- Postal code: 8280

Rožno (pronounced [ˈɾoːʒnɔ], German: Roschno) is a dispersed settlement on the left bank of the Sava River west of Brestanica in the Municipality of Krško in eastern Slovenia. The area is part of the traditional region of Styria. It is now included in the Lower Sava Statistical Region.

== Geography ==
Rožno is a clustered village in a low hilly area on the Sava River. The terrain is characterized by several fluvial terraces, and the settlement includes the hamlets of Brezje, Dobrova, Hruševje (or Hrušovje), Lokve, (Na) Peči (or Pečje), Na Pesku, Petelinjek (or Petelink), Škocjan, Stagonce, Velki Vrh, and Za Savo. Škocjan is the only hamlet near the river and railroad, and it is named after the local church. There is a large field area on a terrace above the Sava and smaller fields on gentle slopes near the houses, and well as a few in the valleys. There are also some vineyards in the village, and much of the land is covered by deciduous woods. The territory of the settlement is cut by Škocjan Creek (Škocjanski potok), Presladol Creek (Presladolski potok), and Štumberk Creek, all tributaries of the Sava. The highest elevation is at Big Hill (Veliki hrib; 283 meters or 928 feet) in the northeast part of the settlement.

== History ==
Stone tools found at the Ob Savi archaeological site indicate that the Rožno area was inhabited in the Chalcolithic period. An Iron Age tumulus in the Radi Woods (Radijeva hosta) has been partially excavated, and there are two well-preserved tumluli southeast of the Abram farm in the village. Additional tumuli are located near the village church, where a Roman-era villa stood on a terrace.

The area was annexed by Nazi Germany during the Second World War and administered as part of Reichsgau Steiermark, and there were plans to rename the village Rosenau, although that name had no etymological or historical basis. A courier connection was maintained in the village by the Partisans during the war. A plaque was installed in the village in 1974 commemorating locals from Rožno and Presladol killed in the war while fighting for the Partisans.

== Church ==
The local church is dedicated to Saint Cantius (Slovene: sveti Kancijan). It belongs to the Parish of Brestanica and dates to the 17th century. The church and its adjoining cemetery are located in the hamlet of Škocjan. The structure has an elongated rectangular chancel walled on three sides, and the bell tower stands to the west of the rectangular nave. The main altar in the church dates to the first half of the 18th century.

== Trivia ==
The first sculpture of Melania Trump, the wife of the 45th American president Donald Trump, publicly unveiled in her home country, Slovenia, stands in Rožno. The sculpture, created in March 2019 by a local artisan with a chainsaw under the guidance of the American artist Brad Downey, was received with mixed reactions, many people calling it grotesque and others wondering whether it was a parody.
