= Underground art =

Art with a following independent of commercial success

Underground art is any form of art that operates outside of conventional norms in the art world, part of underground culture. This can include essentially any genre of art that is not popular in the art world, including visionary art and street art. Underground art can include art created both legally and illegally, organized or unauthorized, and can essentially exist in any form.

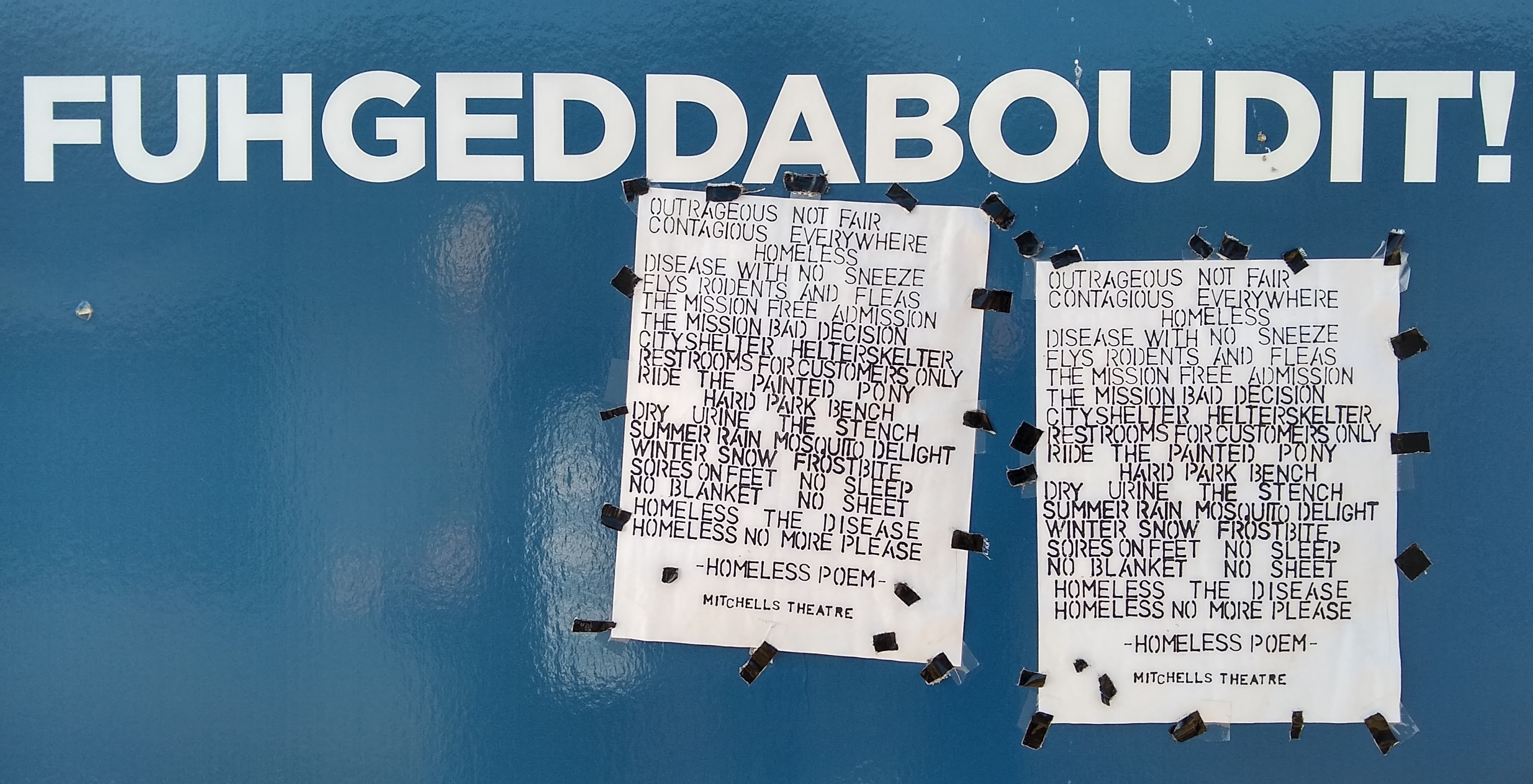
A homeless poem found on a transit advertising display on the Long Island Rail Road.

Visionary art is often considered a form of underground art because of it popularity outside conventional art channels. Rather than being displayed in galleries and museums, most visionary art is displayed online, at music festivals, or other forms of gatherings such as Burning Man and Rainbow Gatherings.

Street art is also often considered a form of underground art because of its unconventional settings. Again, rather than galleries and museums, street art exists in outdoors spaces, utilizing stickers, Lock On sculptures, installations, stencils, and/or spray paint as its medium.

Graffiti is usually an illegal form of street art. Public response to graffiti is not always favorable and is often negative.

It is understood, that these acts mostly happen on public property.

== See also ==
- Underground film
- Underground music
- Underground press
