= Paige Smith (artist) =

American visual artist

- Born: Grand Rapids, Michigan
- Other names: A Common Name
- Education: Texas Tech University, Lubbock, Texas
- Known for: Installation, sculpture, graphic design
- Movement: Installation art, Street installation
- Website: www.acommonname.com

Paige Smith, known professionally as "A Common Name", is an American visual artist, graphic and product designer living in Los Angeles. Smith has been critically regarded for her commercial installations and international street art project, "Urban Geode".

== Background ==
Smith grew up in Texas and earned her BFA in Design Communications at Texas Tech University. After graduation, she moved to San Francisco and worked in graphic design, building marketing materials and branding strategies for corporate clients.

== Street art and "Urban Geode" ==
Smith is best known for creating "Urban Geode," a series of geode-like sculptures made of paper or resin, which she installs in urban settings. The project began in 2011 when Smith came across a photograph of an amethyst that she was inspired to recreate out of paper. Noting the increasing prevalence of murals on the streets of Los Angeles, Smith was moved to put her artwork on the streets as well. For her first piece, Smith found a building with a chipped brick within her community of the Historical Arts District. She realized the shape of the missing brick was the perfect fit for her geode sculpture and created a customized mold to fit inside.

One unusual aspect of "Urban Geode" is it is often found in unconventional locations. Harriet Williams of The Huffingpost Post UK reports: "Paige Smith’s Urban Geode project fills up the cracks and decayed spaces of Los Angeles...". Since first installation in Los Angeles, Smith has refined her "Urban Geode" project and put up installations in various urban settings around the world, including locations in Spain, Bali, Turkey, Dubai and the United States.

Smith's work has received critical support and has been featured in print art books, online forums and traditional press sources including: LA Canvas, Angeleno magazine, The Huffington Post, and the Los Angeles Times.

== Commercial installations ==
As a fine artist, Smith has translated her geode designs to fit larger corporate and gallery spaces. Smith has been commissioned to create several site-specific installations, including:

- The Box Geode at the Los Angeles Standard Hotel (2012)
- Creeping Portend at CBRE's downtown Los Angeles offices (2014)
- Deranged Amalgamation at Maker City L.A. (2014)
- Minute Infinite at Smashbox Studios (2015)

Additionally, she has been featured in several group exhibitions, showing work alongside famed street artists Gregory Siff, CYRCLE, Dave Kinsey and Retna.

Smith's work was installed as the backdrop for a Keds (shoes) global rebrand ad campaign featuring Taylor Swift and promoting female empowerment in the arts.

== Artist in residence ==
=== HAHA Magazine x Paradigm Gallery ===
Smith has expanded her practice to focus more on travel and collaboration. She was asked to be the first artist in residence at HAHA Magazine x Paradigm Gallery in Philadelphia where she created a citywide scavenger hunt of her geodes and taught classes to engage in a dialogue about the benefits of public art.

=== Dubai Design Week: S*uce ===
In October 2015, Smith collaborated with S*uce, a local fashion and lifestyle brand, to create a trail of THINGS [EXTRA]ORDINARY around Dubai's design district. This urban installation elevated everyday objects, from a rocking chair to a water shed, through the placement of Smith's geodes to create re-imagined landscapes.
