= Rice glue =

Gel or liquid adhesive

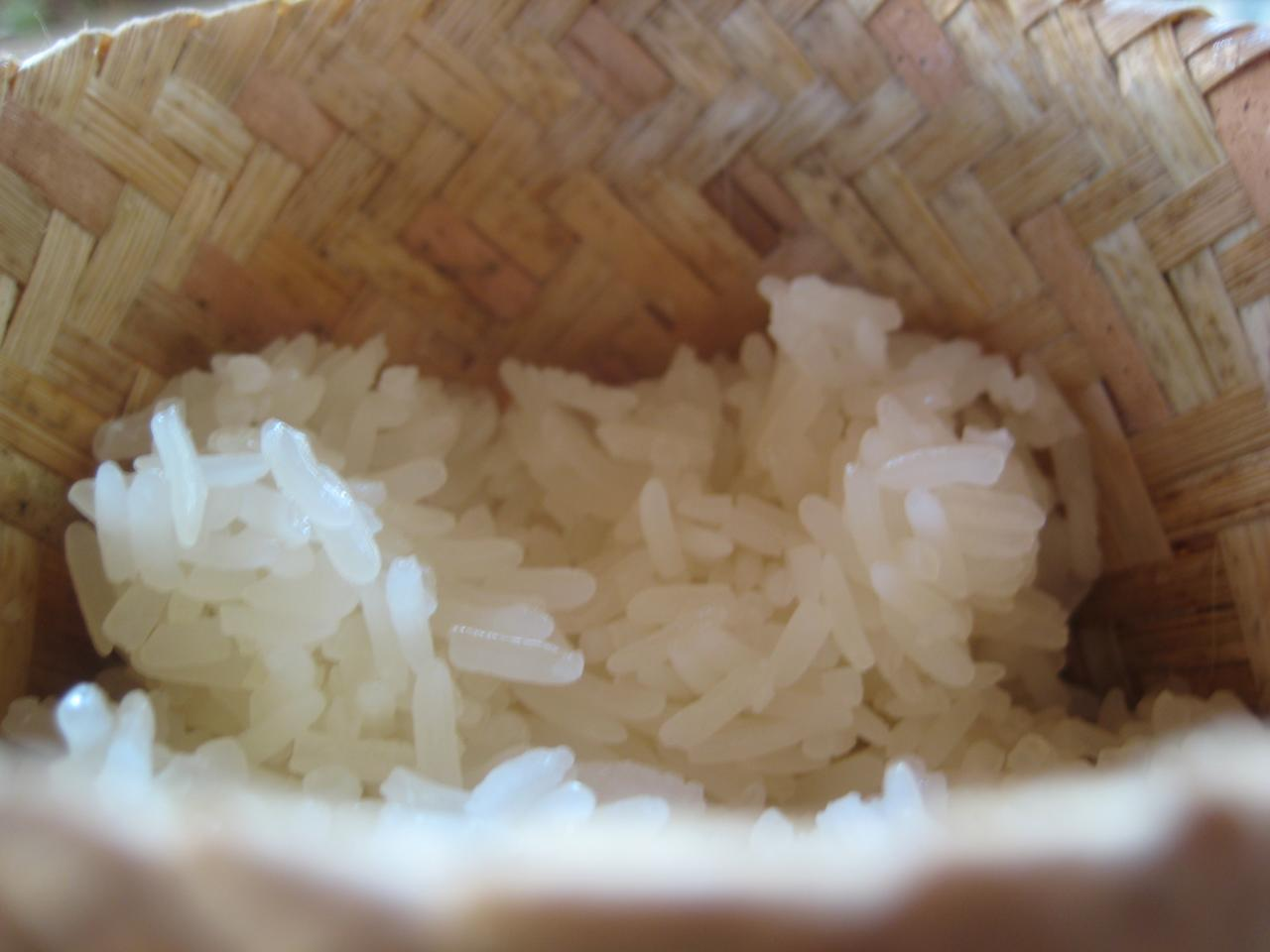
Rice glue can be made from cooked sticky rice (or sometimes regular white rice) and water.

Rice glue (Japanese: 続飯, romanized: sokui) is a gel or liquid adhesive made of a smooth mush of well-cooked white rice, diluted to the desired thickness with water. It has been used since antiquity for various arts and crafts; for instance, it is a woodworking and paper glue. When dried, it is transparent. Rice glue is notable for containing no acids which can degrade the materials it holds together.

It is still used in modern times to reversibly assemble joints; after it has dried, the glue can be soaked, steamed, or split to re-open the joint; on a small wood joint, the glue is resistant to tens of minutes of water immersion.

It is sometimes mixed 1:1 with urushi lacquer to make nori-urushi (Japanese term), which is darker and dries faster than undiluted lacquer, and is used in making lacquerware.

Rice glue is frequently used in Japan and in China.

== See also ==
- Animal glue
- Sticky rice mortar
- Wheatpaste
