= Street installation =

Form of street art and installation art

Street installations are a form of street art and installation art. While conventional street art is done on walls and surfaces street installations use three-dimensional objects set in an urban environment. Like graffiti, it is generally non-permission based and the installation is effectively abandoned by the artist upon completion. Street Installations sometimes have an interactive component, depending on their surroundings or on passersby to complete them, such as plastic-bag animals taped to subway grates that inflate when a passing train pushes air up through the grate.

== Notable works ==
=== Figure installations ===
Isaac Cordal places small cement figures in urban corners as part of his ongoing series Cement Eclipses. In Berlin in 2011, as part of the installation Follow the Leaders, he arranged suited miniature figures in a street puddle; the scene, which Cordal titled Electoral Campaign, was widely circulated online under the informal name "Politicians discussing global warming".

Slinkachu began placing painted miniature figures in London streets in 2006 as the Little People project, photographing the scenes and leaving the figures to be found or overlooked. Photographs of the London works were collected in the 2008 book Little People in the City.

=== Street furniture interventions ===
Leon Reid IV began as a graffiti writer under the name VERBS and went on to paint street signs and install them in daylight while disguised as a construction worker; the Queensborough Community College art gallery describes him as "one of the few artists responsible for introducing sculpture into the language of street-art". From about 2000 he collaborated with Brad Downey as Darius and Downey; dressed as city workers, the pair swapped messages on street signs and bent poles, including into forms that appeared to kiss. Their partnership and installations in New York, London and elsewhere are documented in the 2008 Thames & Hudson book The Adventures of Darius and Downey: and other true tales of street art, as told to Ed Zipco.

Among Reid's titled works, The Kiss (London, 2004) bent street furniture into a kissing pair and was removed by city officials after about an hour; with Downey in the same year he installed Sit Your Arse Down in London. In 2005 in Carroll Gardens, Brooklyn, he bolted a bent telephone sign onto a phone booth and a crinkled one-way sign onto a nearby pole so that the two curved toward each other, a piece he has also referred to as It's All Right and which was reported in The New York Times. In São Paulo in 2007 he installed Love Is a Two-Way Street, a pair of Brazilian one-way signs arranged as if addressing each other, and in Brooklyn in 2011 Pedestrian Shuffle. Downey continued related ephemeral interventions that alter street furniture and other everyday urban materials after the Darius and Downey period; that later body of work is collected in the 2011 Gestalten monograph Spontaneous Sculptures.

The Queens-born twins Ad Deville and Droo, working as Skewville, began their "Sneaker Mission" in 1999: they cut flat sneaker shapes from plywood, screen-print them, tie pairs together and throw them over telephone wires, and they estimate they have hung several thousand in dozens of cities around the world.

The Madrid artist SpY made his own traffic signs and installed them on empty sign posts around Madrid; in April 2005 20 minutos reported that two of them, on Calle de Augusto Figueroa and Calle de Alcalá, disappeared within twelve hours of the paper publishing photographs of them, while others remained, including a danger sign facing the ruins of the Windsor Tower that warned of buildings on fire.

In 2006 the Graffiti Research Lab introduced "LED throwies", an LED, a coin battery and a magnet taped together and thrown in quantity onto metal surfaces such as buildings and street lights, where they stayed lit for days.

In 2008 Joshua Allen Harris taped animals made of plastic bags to subway grates in New York, which inflated and came to life when a passing train pushed air up through the grate.

Yarn bombing, which covers street objects in knitted or crocheted yarn, reached one of its best-known examples on Christmas 2010, when Olek covered the Charging Bull statue near Wall Street in a crocheted sweater without permission; it was removed within about two hours.

The Italian artist Teo Pirisi, known as Moneyless, made geometric installations of cotton thread and string suspended in streets and abandoned places, including in Strasbourg in 2011.

Banksy placed a crumpled red telephone box with a pickaxe in its side, apparently bleeding, in a street in Soho, central London, in April 2006; it was removed by Westminster Council. He has also made stencilled wall pieces that interact with objects already in the street: in March 2024 on Hornsey Road in Finsbury Park, London, he sprayed green paint on a wall behind a heavily pruned cherry tree, beside a stencilled figure holding a pressure washer, so that from a distance the paint appeared to be the tree's foliage.

Ernest Zacharevic took the same approach with Children on a Bicycle (also known as Kids on Bicycle), a mural commissioned for the 2012 George Town Festival in George Town, Malaysia, in which two painted children ride a real bicycle attached to the wall.

From the late 1990s the French artist Zevs made his Electric Shadows in Paris, tracing on the ground in phosphorescent paint the shadows cast by street furniture such as street lamps, traffic lights and mailboxes.

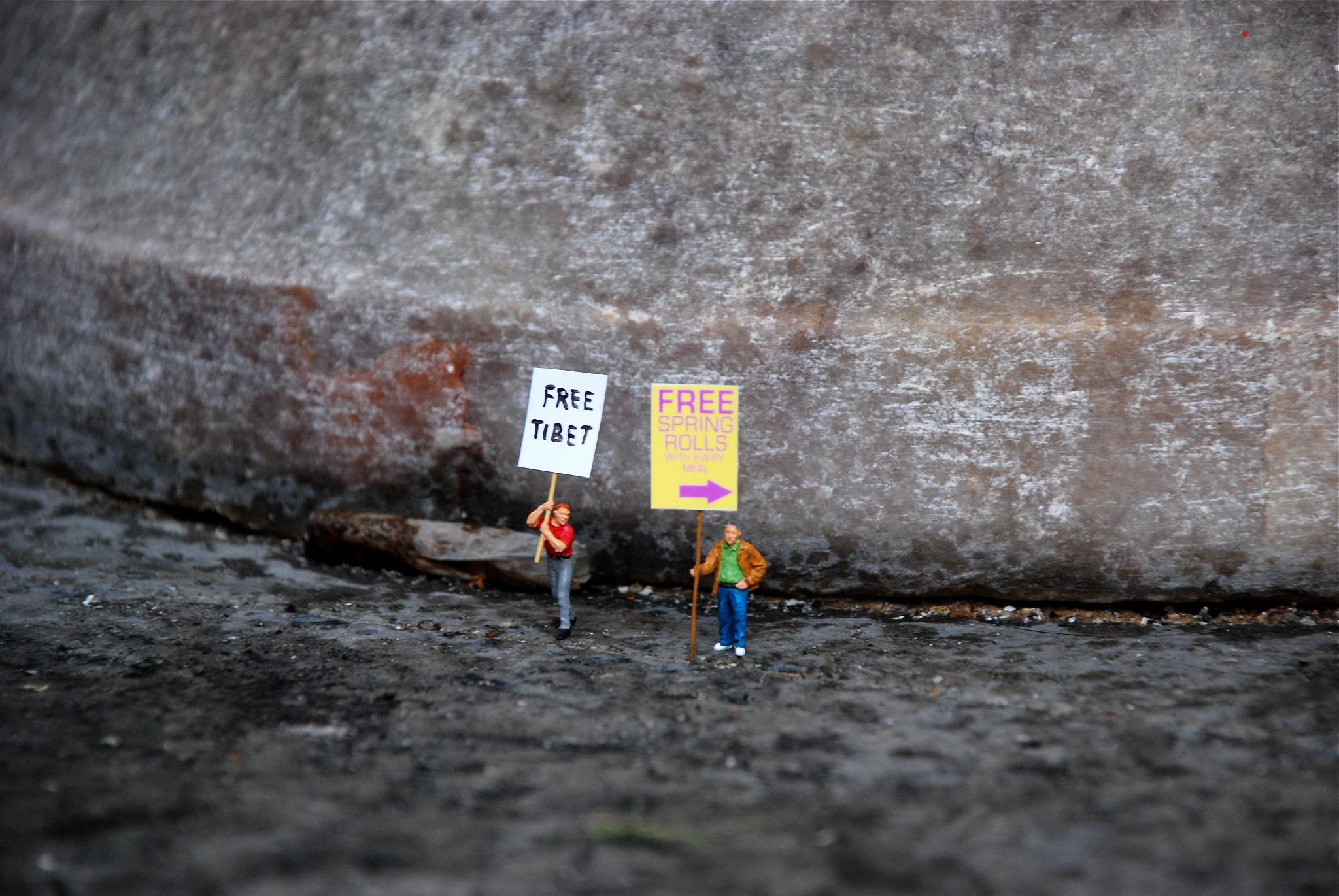
A Little People piece by Slinkachu

The Kiss by Leon Reid IV, London, 2004

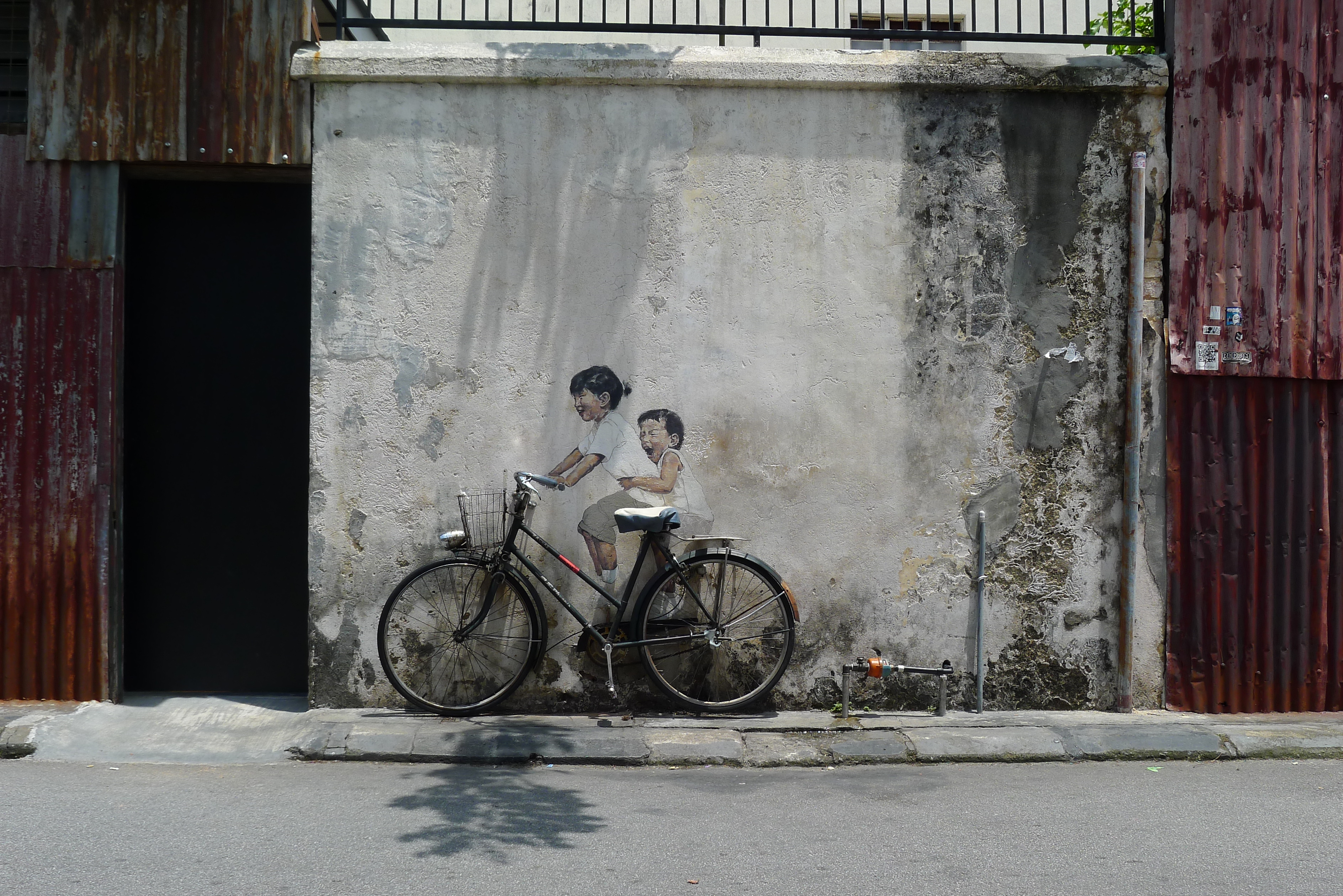
Children on a Bicycle by Ernest Zacharevic, George Town, Penang

== Artists ==
Notable artist in the field include:

- Above
- BIBI
- Banksy
- Bleeps.gr
- Brad Downey
- El Celso
- Ernest Zacharevic
- Graffiti Research Lab
- Harmen de Hoop
- Invader (artist)
- Isaac Cordal
- Manfred Kielnhofer
- Lennie Lee
- Leon Reid IV
- Lionel (artist)
- Mark Divo
- Mark Jenkins
- Max Zorn
- Joe Mangrum
- Mark McGowan
- Nsumi
- Olek
- Paige Smith (A Common Name)
- Slinkachu
- TEJN
- Dan Witz
- Zevs

== See also ==
- Art intervention
- Culture jamming
- Installation art
- Lock On street sculptures
