= Slinkachu =

British street artist

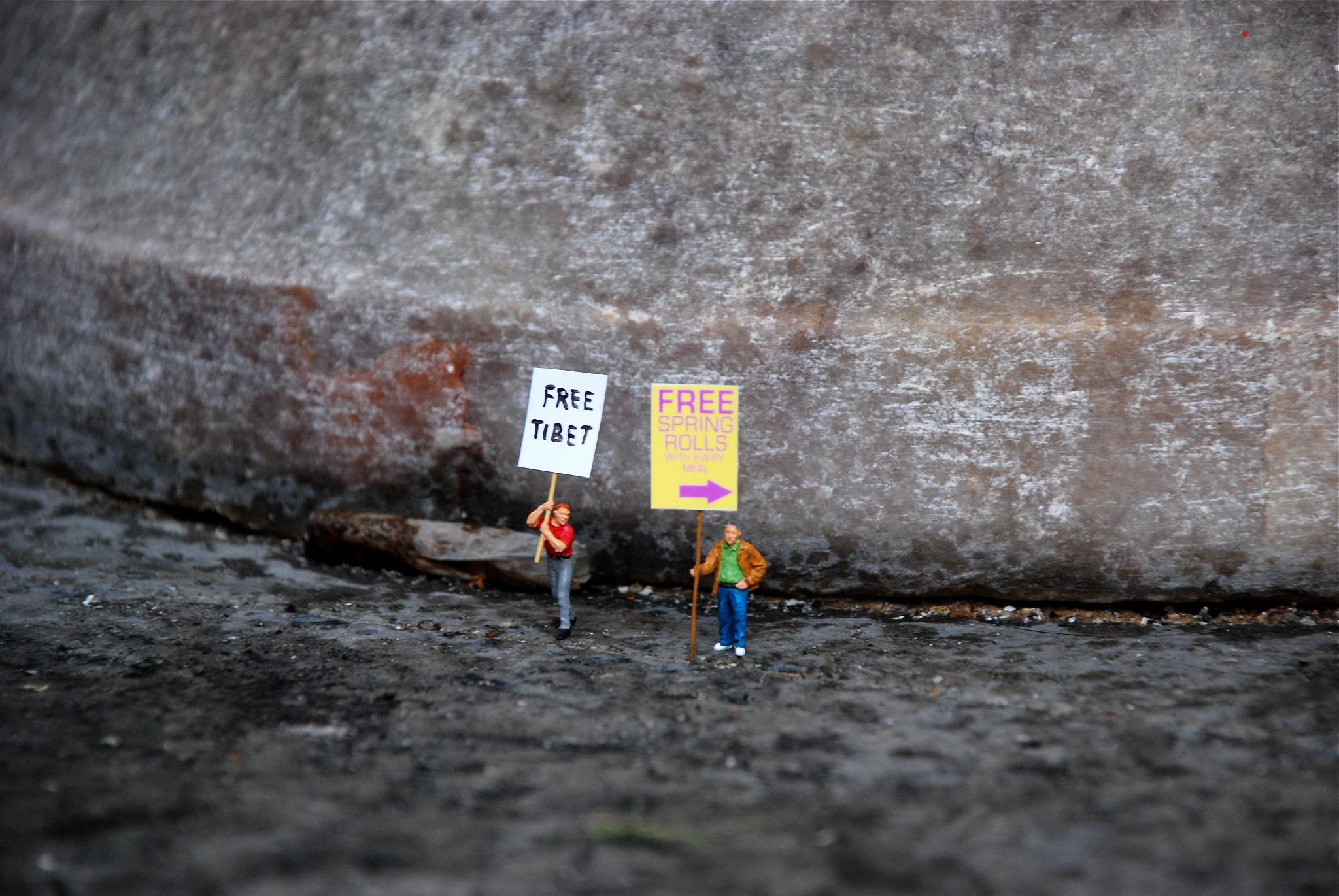

Stuart Pantoll, better known as Slinkachu, is a British street artist whose artwork is a mixture of sculpture, installation, street art and photography.

He was born in 1979 and grew up in Devon and has lived in London since 2003. He trained in advertising while maintaining an interest in making miniature figures as a hobby. He subsequently left his job in advertising to become a full-time artist.

== Work ==
His work is based on remodelling and repainting tiny model people, whose minuscule size creates humorous and thought-provoking scenarios, which he installs in public spaces for visitors and passers-by to discover. He has left his miniature figures in many cities around the world, including Amsterdam, Antwerpen, Barcelona, and Manchester.

The key to Slinkachu's work is its ephemeral nature. His miniature figurines may stay around for days, or even weeks, before they are finally removed, not before he has documented them through large-scale photographs, some of which have appeared in his several books.

As well as exhibiting his work in public spaces, Slinkachu has shown his installations at many galleries, including the Cosh Gallery, London, UK, Museum of Fine Arts Gent - Ghent, Belgium, and the Morlan Gallery, Transylvania University, USA, and the Galerie Joseph, Paris

Regarding the inspiration behind his work, Slinkachu said, “I've always been interested in small things. My dad made me a train set when I was younger but I was never really interested in the trains, it was always the figures, houses and trees that fascinated me.”
