= Revs (graffiti artist) =

American artist

Some of Revs’s artwork

Revs is a New York City graffiti artist whose wheat paste stickers, roller pieces, murals, sculptures, and spray-painted diary entries earned him the reputation of an artist-provocateur over the course of two decades. "Revs" is his tag name; his real name is unknown. Before adopting the tag name "Revs" he had used the tag name "Revlon". in a 1993 New York Times interview he said he decided to shorten it to "Revs" following an epiphany he experienced after contemplating suicide on the Manhattan Bridge.

== Work With Adam Cost ==
Revs began tagging in the 1980s, but his graffiti tagline gained notoriety when he began working with another graffiti writer, Adam Cost, of Queens, in 1993. The two covered Manhattan with wheat paste stickers, which they posted on the back of hundreds of pedestrian crossing signals. On these stickers, which were essentially 8 ½ by 11 white pieces of paper, adhered with wheat paste, the two printed cryptic messages in bold, black letters: "Lousy Kid Revs," "Cost Fucked Madonna," "Zookeeper Revs."

The two were notorious for painting their tags in sprawling block letters on the broadsides of buildings or any other surface deemed optimal. The scope of these works was often large: a finished COST REVS tag, done in white or yellow paint, often stretched an average of 15 feet in length and 6 in height. The act required a paint roller, the kind usually used for painting houses, and one full bucket of paint. Revs and Cost performed these paint-roller tags in conspicuous places — a billboard at a cross section in Manhattan was fair game, as was a wall on a roof facing a busy thoroughfare — places where the two could have easily been caught or injured.

As Revs told Glenn O'Brien for Artforum magazine in a 1994 interview:

"We think art should be dangerous. Everybody's into safe art, doing safe things in their studio. We're bringing danger back into it. It's got to be on the edge, where it's not allowed."

Revs refuses to sell his work. He told a New York Times reporter, "once money changes hands for art, it becomes a fraudulent activity."

Revs also released a vinyl record album in 1993, entitled, "REVS - JUST STAY AWAY".

Following a brief hiatus in 1995 — which probably resulted from Cost being arrested a few months earlier — Revs explored subway tunnels, and spraypainted diary entries, personal histories and ruminations on the walls, usually deep within the tunnels. He said this was a "personal mission" and "didn't care if anyone ever saw it."

In 2000 Revs was arrested after an extensive investigation by the NYPD Vandal Squad of much of the work bearing his name in the subways. He did no more work between 2000-2004. In 2002, steel sculptures began to pop up around Brooklyn and Lower Manhattan, which were created with construction-grade steel and spelled out the name Revs.

A metal Revs sculpture in Brooklyn.

Contacted for comment, again by the New York Times, Revs told reporter Randy Kennedy he had, for the most part, received property owners' permission to weld and bolt these sculptures to the outsides of buildings.

"A car can back up into [the sculpture]," he said. "Somebody can get their head cracked open on it. A dog can go on it. Somebody can paint it if they want. It rusts. It's more interesting that way, you know?"

The story of Revs' diaries and his arrest were featured in the Public Radio International show, This American Life.

== See also ==
- Banksy, prolific English graffiti artist whose name is also unknown
- Invader, anonymous French street artist has made a sculpture of Revs and Cost during a show in 2011
- Shepard Fairey, street artist known for his Obey Giant campaign
- Stephen Powers (artist), street artist who often collaborated with Revs as ESPO
