= Wheatpaste =

Liquid adhesive made from vegetable starch and water

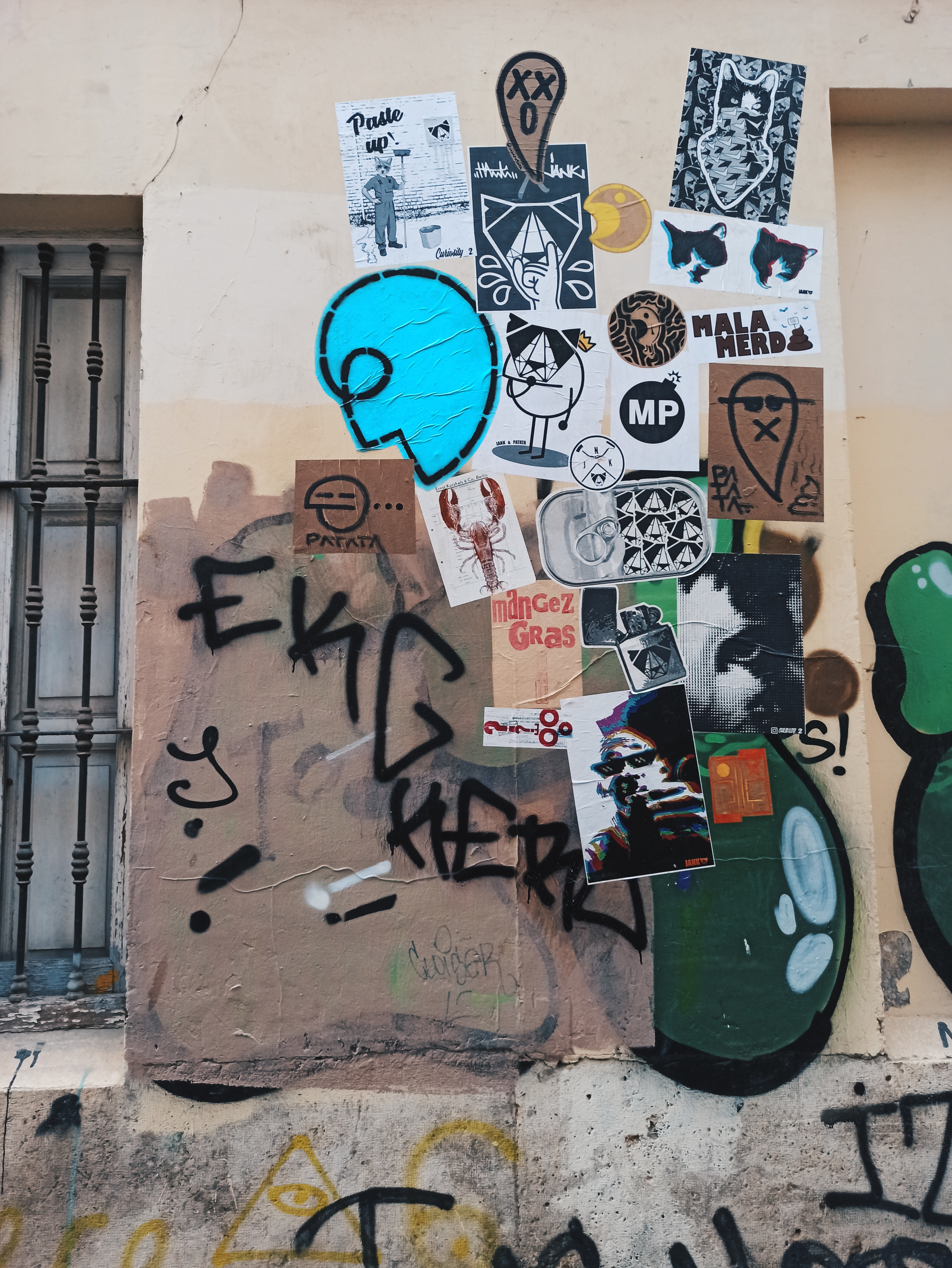
Poster combo in streets of El Barrio del Carmen in Valencia, Spain

Wheatpaste (also known as flour and water paste, flour paste, or simply paste) is a gel or liquid adhesive made from wheat flour or starch and water. It has been used since antiquity for various arts and crafts such as bookbinding, découpage, collage, papier-mâché, and adhering paper posters and notices to walls.

== Types ==
A critical difference among wheat pastes is the division between those made from flour and those made from starch. Vegetable flours contain both gluten and starch. Over time the gluten in a flour paste cross-links, making it very difficult to release the adhesive. Using only starch, a fine quality, fully reversible paste can be produced. The latter is used as an adhesive for paper and book conservation.

Besides wheat, other vegetables also are processed into flours and starches from which pastes can be made, such as potato starch: characteristics, such as strength, texture, or reversibility, vary with the plant species; manufacturer's processing; and/or the recipe of the end-user.

== Uses ==
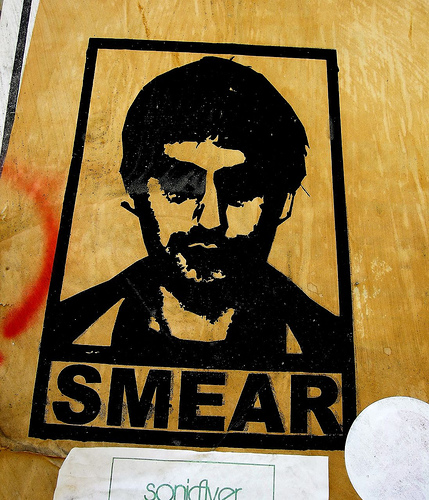
A poster adhered by wheat paste

A common use is to make chains of paper rings, often from colored construction paper. It can also be used to create papier-mâché. In the fine arts, wheat starch paste is often used in preparation and presentation. A good wheat starch paste has a strength compatible with many paper artifacts, remains reversible over time, is neither too acidic or alkaline, and is white.

Activists and various subculture proponents often use this adhesive to flypost propaganda and artwork. It has also commonly been used by commercial bill posters since the nineteenth century. In particular, it was widely used by nineteenth and twentieth century circus bill posters, who developed a substantial culture around paste manufacture and postering campaigns. In the field of alcohol and nightclub advertising, in the 1890s, Henri de Toulouse-Lautrec's posters were so popular that instructions were published on how to peel down the pasted posters without damage.

Until the 1970s, commercial poster hangers always "cooked" their own paste, but since then many have bought pre-cooked instant pastes. It is applied to the backside of paper then placed on flat surfaces, particularly concrete and metal as it does not adhere well to wood or plastic. Cheap, rough paper such as newsprint, works well, as it can be briefly dipped in the mixture to saturate the fibres.

When hanging unauthorized billboards or signage, to reduce the danger of being caught, wheatpasters frequently work in teams or affinity groups. In the United States and Canada, this process is typically called "wheatpasting" or "poster bombing", even when using commercial wallpaper paste instead of traditional wheat paste. In the United Kingdom, commercial wheatpasting is called flyposting and wheatpasting associated with urban art is called paste up.

== See also ==
- Animal glue – Adhesive created from boiling animal connective tissue
- Polyvinyl acetate – Adhesive used for porous materials
- Rice glue – Gel or liquid adhesive
- Flyposting – Marketing tactic
- Street poster art – Kind of graffiti
- Sticker art – Type of street art
