= North Somerset Council elections =

Local government elections in Somerset, England

North Somerset Council is the local authority for the unitary authority of North Somerset, England. Until 1 April 1996 it was a non-metropolitan district called Woodspring, in the county of Avon.

== Election results ==
Composition of the council
Year	Conservative	Liberal Democrats (Note: Includes totals for the predecessors of the Liberal Democrats, the Liberal Party and SDP (both of which participated in the Alliance).)	Labour	Green (Note: Includes totals for the predecessors of the Green Party of England and Wales, the Ecology Party and Green Party UK.)	Independents & Others	Council control after election
Local government reorganisation; council established (61 seats)
1973	41	3	10	–	7	Conservative
1976	50	0	7	0	4	Conservative
New ward boundaries (59 seats)
1979	46	3	5	0	5	Conservative
1980	45	3	6	0	5	Conservative
1982	46	3	5	0	5	Conservative
1983	47	3	4	0	5	Conservative
1984	47	3	4	0	5	Conservative
1986	45	6	4	1	3	Conservative
1987 (Note: Changed from one-third to whole council elections.)	45	5	4	1	4	Conservative
1991	36	14	4	1	4	Conservative
Woodspring becomes a unitary authority, named changed to North Somerset (59 seats)
1995	18	29	6	1	5	No overall control
New ward boundaries (61 seats)
1999	32	11	13	1	4	Conservative
2003	24	23	10	1	3	No overall control
2007	43	8	3	1	6	Conservative
2011	42	6	5	1	7	Conservative
New ward boundaries (50 seats)
2015	36	4	3	1	6	Conservative
2019	13	11	6	3	17 (Note: 13 Independents, 4 Portishead Independents)	No overall control
2023	13	9	10	7	11 (Note: 8 Independents, 3 Portishead Independents)	No overall control

== Council elections ==
=== Non-metropolitan district elections ===
- 1973 Woodspring District Council election
- 1976 Woodspring District Council election
- 1979 Woodspring District Council election (New ward boundaries)
- 1980 Woodspring District Council election
- 1982 Woodspring District Council election
- 1983 Woodspring District Council election (District boundary changes took place but the number of seats remained the same)
- 1984 Woodspring District Council election (District boundary changes took place but the number of seats remained the same)
- 1986 Woodspring District Council election
- 1987 Woodspring District Council election
- 1991 Woodspring District Council election (District boundary changes took place but the number of seats remained the same)
- 1995 Woodspring District Council election

=== Unitary authority elections ===
- 1999 North Somerset Council election (New ward boundaries increased the number of seats by 2)
- 2003 North Somerset Council election
- 2007 North Somerset Council election
- 2011 North Somerset Council election (New ward boundaries)
- 2015 North Somerset Council election (New ward boundaries)
- 2019 North Somerset Council election
- 2023 North Somerset Council election

== District result maps ==
1979 results map

1980 results map

1982 results map

1983 results map

1984 results map

1985 results map

1987 results map

1991 results map

1999 results map

2003 results map

2007 results map

2011 results map

2015 results map

2019 results map

2023 results map

== By-election results ==
=== 1995–1999 ===
Weston-Super-Mare South By-Election 28 November 1996
Party	Candidate	Votes	%	±%
Labour		1,232	58.1	
Liberal Democrats		635	30.0	
Conservative		178	8.4	
Independent		74	3.5	
Majority		597	28.1	
Turnout		2,119	35.8	
Labour hold		Swing		

=== 1999–2003 ===
Kewstoke By-Election 25 January 2001
Party	Candidate	Votes	%	±%
Conservative	Ian Porter	279	32.7	−20.9
Liberal Democrats	Michael Bibb	229	26.8	−3.0
Independent	Anthony Horry	196	23.0	+23.0
Labour	Stephen Lyall	149	17.5	+1.0
Majority		50	5.9	
Turnout		853	36.0	
Conservative hold		Swing		

Weston-Super-Mare West By-Election 30 August 2001
Party	Candidate	Votes	%	±%
Liberal Democrats	Mike Bell	811	44.4	+8.2
Conservative	Clive Webb	651	35.9	−9.0
Independent	Malcolm Timmis	205	11.2	+11.2
Labour	Chris Belton-Reed	161	8.8	−10.7
Majority		160	8.5	
Turnout		1,828	25.4	
Liberal Democrats gain from Conservative		Swing		

Yatton By-Election 25 October 2001
Party	Candidate	Votes	%	±%
Liberal Democrats	Peter Kehoe	593	29.2	−4.7
Conservative	Stanley Vyce	534	26.3	+6.7
Independent	Ralph James	496	24.4	−10.7
Labour	Douglas May	410	20.2	+8.8
Majority		59	2.9	
Turnout		2,033	29.2	
Liberal Democrats hold		Swing		

=== 2003–2007 ===
Easton-In-Gordano By-Election 11 November 2004
Party	Candidate	Votes	%	±%
Conservative	Carl Francis-Pester	431	44.3	−17.1
Liberal Democrats	Wendy Griggs	369	37.9	+15.0
Labour	Derek Waters	174	17.9	+2.2
Majority		62	6.4	
Turnout		974	44.0	
Conservative hold		Swing		

Portishead Redcliffe Bay By-Election 3 February 2005
Party	Candidate	Votes	%	±%
Liberal Democrats	Michael Johnston	476	43.8	+4.0
Conservative	David Pasley	434	39.9	−20.3
UKIP	Anthony Butcher	118	10.8	+10.8
Labour		59	5.4	+5.4
Majority		42	3.9	
Turnout		1,087	45.5	
Liberal Democrats gain from Conservative		Swing		

Portishead West By-Election 1 June 2006
Party	Candidate	Votes	%	±%
Conservative	David Jolley	488	38.9	+20.8
Liberal Democrats	Jean Lord	452	36.1	+36.1
Labour	Patricia Gardener	205	16.4	+16.4
Independent	Reyna Knight	108	8.6	−73.3
Majority		36	2.8	
Turnout		1,253	49.0	
Conservative gain from Independent		Swing		

Yatton By-Election 1 June 2006
Party	Candidate	Votes	%	±%
Liberal Democrats	Wendy Griggs	812	31.1	+1.3
Independent	Anthony Moulin	749	28.7	−5.8
Conservative	Jill Iles	678	26.0	+3.5
Independent	Hilary Burn	267	10.2	+10.2
Labour	Bryan Moore	104	4.0	−9.1
Majority		63	2.4	
Turnout		2,610	38.4	
Liberal Democrats gain from Independent		Swing		

Pill By-Election 7 September 2006
Party	Candidate	Votes	%	±%
Independent	Nanette Kirsen	360	33.9	+33.9
Labour	Pauline Robertson	353	33.2	−28.0
Liberal Democrats	David Neale	202	19.0	+3.4
Conservative	Anne-Marie Gregory	147	13.8	−9.3
Majority		7	0.7	
Turnout		1,062	40.0	
Independent gain from Labour		Swing		

=== 2007–2011 ===
North Worle (3) By-Election 7 June 2007
Party	Candidate	Votes	%	±%
Conservative	Philip Judd	946		
Conservative	Steven Edwards	920		
Conservative	Marcia Pepperall	904		
Liberal Democrats	Ronald Moon	513		
Liberal Democrats	Richard Skinner	498		
Liberal Democrats	Peter Hardaway	494		
Labour	Barbara Francis	268		
Labour	Brian Grace	234		
Labour	Simon Stokes	218		
Independent	Laurence Orme	157		
UKIP	Mary Brown	154		
Turnout		5,306	26.6	
Conservative gain from Liberal Democrats		Swing		
Conservative gain from Liberal Democrats		Swing		
Conservative gain from Liberal Democrats		Swing		

Weston Super Mare Clarence and Uphill By-Election 18 December 2008
Party	Candidate	Votes	%	±%
Conservative	Amratlal Patel	478	27.5	−33.6
Independent	John Ley-Morgan	477	27.5	+27.5
Liberal Democrats	Paula Howell	421	24.3	−4.1
Independent	Sidney Carter	228	13.1	+13.1
Labour	Josephine Bateman	132	7.6	−2.9
Majority		1	0.1	
Turnout		1,736	24.6	
Conservative hold		Swing		

Hutton and Locking By-Election 4 June 2009
Party	Candidate	Votes	%	±%
Conservative	Terence Porter	1,411	64.9	−4.2
Liberal Democrats	Jennifer Bindon	511	23.5	+2.8
Labour	Timothy Taylor	253	11.6	+1.4
Majority		900	41.4	
Turnout		2,175	42.7	
Conservative hold		Swing		

=== 2011–2015 ===
Backwell By-Election 8 September 2011
Party	Candidate	Votes	%	±%
Independent	Geoff Coombs	816	61.7	
Conservative	Peter Burden	314	23.7	
Labour	Terry Connell	124	9.4	
Liberal Democrats	Nick Alderton	69	5.2	
Majority		502	37.9	
Turnout		1,323	28.3	
Independent hold		Swing		

Weston-super-Mare South By-Election 2 May 2013
Party	Candidate	Votes	%	±%
Labour	James Clayton	1,044	55.0	−0.5
UKIP	Louis Rostill	449	23.6	+23.6
Liberal Democrats	Rachel Ling	214	11.3	−3.2
Conservative	John Butler	192	10.1	−12.7
Majority		595	31.3	
Turnout		1,899		
Labour hold		Swing		

Weston-super-Mare North Worle By-Election 25 July 2013
Party	Candidate	Votes	%	±%
Independent	Derek Mead	531	25.5	+25.5
Conservative	Richard Nightingale	471	22.6	−27.5
Labour	Denise Hunt	445	21.4	−1.9
Liberal Democrats	Edward Keating	321	15.4	−11.2
UKIP	Steven Pearse-Danker	220	10.6	+10.6
Independent	Rachel Ling	93	4.5	+4.5
Majority		60	2.9	
Turnout		2,081		
Independent gain from Conservative		Swing		

=== 2015–2019 ===
North Worle By-Election 31 August 2017
Party	Candidate	Votes	%	±%
Labour	Denise Estelle Hunt	589	36.4	
Conservative	James Davies	525	32.4	
Liberal Democrats	Alan Stuart Rice	265	16.4	
Independent	Richard Geoffrey Skinner	132	8.2	
UKIP	Anita Christine Maria Spencer-Johns	108	6.7	
Majority		64	0.4	
Turnout		1,619	25.6	
Labour gain from North Somerset First Independents				

=== 2019–2023 ===
Portishead East: 6 May 2021
Party	Candidate	Votes	%	±%
Portishead Ind.	Caroline Davinia Goddard	768	40.4	−30.6
Conservative	David Harry Collingwood Oyns	609	32.1	+14.7
Liberal Democrats	Paul Anthony Welton	303	16.0	N/A
Labour	Sophie Ann Davies	219	11.5	+3.2
Turnout		1,899	34.15	–1.81
Registered electors		5,701		
Portishead Ind. hold		Swing		

Congresbury & Puxton: 22 July 2021
Party	Candidate	Votes	%	±%
Green	Phil Neve	594	64.5	N/A
Conservative	Samantha Pepperall	270	29.3	+15.7
Labour	Dawn Parry	57	6.2	−25.8
Majority		324	35.2	N/A
Turnout		922	28.6	−10.7
Green gain from Liberal Democrats		Swing	▲24.4	

=== 2023-2027 ===
Wrington: 16 November 2023
Party	Candidate	Votes	%	±%
Green	Thomas Daw	336	32.7	N/A
Conservative	Annabel Tall	297	28.9	+6.8
Liberal Democrats	Samantha Louden-Cooke	283	27.5	N/A
Labour	Steven Lister	112	10.9	N/A
Majority		39	3.8	
Turnout		1,028		
Green gain from Independent				

Long Ashton: 13 November 2025
Party	Candidate	Votes	%	±%
Green	Mike Dunn	1,254	55.6	
Conservative	James Gillham	399	17.7	
Reform	James Read	349	15.5	
Liberal Democrats	Francoise Johnston	129	5.7	
Labour	Ian Ridge	121	5.3	
Majority		855	37.9	
Turnout		2,252		
Green hold				

Clevedon South: 5 February 2026
Party	Candidate	Votes	%	±%
Labour	Michael Harriott	350	29.0	−25.4
Reform	Louise Branson	334	27.7	N/A
Conservative	Harry Blades	224	18.6	−27.0
Green	Dave Skinner	197	16.3	N/A
Liberal Democrats	Jude Chambers	100	8.3	N/A
Majority		16	1.3	
Turnout		1,205		
Labour hold				

Hutton and Locking: 10 September 2026
Party	Candidate	Votes	%	±%
Reform	William Jones	706	38.5	
Liberal Democrats	Georgina Barry	612	33.3	
Conservative	John Standfield	281	15.3	
Labour	Yue He Parkinson	133	7.2	
Green	James Willis-Boden	104	5.7	
Majority		94	5.1	
Turnout		1,836		
Reform gain from Conservative				
