= 2011 North Somerset Council election =

2011 UK local government election

← 2007	5 May 2011	2015 →

All 61 seats to North Somerset Council 31 seats needed for a majority
	First party	Second party	Third party
	Con	Ind	LD
Party	Conservative	Independent	Liberal Democrats
Last election	46 seats, 44.4%	6 seats, 6.9%	5 seats, 29.2%
Seats won	42	7	6
Seat change	▼4	▲1	▼2
Popular vote	58,442	18,071	24,553
Percentage	44.4%	13.7%	18.7%
Swing	▼3.8%	▲6.8%	▼10.5%
	Fourth party	Fifth party
	Lab	Grn
Party	Labour	Green
Last election	5 seats, 20.3%	1 seat, 1.2%
Seats won	5	1
Seat change	▲2	-
Popular vote	26,642	2,620
Percentage	20.3%	1.6%
Swing	▲6.8%	▲0.4%
- Map of the results of the 2011 North Somerset council election. Conservatives in blue, independent in grey, Liberal Democrats in yellow, Labour in red and Green Party in green.
Council control before election
Conservative
Council control after election
Conservative

The 2011 North Somerset Council election took place on 5 May 2011 to elect members of North Somerset Unitary Council in Somerset, England. The whole council was up for election and the Conservative Party stayed in overall control of the council.

== Background ==
At the last election in 2007 the Conservatives gained control of the council with 46 seats. This was compared to 6 independents, 5 Liberal Democrats, 3 Labour and 1 Green Party councillors.

In February 2011 Liberal Democrat councillor for Nailsea East Andy Cole said he would be standing in the election as an independent. Cole was one of a total of 182 candidates who stood in the election for the 61 seats on the council. These were 58 Conservatives, 53 Labour, 42 Liberal Democrats, 20 independents, 5 Green Party, 3 United Kingdom Independence Party and 1 from the All The South Party. The most candidates were in Weston-super-Mare West ward, where 12 people contested the seats.

The Conservative administration of the previous 4 years was attacked over the cost moving the council offices to Castlewood in Clevedon and over the refurbishment of the town hall in Weston-super-Mare. However the Conservatives said they had been able to make savings and therefore not had to make as big cuts as other councils.

== Election result ==
The results saw the Conservatives remain in control of the council after winning 42 of the 61 seats. Independents won 7 seats, the Liberal Democrats 6, Labour 5 and the Green Party 1 seat.

The Liberal Democrats took 2 seats from the Conservatives in Weston-super-Mare Central and 3 seats from them in Weston-super-Mare West, but lost 3 seats back to the Conservatives in Weston-super-Mare South Worle. Meanwhile, Labour also gained 2 seats from the Conservatives in Weston-super-Mare East. Long time councillor and independent Nan Kirsen lost her seat in Pill to another independent Don Davies, standing for the Sustainable Pill and District Party, by 17 votes, while Andy Cole won his seat in Nailsea East as an independent after leaving the Liberal Democrats.

North Somerset local election result 2011
Party	Seats	Gains	Losses	Net gain/loss	Seats %	Votes %	Votes	+/−
Conservative	42	3	7	-4	68.9	44.4	58,442	-3.8%
Independent	7	1	0	+1	11.5	13.7	18,017	+6.8%
Liberal Democrats	6	5	4	+1	9.8	18.7	24,553	-10.5%
Labour	5	2	0	+2	8.2	20.3	26,645	+6.8%
Green	1	0	0	0	1.6	2.0	2,620	+0.4%
UKIP	0	0	0	0	0	0.8	1,109	+0.1%
All The South Party	0	0	0	0	0	0.1	137	+0.1%

== Ward results ==
Backwell (2)
Party	Candidate	Votes	%	±%
Independent	Karen Barclay	1,603	40.2%	
Independent	Thomas Collinson	1,602	40.2%	
Conservative	Peter Burden	778	19.5%	
Turnout		3,983	51.5	+6.4
Independent hold		Swing		
Independent hold		Swing		

Banwell & Winscombe (3)
Party	Candidate	Votes	%	±%
Conservative	Ann Harley	2,055	63.9%	
Conservative	Anthony Lake	1,914	57.3%	
Conservative	Timothy Marter	1,765	54.9%	
Green	Cresten Boase	936	29.4%	
Labour	Stanley Banks	637	19.8%	
Liberal Democrats	David Gilbert	628	19.5%	
Liberal Democrats	Brian Pike	590	18.3%	
Labour	Barry Edwards	554	17.2%	
Labour	Georgina Edwards	549	17.1%	
Turnout		9,628	44.4	+6.6
Conservative hold		Swing		
Conservative hold		Swing		
Conservative hold		Swing		

Blagdon & Churchill
Party	Candidate	Votes	%	±%
Conservative	Elizabeth Wells	1,094	71.0	+5.9
Labour	Mark Burgess	446	29.0	+22.1
Majority		648	42.1	+5.0
Turnout		1,540	50.7	+6.1
Conservative hold		Swing		

Clevedon Central
Party	Candidate	Votes	%	±%
Conservative	Nicholas Pennycott	445	43.2	−1.9
Labour	Stuart Hale	403	39.2	+15.3
Liberal Democrats	Bronno Vanderholt	181	17.6	−13.4
Majority		42	4.1	−10.1
Turnout		1,029	41.8	+8.3
Conservative hold		Swing		

Clevedon East
Party	Candidate	Votes	%	±%
Independent	David Shopland	622	52.2	−8.2
Conservative	Jon Middleton	338	28.4	+3.3
Labour	Nicholas Green	232	19.5	+5.0
Majority		284	23.8	−11.6
Turnout		1,192	45.8	+10.7
Independent hold		Swing		

Clevedon North
Party	Candidate	Votes	%	±%
Conservative	Robert Garner	733	68.5	+23.2
Labour	Joseph Norman	337	31.5	+31.5
Majority		396	37.0	+32.3
Turnout		1,070	50.0	+7.5
Conservative hold		Swing		

Clevedon South
Party	Candidate	Votes	%	±%
Conservative	Linda Knott	499	50.7	+11.7
Labour	Alan Cotton	485	49.3	+13.9
Majority		14	1.4	−2.2
Turnout		984	40.5	+4.9
Conservative hold		Swing		

Clevedon Walton
Party	Candidate	Votes	%	±%
Conservative	John Norton-Sealey	917	65.7	+1.1
Liberal Democrats	Jack Dagnall	245	17.6	−17.8
Labour	Martin Hime	233	16.7	+16.7
Majority		672	48.2	+19.0
Turnout		1,395	60.8	+9.3
Conservative hold		Swing		

Clevedon West
Party	Candidate	Votes	%	±%
Conservative	Christopher Blades	558	46.3	−8.4
Independent	Trevor Morgan	342	28.4	+28.4
Labour	Ivy Cameron	304	25.2	−20.1
Majority		216	17.9	+8.6
Turnout		1,204	49.3	+5.7
Conservative hold		Swing		

Clevedon Yeo
Party	Candidate	Votes	%	±%
Conservative	Colin Hall	550	55.6	−2.5
Labour	Alistair Lindsay	290	29.3	−12.6
Liberal Democrats	Robert Masding	149	15.1	+15.1
Majority		260	26.3	+10.2
Turnout		989	40.2	+9.4
Conservative hold		Swing		

Congresbury
Party	Candidate	Votes	%	±%
Green	Thomas Leimdorfer	825	58.1	−7.2
Conservative	Samantha Pepperall	418	29.4	−2.5
Labour	Anthony Wontner-Smith	121	8.5	+8.5
Liberal Democrats	June How	56	3.9	+3.9
Majority		407	28.7	−4.7
Turnout		1,420	51.7	+5.0
Green hold		Swing		

Easton-in-Gordano
Party	Candidate	Votes	%	±%
Conservative	Carl Francis-Pester	729	61.4	−10.9
Independent	Madeline Bickle	459	38.6	+38.6
Majority		270	22.7	−22.0
Turnout		1,188	54.2	+9.4
Conservative hold		Swing		

Gordano
Party	Candidate	Votes	%	±%
Conservative	Nigel Ashton	1,093	67.8	−8.5
Labour	Terry Lester	276	17.1	+17.1
Liberal Democrats	Daisy Bickley	243	15.1	−8.6
Majority		817	50.7	−2.0
Turnout		1,612	50.0	+3.0
Conservative hold		Swing		

Hutton & Locking (2)
Party	Candidate	Votes	%	±%
Conservative	Terence Porter	1,544	65.9%	
Conservative	Elfan Ap Rees	1,370	58.4%	
Labour	Anthony Probert	495	21.1%	
Liberal Democrats	Glyn Hayes	476	20.3%	
Labour	Timothy Taylor	424	18.1%	
Liberal Democrats	Hamish Macdonald Fraser	375	16.0%	
Turnout		4,684	46.3	+6.8
Conservative hold		Swing		
Conservative hold		Swing		

Kewstoke
Party	Candidate	Votes	%	±%
Conservative	Ian Porter	733	60.5	−2.7
Labour	Susan Popperwell	274	22.6	+13.7
Liberal Democrats	Jeffrey Alen	204	16.8	−11.1
Majority		459	37.9	+2.6
Turnout		1,211	45.9	+8.3
Conservative hold		Swing		

Nailsea East (2)
Party	Candidate	Votes	%	±%
Independent	Andrew Cole	1,705	61.4%	
Conservative	Angela Barber	1,328	47.8%	
Independent	Susan Cole	1,269	45.7%	
Conservative	Anita Heappey	864	31.1%	
Labour	John Loosley	210	7.5%	
Labour	Patricia Loosley	177	6.3%	
Turnout		5,553	55.7	+11.1
Independent gain from Liberal Democrats		Swing		
Conservative hold		Swing		

Nailsea North and West (3)
Party	Candidate	Votes	%	±%
Conservative	Jeremy Blatchford	1,537	47.0%	
Conservative	Teresa Kemp	1,415	43.3%	
Conservative	Mary Blatchford	1,360	41.6%	
Independent	Alan Clarke	1,107	33.8%	
Independent	Julia Latta	1,069	32.7%	
Liberal Democrats	Robin Bell	1,058	32.3%	
Labour	Terence Connell	857	26.2%	
Independent	Suzanne Osborne	566	17.3%	
Labour	Gaile Blake	493	15.1%	
Labour	Stephen Varney	353	10.7%	
Turnout		9,815	49.9	+11.0
Conservative hold		Swing		
Conservative hold		Swing		
Conservative hold		Swing		

Pill
Party	Candidate	Votes	%	±%
Independent	Donald Davies	603	50.7	+50.7
Independent	Nanette Kirsen	586	49.3	−30.6
Majority		17	1.4	−58.5
Turnout		1,189	43.4	+5.4
Independent hold		Swing		

Portishead Central
Party	Candidate	Votes	%	±%
Conservative	Reyna Knight	675	56.6	+18.2
Liberal Democrats	John Clark	518	43.4	+13.6
Majority		157	13.2	+4.6
Turnout		1,193	54.7	+20.1
Conservative hold		Swing		

Portishead Coast
Party	Candidate	Votes	%	±%
Conservative	David Pasley	854	68.6	+3.6
Liberal Democrats	Evelyn Elworthy	391	31.4	+5.9
Majority		463	37.2	−2.4
Turnout		1,245	54.7	+5.3
Conservative hold		Swing		

Portishead East
Party	Candidate	Votes	%	±%
Conservative	Arthur Terry	904	50.4	−6.1
Liberal Democrats	Jean Lord	430	24.0	−5.4
Labour	Abigail Fuller-Gardener	321	17.9	+3.8
Independent	Roger Whitfield	139	7.7	+7.7
Majority		474	26.4	−0.7
Turnout		1,794	42.6	+5.0
Conservative hold		Swing		

Portishead Redcliffe Bay
Party	Candidate	Votes	%	±%
Conservative	Felicity Baker	799	60.8	+8.8
Liberal Democrats	Colin Howells	515	39.2	−4.1
Majority		284	21.6	+12.8
Turnout		1,314	51.0	+1.2
Conservative hold		Swing		

Portishead South & North Weston
Party	Candidate	Votes	%	±%
Conservative	Alan McMurray	604	55.4	−4.4
Liberal Democrats	Nicholas Doddrell	279	25.6	−14.6
Labour	Paul Dunn	208	19.1	+19.1
Majority		325	29.8	+10.1
Turnout		1,091	46.0	+7.5
Conservative hold		Swing		

Portishead West
Party	Candidate	Votes	%	±%
Conservative	David Jolley	728	58.1	−5.7
Liberal Democrats	Susan Mason	323	25.8	−3.5
Labour	Kirsty Gardener	201	16.1	+9.2
Majority		405	32.3	−2.3
Turnout		1,252	49.1	+4.0
Conservative hold		Swing		

Weston-super-Mare Central (2)
Party	Candidate	Votes	%	±%
Liberal Democrats	Mike Bell	632	48.1%	
Liberal Democrats	Claire Kingsbury-Bell	521	39.7%	
Conservative	Michael Kellaway-Marriott	431	32.9%	
Conservative	Keith Morris	383	29.2%	
Labour	David Drinkwater	228	17.4%	
Green	Elisabeth Roberts	225	17.1%	
Labour	Frederick Roberts	205	15.6%	
Turnout		2,625	37.5	+4.5
Liberal Democrats gain from Conservative		Swing		
Liberal Democrats gain from Conservative		Swing		

Weston-super-Mare Clarence & Uphill (3)
Party	Candidate	Votes	%	±%
Conservative	David Poole	1,372	53.1%	
Conservative	Clive Webb	1,333	51.6%	
Conservative	Anthony Bryant	1,271	49.2%	
Independent	John Ley-Morgan	1,172	45.4%	
Liberal Democrats	Jennifer Bindon	560	21.7%	
Labour	Bryan Trotter	534	20.7%	
Labour	Josephine Bateman	533	20.6%	
Labour	June Parker	523	20.2%	
Liberal Democrats	Amanda Brading	453	17.5%	
Turnout		7,753	45.7	+5.2
Conservative hold		Swing		
Conservative hold		Swing		
Conservative hold		Swing		

Weston-super-Mare East (3)
Party	Candidate	Votes	%	±%
Labour	Richard Tucker	1,319	42.8%	
Labour	Catherine Gibbons-Antonopoulos	1,279	41.5%	
Conservative	Dawn Payne	1,214	39.4%	
Conservative	William Collins	1,211	39.3%	
Labour	Michael Lyall	1,204	39.1%	
Conservative	David Power	1,108	36.0%	
Liberal Democrats	David Cordingley	676	22.0%	
Liberal Democrats	John Harrison	620	20.1%	
Liberal Democrats	Mark Johnston	607	19.7%	
Turnout		9,238	35.3	+3.8
Labour gain from Conservative		Swing		
Labour gain from Conservative		Swing		
Conservative hold		Swing		

Weston-super-Mare Milton & Old Worle (3)
Party	Candidate	Votes	%	±%
Conservative	Rosslyn Willis	1,501	48.2%	
Conservative	Lisa Pilgrim	1,448	46.5%	
Conservative	Stephen Fudge	1,383	44.4%	
Liberal Democrats	Jennifer Gosden	872	28.0%	
Liberal Democrats	Stephen Bowering	768	24.7%	
Labour	Monish Kelly	673	21.6%	
Liberal Democrats	Norman Sycamore	673	21.6%	
Labour	Elizabeth Swan	632	20.3%	
Labour	Michael O'Regan	568	18.3%	
UKIP	Steven Pearse-Danker	430	13.8%	
UKIP	Louis Rostill	386	12.4%	
Turnout		9,334	47.5	+5.7
Conservative hold		Swing		
Conservative hold		Swing		
Conservative hold		Swing		

Weston-super-Mare North Worle (3)
Party	Candidate	Votes	%	±%
Conservative	Philip Judd	1,293	54.0%	
Conservative	Marcia Pepperall	1,183	49.4%	
Conservative	Sonia Russe	1,101	46.0%	
Liberal Democrats	Peter Hardaway	686	28.6%	
Liberal Democrats	Ronald Moon	671	28.0%	
Liberal Democrats	Richard Skinner	609	25.4%	
Labour	Jacqueline Scholes	600	25.0%	
Labour	Darius Foster	596	24.9%	
Labour	Andrew Hughes	449	18.7%	
Turnout		7,188	38.2	+11.6
Conservative hold		Swing		
Conservative hold		Swing		
Conservative hold		Swing		

Weston-super-Mare South (3)
Party	Candidate	Votes	%	±%
Labour	Ian Parker	1,190	62.3%	
Labour	Robert Bateman	1,146	60.0%	
Labour	Deborah Stone	1,090	57.0%	
Conservative	Sidney Carter	489	25.6%	
Conservative	John Butler	432	22.6%	
Conservative	Francis Drake	372	19.5%	
Liberal Democrats	Gillian Ashworth	312	16.3%	
Liberal Democrats	William Dawson	275	14.4%	
Liberal Democrats	Amanda Wilkinson	273	14.3%	
Independent	John Hopkins	154	8.1%	
Turnout		5,733	29.9	+2.5
Labour hold		Swing		
Labour hold		Swing		
Labour hold		Swing		

Weston-super-Mare South Worle (3)
Party	Candidate	Votes	%	±%
Conservative	Peter Crew	1,058	41.5%	
Conservative	David Hitchins	985	38.7%	
Conservative	Robert Cleland	957	37.6%	
Liberal Democrats	Guljinder Hayer	908	35.6%	
Liberal Democrats	Christopher Howell	781	30.7%	
Liberal Democrats	Edward Keating	763	29.9%	
Labour	David Dash	762	29.9%	
Labour	Derek Kraft	738	28.9%	
Labour	Simon Stokes	691	27.1%	
Turnout		7,643	38.1	+10.3
Conservative gain from Liberal Democrats		Swing		
Conservative gain from Liberal Democrats		Swing		
Conservative gain from Liberal Democrats		Swing		

Weston-super-Mare West (3)
Party	Candidate	Votes	%	±%
Liberal Democrats	Mark Canniford	1,335	49.5%	
Liberal Democrats	John Crockford-Hawley	1,234	45.8%	
Liberal Democrats	Robert Payne	1,014	37.6%	
Conservative	Andrew Horler	1,004	37.3%	
Conservative	Dawn Parry	912	33.8%	
Conservative	Christopher Kimitri	886	32.9%	
Labour	Oliver Ballard	361	13.4%	
Labour	Dorothy Agassiz	360	13.4%	
Labour	Simon Harrison-Morse	296	11.0%	
UKIP	Harold James	293	10.9%	
Green	Brian Outten	253	9.4%	
All The South Party	Robert Craig	137	5.1%	
Turnout		8,085	43.1	+0.8
Liberal Democrats gain from Conservative		Swing		
Liberal Democrats gain from Conservative		Swing		
Liberal Democrats gain from Conservative		Swing		

Winford
Party	Candidate	Votes	%	±%
Independent	Hugh Gregor	774	69.3	+15.2
Conservative	Michael Dolley	343	30.7	−15.2
Majority		431	38.6	+30.4
Turnout		1,117	45.3	+3.9
Independent hold		Swing		

Wraxall & Long Ashton (2)
Party	Candidate	Votes	%	±%
Conservative	Robert Cook	1,390	48.1%	
Conservative	Charles Cave	1,239	42.9%	
Independent	Anthony Butcher	1,006	34.8%	
Liberal Democrats	Angela Neale	648	22.4%	
Independent	Bridget Mackwood	430	14.9%	
Green	Stuart McQuillan	381	13.2%	
Labour	Christopher Smart	324	11.2%	
Labour	Alan Monks	307	10.6%	
Turnout		5,779	51.1	+7.8
Conservative hold		Swing		
Conservative hold		Swing		

Wrington
Party	Candidate	Votes	%	±%
Liberal Democrats	Deborah Yamanaka	673	52.3	+7.3
Conservative	Peter Ellis	613	47.7	+14.9
Majority		60	4.7	−7.5
Turnout		1,286	57.4	+3.1
Liberal Democrats hold		Swing		

Yatton (3)
Party	Candidate	Votes	%	±%
Independent	Anthony Moulin	1,824	66.5%	
Conservative	Annabel Tall	1,465	53.4%	
Conservative	Jill Iles	1,464	53.4%	
Liberal Democrats	Wendy Griggs	1,328	48.4%	
Independent	Juley Howard	985	35.9%	
Labour	Hedley Woods	415	15.1%	
Labour	Alan Bagg	387	14.1%	
Labour	Carol Bagg	355	13.0%	
Turnout		8,223	50.8	+5.6
Independent hold		Swing		
Conservative hold		Swing		
Conservative hold		Swing		
