= 2019 North Somerset Council election =

2019 UK local government election

← 2015	2 May 2019	2023 →

All 50 seats to North Somerset Council 26 seats needed for a majority
	First party	Second party	Third party
	Con	Ind	LD
Leader	Nigel Ashton	Don Davies	Mike Bell
Party	Conservative	Independent	Liberal Democrats
Last election	36 seats, 44.0%	5 seats, 9.0%	4 seats, 15.7%
Seats won	13	13	11
Seat change	▼23	▲8	▲7
Popular vote	26,246	13,904	15,532
Percentage	31.8%	16.8%	18.8%
Swing	▼12.2%	▲7.8%	▲3.1%
	Fourth party	Fifth party	Sixth party
	Lab	Por	Grn
Leader	Catherine Gibbons	N/A	Bridget Petty
Party	Labour	Portishead Ind.	Green
Last election	3 seats, 17.7%	Did not stand	1 seat, 3.3%
Seats won	6	4	3
Seat change	▲3	▲4	▲2
Popular vote	16,236	6,305	3,239
Percentage	19.7%	7.6%	3.9%
Swing	▲2.0%	▲7.6%	▲0.6%
- Map of the results of the 2019 North Somerset council election. Conservatives in blue, independent in grey, Liberal Democrats in yellow, Labour in red, Green Party in green and Portishead Independents in black.
Council control before election
Conservative
Council control after election
No overall control

The 2019 North Somerset Council election took place on 2 May 2019 to elect members of North Somerset Council in England.

North Somerset unitary council is elected every four years, with fifty councillors to be elected. Since the first election to the unitary authority in 1995, the council has either been under Conservative Party control, or no party has held a majority. The Conservatives gained a majority at the 2007 election and retained control for 12 years. Following these elections, a "rainbow coalition" of Independents, Liberal Democrats, Labour and Green councillors replaced the previous Conservative administration.

== Overall results ==
North Somerset Council election 2019
Party	Candidates						Votes		
Party	Stood	Elected	Gained	Unseated	Net	% of total	%	No.	Net %
Conservative	50	13	1	24	-23	26.0	31.8	26,426	–12.2
Independent	16	13	7	0	+7	26.0	16.8	13,904	+7.8
Liberal Democrats	22	11	8	1	+7	22.0	18.8	15,532	+3.1
Labour	45	6	2	0	+2	12.0	19.7	16,236	+2.0
Portishead Ind.	4	4	4	0	+4	8.0	7.6	6,305	+7.6
Green	3	3	3	1	+2	6.0	3.9	3,239	+0.6
UKIP	4	0	0	0	0	0.0	1.3	1,057	–2.0

== Background ==
North Somerset Council held local elections on 2 May 2019 along with councils across England as part of the 2019 local elections. The council elects its members in all-out elections, with all fifty of its councillors up for election every four years. Councillors defending their seats in this election were previously elected in 2015. In that election, thirty-six Conservative councillors, six independent councillors, four Liberal Democrat councillors, three Labour councillors and one Green councillor were elected. In subsequent by-elections, Labour gained one seat from the Conservatives.

In the build up to the 2019 election, ten incumbent councillors made up of eight Conservative councillors, one Liberal Democrat councillor and the sole Green councillor announced they would not be seeking re-election. Additionally, a group of independent councillors representing the town of Portishead received approval from the Electoral Commission to be listed as "Portishead Independents" on ballots, and the group listed candidates in three of the four wards in their town.

== Ward results ==
The ward results listed below are based on the changes from the 2015 elections, not taking into account any party defections or by-elections. Sitting councillors are marked with an asterisk (*).

=== Backwell ===
Backwell
Party	Candidate	Votes	%	±%
Green	Bridget Camilla Petty	1,121	63.5	N/A
Conservative	Peter William Soothill	572	32.4	–35.6
Labour	Daniel Bewley	73	4.1	–27.8
Majority		549	31.1	N/A
Turnout		1,774	48.88	–26.79
Registered electors		3,629		
Green gain from Conservative		Swing		

Incumbent Karen Barclay (Conservative) did not run.

=== Banwell & Winscombe ===
Banwell & Winscombe (2 seats)
Party	Candidate	Votes	%	±%
Conservative	Ann Florence Harley *	1,131	50.9	+4.0
Green	Karin Haverson	1,030	46.3	+28.8
Conservative	Jerry Patrick Daniel O'Brien *	842	37.9	+1.2
Labour	Alison Willins	458	20.6	+9.6
Labour	John Michael Parry	407	18.3	+8.4
Turnout		2,261	37.04	–35.10
Registered electors		6,104		
Conservative hold		Swing		
Green gain from Conservative		Swing		

=== Blagdon & Churchill ===
Blagdon & Churchill
Party	Candidate	Votes	%	±%
Liberal Democrats	Patrick David Keating	647	55.9	N/A
Conservative	James McDonald Davis	402	34.7	–25.8
Labour	Patrick Francis Cooney	108	9.3	–5.7
Majority		245	21.2	N/A
Turnout		1,157	38.07	37.13
Registered electors		3,097		
Liberal Democrats gain from Conservative		Swing		

Incumbent Liz Wells (Conservative) did not run.

=== Clevedon East ===
Clevedon East
Party	Candidate	Votes	%	±%
Independent	David William Shopland *	479	43.1	+6.9
Liberal Democrats	Anthony John Cherry	302	27.2	+12.2
Labour	Hannah Margaret Young	184	16.6	–0.2
Conservative	Harrison Murphy Blades	146	13.1	–18.9
Majority		177	15.9	+11.7
Turnout		1,122	32.88	–33.02
Registered electors		3,412		
Independent hold		Swing		

=== Clevedon South ===
Clevedon South
Party	Candidate	Votes	%	±%
Independent	Mark Donald Crosby	710	72.4	N/A
Conservative	Robert Michael Garner *	271	27.6	–27.2
Majority		439	44.8	N/A
Turnout		989	29.17	–35.78
Registered electors		3,391		
Independent gain from Conservative		Swing		

=== Clevedon Walton ===
Clevedon Walton
Party	Candidate	Votes	%	±%
Liberal Democrats	Caroline Susan Grace Cherry	693	49.8	N/A
Conservative	Sally Jane Moores	560	40.3	–12.8
Labour	Jacob Bettany	138	9.9	–5.5
Majority		133	9.6	N/A
Turnout		1,416	39.58	–35.66
Registered electors		3,578		
Liberal Democrats gain from Conservative		Swing		

Incumbent Colin Hall (Conservative) did not run.

=== Clevedon West ===
Clevedon West
Party	Candidate	Votes	%	±%
Liberal Democrats	Geoffrey David Richardson	638	58.2	N/A
Conservative	Christopher James Blades *	459	41.8	–6.1
Majority		179	16.3	N/A
Turnout		1,119	34.25	–34.63
Registered electors		3,267		
Liberal Democrats gain from Conservative		Swing		

=== Clevedon Yeo ===
Clevedon Yeo
Party	Candidate	Votes	%	±%
Labour	Richard John Westwood	482	51.3	+27.4
Conservative	Anita Jane Heappey	458	48.7	–9.3
Majority		24	2.6	N/A
Turnout		979	28.59	–40.28
Registered electors		3,424		
Labour gain from Conservative		Swing		

Incumbent Ericka Blades (Conservative) did not run.

=== Congresbury & Puxton ===
Congresbury & Puxton
Party	Candidate	Votes	%	±%
Liberal Democrats	Stuart Treadaway	664	54.3	N/A
Labour Co-op	Doreen Ann Higgs	391	32.0	+22.3
Conservative	Samantha Louise Pepperall	166	13.6	–20.9
Majority		273	22.3	N/A
Turnout		1,240	39.32	–32.60
Registered electors		3,154		
Liberal Democrats gain from Green		Swing		

Incumbent Tom Leimdorfer (Green) did not run.

=== Gordano Valley ===
Gordano Valley
Party	Candidate	Votes	%	±%
Conservative	Nigel Christopher Ashton *	686	49.1	–3.2
Liberal Democrats	Thomas Stephen Gravatt	542	38.8	+28.9
Labour	Alisa Sarah Milnes	168	12.0	–0.4
Majority		144	10.3	–29.2
Turnout		1,433	41.34	–35.74
Registered electors		3,466		
Conservative hold		Swing		

=== Hutton & Locking ===
Hutton & Locking (2 seats)
Party	Candidate	Votes	%	±%
Independent	Michael Mathew Solomon	1,075	52.1	+18.2
Conservative	Terence Arthur Porter *	951	46.1	–6.8
Conservative	Elfan Dyfed ap Rees *	768	37.2	−2.2
Labour	Timothy James Taylor	386	18.7	–0.1
Labour	Helen Clare Thornton	354	17.2	+1.5
Turnout		2,077	34.45	–36.61
Registered electors		6,029		
Independent gain from Conservative		Swing		
Conservative hold		Swing		

=== Long Ashton ===
Long Ashton (2 seats)
Party	Candidate	Votes	%	±%
Liberal Democrats	Ashley Cartman	1,251	45.6	+23.1
Green	Stuart Michael McQuillan	1,088	39.6	+12.9
Conservative	Charles Julian Cave *	1,065	38.8	–11.0
Conservative	Catherine Jane Stowey *	996	36.3	−9.7
Labour	David Johnson	376	13.7	–10.2
Labour	Owen John Lloyd-Jones	361	13.2	N/A
Turnout		2,762	41.22	–35.64
Registered electors		6,701		
Liberal Democrats gain from Conservative		Swing		
Green gain from Conservative		Swing		

=== Nailsea Golden Valley ===
Nailsea Golden Valley
Party	Candidate	Votes	%	±%
Independent	Andrew Nicholas Cole *	1,220	78.5	+9.2
Conservative	Jane Louise Holt	232	14.9	–15.8
Labour	Christopher James Watts	103	6.6	N/A
Majority		988	63.5	+24.9
Turnout		1,557	46.84	–33.22
Registered electors		3,324		
Independent hold		Swing		

=== Nailsea West End ===
Nailsea West End
Party	Candidate	Votes	%	±%
Independent	James Jeremy Tonkin *	876	77.9	+21.1
Conservative	Anita Smith	248	22.1	–21.1
Majority		628	55.9	+42.3
Turnout		1,139	37.27	–35.91
Registered electors		3,056		
Independent hold		Swing		

=== Nailsea Yeo ===
Nailsea Yeo
Party	Candidate	Votes	%	±%
Independent	Michael John Bird	685	59.5	N/A
Conservative	Mary Blatchford *	280	24.3	–17.7
Labour	Jonathan David Argles	116	10.1	–6.1
Liberal Democrats	David Anthony Howells	71	6.2	N/A
Majority		405	35.2	N/A
Turnout		1,158	33.48	–36.82
Registered electors		3,459		
Independent gain from Conservative		Swing		

=== Nailsea Youngwood ===
Nailsea Youngwood
Party	Candidate	Votes	%	±%
Independent	Sandra Hearne	587	52.0	N/A
Conservative	Angela Janice Barber *	411	36.4	–18.7
Labour	Denise Houlbrook	130	11.5	N/A
Majority		176	15.6	N/A
Turnout		1,137	39.96	–31.38
Registered electors		2,845		
Independent gain from Conservative		Swing		

=== Pill ===
Pill
Party	Candidate	Votes	%	±%
Independent	Donald Alan Davies *	1,322	90.7	+34.1
Conservative	Amanda Louise Weekes	133	9.1	–12.6
Majority		1,189	81.6	+46.7
Turnout		1,463	42.62	–27.06
Registered electors		3,433		
Independent hold		Swing		

=== Portishead East ===
Portishead East (2 seats)
Party	Candidate	Votes	%	±%
Portishead Ind.	Caritas Idris Caradoc Charles	1,425	71.5	N/A
Portishead Ind.	Paul Andrew Gardner	1,415	71.0	N/A
Conservative	David Harry Collingwood Oyns *	347	17.4	–30.7
Conservative	David Graham Pasley *	308	15.5	−30.5
Labour	Sophie Ann Davies	166	8.3	–11.9
Labour	William Filer	135	6.8	N/A
UKIP	Matthew James Woods	73	3.7	N/A
Turnout		2,004	35.96	–29.44
Registered electors		5,573		
Portishead Ind. gain from Conservative		Swing		
Portishead Ind. gain from Conservative		Swing		

=== Portishead North ===
Portishead North
Party	Candidate	Votes	%	±%
Portishead Ind.	Timothy James Snaden	1,218	68.2	N/A
Conservative	Reyna G. Knight *	396	22.2	–26.8
Labour	Lennon Manners-Lolley	169	9.5	–7.0
Majority		822	46.1	N/A
Turnout		1,799	45.76	–26.91
Registered electors		3,931		
Portishead Ind. gain from Conservative		Swing		

=== Portishead South ===
Portishead South
Party	Candidate	Votes	%	±%
Liberal Democrats	Huw Thomas James	590	41.4	+19.6
Conservative	Peter Henry Burden *	587	41.2	–14.7
Labour	Wayne Martin Harper	248	17.4	–4.8
Majority		3	0.2	N/A
Turnout		1,530	45.77	–27.74
Registered electors		3,343		
Liberal Democrats gain from Conservative		Swing		

=== Portishead West ===
Portishead West (2 seats)
Party	Candidate	Votes	%	±%
Portishead Ind.	Nicola Jane Holland	2,247	68.2	N/A
Independent	John Nigel Cato	1,116	33.9	N/A
Liberal Democrats	Susan Ann Mason	891	27.1	+4.3
Conservative	Felicity Diane Baker *	634	19.3	–26.6
Conservative	David Richard Jolley *	493	15.0	−26.9
Labour	Stephen Alan Harrison	211	6.4	–11.0
Labour	William Stanley Stone	167	5.1	N/A
Turnout		3,306	45.07	–28.50
Registered electors		7,336		
Portishead Ind. gain from Conservative		Swing		
Independent gain from Conservative		Swing		

=== Weston-super-Mare Central ===
Weston-super-Mare Central (2 seats)
Party	Candidate	Votes	%	±%
Liberal Democrats	Mike Bell *	1,079	56.9	+15.8
Liberal Democrats	Robert Payne	842	44.4	+13.3
Conservative	Richard Paul Nightingale *	507	26.7	–9.3
Labour	Holly Elizabeth Law	457	24.1	+3.4
Conservative	Katrina Rebecca Sprague	374	19.7	−10.4
Labour	Rodney Kevin Bryant Tyler	332	17.5	−2.9
Turnout		1,925	29.22	–22.93
Registered electors		6,588		
Liberal Democrats hold		Swing		
Liberal Democrats gain from Conservative		Swing		

=== Weston-super-Mare Hillside ===
Weston-super-Mare Hillside (2 seats)
Party	Candidate	Votes	%	±%
Liberal Democrats	Mark Chamings Canniford *	1,516	67.5	+19.9
Liberal Democrats	John Richard Crockford-Hawley *	1,429	63.6	+16.8
Conservative	Christopher Nettleton	334	14.9	–6.4
Labour	Hilary Anne Coombes	293	13.0	+1.1
Labour	Neil Daniel Norton	262	11.7	+0.5
Conservative	Michael David Wedlake	258	11.5	−8.8
UKIP	Paul Coles	198	8.8	–7.8
Turnout		2,271	34.09	–25.86
Registered electors		6,662		
Liberal Democrats hold		Swing		
Liberal Democrats hold		Swing		

=== Weston-super-Mare Kewstoke ===
Weston-super-Mare Kewstoke (2 seats)
Party	Candidate	Votes	%	±%
Conservative	Lisa Jane Pilgrim *	1,052	44.9	–3.1
Conservative	Rosslyn Willis *	1,028	43.9	+1.6
Liberal Democrats	Richard Skinner	636	27.1	+10.5
Labour	Peter Leo McAleer	518	22.1	+5.6
Labour	John Anthony Cadwallader	462	19.7	+3.5
UKIP	George Arthur Dellipiani	434	18.5	–5.4
Turnout		2,375	33.96	–13.54
Registered electors		6,993		
Conservative hold		Swing		
Conservative hold		Swing		

=== Weston-super-Mare Mid Worle ===
Weston-super-Mare Mid Worle
Party	Candidate	Votes	%	±%
Conservative	Gillian Myra Bute	331	33.1	+1.4
Liberal Democrats	Hugh George Eckett	287	28.7	+19.4
Labour	Dawn Parry	270	27.0	–0.8
Independent	John James Boxshall	112	11.2	N/A
Majority		44	4.4	–1.1
Turnout		1,023	30.94	–32.67
Registered electors		3,306		
Conservative hold		Swing		

Incumbent Robert Cleland (Conservative) ran in Weston-super-Mare South instead.

=== Weston-super-Mare Milton ===
Weston-super-Mare Milton (2 seats)
Party	Candidate	Votes	%	±%
Labour	Richard Mark Tucker *	1,099	50.1	+18.6
Labour	Catherine Gibbons-Antonopoulos	935	42.6	+16.1
Conservative	Peter George Fox	685	31.2	+2.8
Conservative	Patricia Ruth Oliver	516	23.5	−4.5
Independent	Michael John Kellaway-Marriott	438	20.0	N/A
Liberal Democrats	Joan Dunne	368	16.8	+7.0
Turnout		2,217	31.05	–35.76
Registered electors		7,141		
Labour hold		Swing		
Labour gain from Conservative		Swing		

Incumbent Martin Williams (Conservative) did not run.

=== Weston-super-Mare North Worle ===
Weston-super-Mare North Worle (2 seats)
Party	Candidate	Votes	%	±%
Conservative	Marc John Aplin	839	48.2	+20.3
Conservative	Marcia Louise Pepperall *	665	38.2	+2.1
Liberal Democrats	Lewis Dean Treloar	515	29.6	+14.3
Labour	Denise Estelle Hunt *	488	28.1	+9.6
Liberal Democrats	Alan Stuart Rice	454	26.1	N/A
Labour	James Gavin Willis-Boden	352	20.2	+2.2
Turnout		1,779	28.50	–38.33
Registered electors		6,243		
Conservative hold		Swing		
Conservative gain from Independent		Swing		

Incumbent Denise Hunt had previously gained the seat for Labour from North Somerset First Independents following a by-election in 2017.

=== Weston-super-Mare South ===
Weston-super-Mare South (2 seats)
Party	Candidate	Votes	%	±%
Labour	Ian Roger Parker *	886	75.7	
Labour	James Raymond Clayton *	849	72.5	
Conservative	Sidney John Carter	332	28.4	
Conservative	Robert Francis Doxford Cleland *	275	23.5	
Turnout		2,630	41.80	–9.71
Registered electors		6,295		
Labour hold		Swing		
Labour hold		Swing		

Ward previously known as Weston-super-Mare Bournville.

=== Weston-super-Mare South Worle ===
Weston-super-Mare South Worle (2 seats)
Party	Candidate	Votes	%	±%
Conservative	Peter Crew *	741	46.3	+3.1
Conservative	David Charles Hitchins *	663	41.4	+1.5
Labour	Gillian Ann Carpenter	576	36.0	+10.6
Labour	David Thomas Dash	553	34.6	+11.1
Liberal Democrats	Ella Jade Sayce	374	23.4	+6.2
Turnout		1,662	24.87	–37.90
Registered electors		6,682		
Conservative hold		Swing		
Conservative hold		Swing		

=== Weston-super-Mare Uphill ===
Weston-super-Mare Uphill (2 seats)
Party	Candidate	Votes	%	±%
Independent	John Ley-Morgan *	1,136	49.2	+23.9
Conservative	Anthony Peter Bryant *	604	26.2	–3.5
Conservative	Clive Harold Thomas Webb	464	20.1	+2.0
Labour	Brigitte Amanda Nowers	459	19.9	+4.5
Liberal Democrats	Fraser Kingsley Coppin	427	18.6	+7.0
Labour	Paul Anthony Seaton	405	17.6	+2.7
UKIP	Colin Vennall	352	15.3	–7.0
Independent	Anne Patricia Bunn	286	12.4	N/A
Turnout		2,331	35.75	–32.09
Registered electors		6,520		
Independent hold		Swing		
Conservative hold		Swing		

=== Weston-super-Mare Winterstoke ===
Weston-super-Mare Winterstoke (2 seats)
Party	Candidate	Votes	%	±%
Conservative	Sarah Dawn Codling *	590	56.2	+14.5
Labour	Ciaran Tristan Cronnelly	466	44.4	+20.3
Labour	Valerie Anne Donegan	450	42.9	+20.6
Conservative	Christopher George Vickery	427	40.7	+7.1
Turnout		1,101	17.76	–35.50
Registered electors		6,199		
Conservative hold		Swing		
Labour gain from Conservative		Swing		

Incumbent Dawn Payne (Conservative) did not run.

=== Wick St Lawrence & St Georges ===
Wick St Lawrence & St Georges
Party	Candidate	Votes	%	±%
Conservative	Ruth Lesley Jacobs *	448	60.4	+14.6
Labour	Ciro La Motta	294	39.6	+20.4
Majority		154	20.8	–1.5
Turnout		791	22.03	–43.39
Registered electors		3,590		
Conservative hold		Swing		

=== Winford ===
Winford
Party	Candidate	Votes	%	±%
Independent	Hugh Walter Gregor	798	73.3	+26.2
Conservative	Jeremy Robert Blatchford	290	26.7	–26.2
Majority		508	46.7	N/A
Turnout		1,100	31.75	–41.79
Registered electors		3,465		
Independent gain from Conservative		Swing		

Incumbent Nick Wilton (Conservative) did not run.

=== Wrington ===
Wrington
Party	Candidate	Votes	%	±%
Independent	Stephen John Hogg	1,180	78.4	N/A
Conservative	Luke Smith	220	14.6	–29.6
Labour	Ian Hamilton	105	7.0	–2.7
Majority		960	63.8	N/A
Turnout		1,513	46.06	–31.87
Registered electors		3,285		
Independent gain from Liberal Democrats		Swing		

Incumbent Deborah Yamanaka (Liberal Democrat) did not run.

=== Yatton ===
Yatton (2 seats)
Party	Candidate	Votes	%	±%
Independent	Steven John Bridger	1,874	67.6	N/A
Liberal Democrats	Wendy Hilda Griggs	1,316	47.5	+21.2
Conservative	Jill Rosemary Joyce Iles *	619	22.3	–14.2
Conservative	James Callum MacQueen	442	15.9	−16.3
Labour	Adrian Baker	240	8.7	–2.6
Labour	Kevin William Rodd O'Brien	154	5.6	−1.6
Turnout		2,783	41.47	–33.50
Registered electors		6,711		
Independent gain from Conservative		Swing		
Liberal Democrats gain from Conservative		Swing		

Incumbent Judith Hadley (Conservative) did not run.

== By-elections ==
=== Portishead East ===
Portishead East: 6 May 2021
Party	Candidate	Votes	%	±%
Portishead Ind.	Caroline Davinia Goddard	768	40.4	−30.6
Conservative	David Harry Collingwood Oyns	609	32.1	+14.7
Liberal Democrats	Paul Anthony Welton	303	16.0	N/A
Labour	Sophie Ann Davies	219	11.5	+3.2
Turnout		1,899	34.15	–1.81
Registered electors		5,701		
Portishead Ind. hold		Swing		

=== Congresbury & Puxton ===
A by-election was called due to the resignation of the incumbent Liberal Democrat councillor.

Congresbury & Puxton: 22 July 2021
Party	Candidate	Votes	%	±%
Green	Phil Neve	594	64.5	N/A
Conservative	Samantha Pepperall	270	29.3	+15.7
Labour	Dawn Parry	57	6.2	−25.8
Majority		324	35.2	N/A
Turnout		922	28.6	−10.7
Green gain from Liberal Democrats		Swing	▲24.4	
