= 2003 North Somerset Council election =

2003 UK local government election

← 1999	1 May 2003	2007 →

All 61 seats to North Somerset Council 31 seats needed for a majority
	First party	Second party	Third party
	Con	LD	Lab
Party	Conservative	Liberal Democrats	Labour
Last election	32, N/A	11 seats, N/A	13 seats, N/A
Seats won	24	24	10
Seat change	▼8	▲13	▼3
Popular vote	38,862	39,307	20,620
Percentage	37.6%	38.0%	20.0%
Swing	N/A	N/A	N/A
	Fourth party	Fifth party
	Ind	Grn
Party	Independent	Green
Last election	4 seats, N/A	1 seat, N/A
Seats won	3	1
Seat change	▼1	-
Popular vote	3,781	627
Percentage	3.7%	0.6%
Swing	N/A	N/A
- Map of the results of the 2003 North Somerset council election. Conservatives in blue, independent in grey, Liberal Democrats in yellow, Labour in red and Green Party in green.
Council control before election
Conservative
Council control after election
No Overall Control

The 2003 North Somerset Council election took place on 1 May 2003 to elect members of North Somerset Unitary Council in Somerset, England. The whole council was up for election and the Conservative Party lost overall control of the council to no overall control.

== Election result ==
North Somerset local election result 2003
Party	Seats	Gains	Losses	Net gain/loss	Seats %	Votes %	Votes	+/−
Conservative	24			-8	39.3	37.6	38,862	
Liberal Democrats	23			+11	37.7	38.0	39,307	
Labour	10			-1	16.4	20.0	20,620	
Independent	3			-1	4.9	3.7	3,781	
Green	1			0	1.6	0.6	627	
UKIP	0			0	0	0.1	124	
Others	0			-1	0	0	0	

== Ward results ==
Backwell (2)
Party	Candidate	Votes	%	±%
Conservative	Felicity Baker	1,023	61.5%	
Conservative	Peter Burden	903	54.3%	
Liberal Democrats	Helen Madge	648	39.0%	
Liberal Democrats	Alan Armstrong	517	31.1%	
Labour	David Punter	234	14.1%	
Turnout		3,325		

Banwell and Winscombe (3)
Party	Candidate	Votes	%	±%
Conservative	Ann Harley	1,311	55.5%	
Conservative	Anthony Lake	1,297	54.9%	
Conservative	Hugh Parsons	1,261	53.4%	
Liberal Democrats	Michael Bibb	846		
Liberal Democrats	Amanda Brading	801		
Liberal Democrats	Christopher Luke	649		
Labour	Stanley Banks	336		
Labour	Simon Arlidge	324		
Labour	Andrew Hughes	263		
Turnout		7,088		

Blagdon and Churchill
Party	Candidate	Votes	%	±%
Conservative	Elizabeth Wells	644	57.8	
Liberal Democrats	Anthony Hughes	372	33.4	
Labour	Ernest Barnhurst	98	8.8	
Majority		272	24.4	
Turnout		1,114		

Clevedon Central
Party	Candidate	Votes	%	±%
Labour	Michael Nobes	375	51.1	
Conservative	Carl Francis-Pester	219	29.8	
Liberal Democrats	Anne Carpenter	140	19.1	
Majority		156	21.3	
Turnout		734		

Clevedon East
Party	Candidate	Votes	%	±%
Independent	David Shopland	445	47.7	
Conservative	William Lavelle	227	24.3	
Liberal Democrats	Mary Mclean	144	15.4	
Labour	Jeremy Callaghan	117	12.5	
Majority		218	23.4	
Turnout		933		

Clevedon North
Party	Candidate	Votes	%	±%
Conservative	Lionel Bates	495	58.4	
Liberal Democrats	Joan Watkins	229	27.0	
Labour	John Farley	123	14.5	
Majority		266	31.4	
Turnout		847		

Clevedon South
Party	Candidate	Votes	%	±%
Labour	Alan Cotton	316	39.4	
Liberal Democrats	Graham Watkins	271	33.7	
Conservative	Christopher Blades	216	26.9	
Majority		45	5.6	
Turnout		803		

Clevedon Walton
Party	Candidate	Votes	%	±%
Conservative	George Morris	592	52.4	
Liberal Democrats	Jack Dagnall	537	47.6	
Majority		55	4.9	
Turnout		1,129		

Clevedon West
Party	Candidate	Votes	%	±%
Labour	Chanel Stevens	409	45.9	
Conservative	Ericka Blades	251	28.2	
Liberal Democrats	Patrick Mcneill	231	25.9	
Majority		158	17.7	
Turnout		891		

Clevedon Yeo
Party	Candidate	Votes	%	±%
Conservative	John Norton-Sealey	351	45.7	
Labour	Bryan Moore	240	31.3	
Liberal Democrats	Julian Carpenter	177	23.0	
Majority		111	14.5	
Turnout		768		

Congresbury
Party	Candidate	Votes	%	±%
Green	Thomas Leimdorfer	627	58.7	
Conservative	Gillian Bute	442	41.3	
Majority		185	17.3	
Turnout		1,069		

Easton-in-Gordano
Party	Candidate	Votes	%	±%
Conservative	Peter Fisher	636	61.4	
Liberal Democrats	Wendy Griggs	237	22.9	
Labour	Derek Waters	163	15.7	
Majority		399	38.5	
Turnout		1,036		

Gordano
Party	Candidate	Votes	%	±%
Conservative	Nigel Ashton	639	67.1	
Liberal Democrats	Charles Pritchard	198	20.8	
Labour	Barry Cooper	115	12.1	
Majority		441	46.3	
Turnout		952		

Hutton and Locking (2)
Party	Candidate	Votes	%	±%
Conservative	Ian Peddlesden	1,039	54.7%	
Conservative	Elfan Rees	946	49.8%	
Liberal Democrats	Bryan Mcgrath	687		
Liberal Democrats	Richard Bartlett	637		
Labour	Timothy Taylor	270		
Labour	David Roxburgh	220		
Turnout		3,799		

Kewstoke
Party	Candidate	Votes	%	±%
Conservative	Ian Porter	424	52.7	
Liberal Democrats	David Evans	255	31.7	
Labour	Jacqueline Scholes	125	15.5	
Majority		169	21.0	
Turnout		804		

Nailsea East (2)
Party	Candidate	Votes	%	±%
Liberal Democrats	Andrew Cole	1,119	62.1%	
Liberal Democrats	Robert Coleman	986	54.7%	
Conservative	Angela Barber	836		
Conservative	Anita Heappey	663		
Turnout		3,604		

Nailsea North and West (3)
Party	Candidate	Votes	%	±%
Liberal Democrats	Robert Steadman	1,062	39.0%	
Conservative	Jeremy Blatchford	1,031	37.9%	
Liberal Democrats	James Tonkin	960	35.3%	
Conservative	Mary Blatchford	958		
Conservative	Suzanne Williams	955		
Liberal Democrats	Alan Clarke	954		
Labour	Julian Parry	756		
Labour	Sarah Obrien	745		
Labour	Catherine Elliott	738		
Turnout		8,159		

Pill
Party	Candidate	Votes	%	±%
Labour	Glyndwr Duck	587	61.2	
Conservative	Adrian Phillips	222	23.1	
Liberal Democrats	Peter Maw	150	15.6	
Majority		365	38.1	
Turnout		959		

Portishead Central
Party	Candidate	Votes	%	±%
Liberal Democrats	John Clark	204	41.3	
Conservative	James Mcmurray	174	35.2	
Labour	Andrew Hamblin	116	23.5	
Majority		30	6.1	
Turnout		494		

Portishead Coast
Party	Candidate	Votes	%	±%
Conservative	James Walters	608	59.5	
Liberal Democrats	Philip Palmer	414	40.5	
Majority		194	19.0	
Turnout		1,022		

Portishead East
Party	Candidate	Votes	%	±%
Conservative	Arthur Terry	386	39.4	
Liberal Democrats	Daisy Bickley	309	31.6	
Labour	Roger Whitfield	284	29.0	
Majority		77	7.9	
Turnout		979		

Portishead Redcliffe Bay
Party	Candidate	Votes	%	±%
Conservative	John Daws	606	60.2	
Liberal Democrats	John Clark	401	39.8	
Majority		205	20.4	
Turnout		1,007		

Portishead South and North Weston
Party	Candidate	Votes	%	±%
Liberal Democrats	Jonathan Gething	389	41.4	
Conservative	Alan Mcmurray	299	31.8	
Labour	Patricia Gardener	252	26.8	
Majority		90	9.6	
Turnout		940		

Portishead West
Party	Candidate	Votes	%	±%
Independent	Nicholas Brown	898	81.9	
Conservative	Rosalind Cruse	198	18.1	
Majority		700	63.9	
Turnout		1,096		

Weston Super Mare Central (2)
Party	Candidate	Votes	%	±%
Liberal Democrats	John Crockford-Hawley	693	52.4%	
Liberal Democrats	Ian Baker	655	49.5%	
Conservative	Mark Terry-Short	375		
Conservative	David Hunt	360		
Labour	Josephine Bateman	222		
Labour	Frederick Roberts	199		
Independent	Adam Nash	92		
UKIP	Alan James	51		
Turnout		2,647		

Weston Super Mare Clarence and Uphill (3)
Party	Candidate	Votes	%	±%
Conservative	Michael Roe	1,385	59.6%	
Conservative	Anthony Bryant	1,368	58.9%	
Conservative	Clive Webb	1,345	57.9%	
Liberal Democrats	Kenneth Tucker	647		
Liberal Democrats	Peter Solomon	620		
Liberal Democrats	David Hobb-Titchard	599		
Labour	Stephen Varney	339		
Labour	Jamie Dormer-Durling	337		
Labour	Karoline Bateman	328		
Turnout		6,968		

Weston Super Mare East (3)
Party	Candidate	Votes	%	±%
Labour	Derek Kraft	1,034	58.1%	
Labour	Richard Tucker	990	55.6%	
Labour	Muriel Kraft	944	53.0%	
Liberal Democrats	Grace Atkinson	629		
Liberal Democrats	Bryan Osborne	610		
Conservative	Raymond Hicks	591		
Liberal Democrats	Brian Hampson	543		
Turnout		5,341		

Weston Super Mare Milton and Old Worle (3)
Party	Candidate	Votes	%	±%
Liberal Democrats	Jennifer Gosden	1,169	42.7%	
Liberal Democrats	Astra Brand	1,118	40.8%	
Liberal Democrats	Rosslyn Willis	1,112	40.6%	
Conservative	Peter Crew	1,025		
Conservative	Patrick Taylor	1,018		
Conservative	Frederick Hogg	1,009		
Labour	Simon Stokes	481		
Labour	Elizabeth Swan	450		
Labour	William Swan	424		
Independent	Jeffrey Bullingham	407		
Turnout		8,213		

Weston Super Mare North Worle (3)
Party	Candidate	Votes	%	±%
Liberal Democrats	Alan Hockridge	1,356	71.0%	
Liberal Democrats	Ronald Moon	1,236	64.7%	
Liberal Democrats	Richard Skinner	1,143	60.0%	
Conservative	Frederick Parsons	627		
Conservative	Frederick Gamble	610		
Labour	Paul Francis	268		
Labour	Lynda Pearcey	248		
Labour	Simon Morse	243		
Turnout		5,731		

Weston Super Mare South (3)
Party	Candidate	Votes	%	±%
Labour	Ian Parker	1,122	71.6%	
Labour	Mari Owens	1,057	67.4%	
Labour	Robert Bateman	1,056	67.4%	
Liberal Democrats	Raymond Armstrong	388		
Liberal Democrats	Celia Davies	386		
Liberal Democrats	June How	357		
Conservative	Michael Marriott	338		
Turnout		4,704		

Weston Super Mare South Worle (3)
Party	Candidate	Votes	%	±%
Liberal Democrats	Sally Tabrett	989	46.9%	
Liberal Democrats	Colin Golland	953	45.2%	
Liberal Democrats	Andrew Wright	921	43.7%	
Labour	Christopher Flint	621		
Labour	Michael Lyall	608		
Labour	Christopher Belton-Reed	584		
Conservative	Ena King	533		
Conservative	Sidney Carter	526		
Conservative	Alan Lane	479		
Independent	John Heenan	109		
Turnout		6,323		

Weston Super Mare West (3)
Party	Candidate	Votes	%	±%
Liberal Democrats	Mark Canniford	1,337	54.5%	
Liberal Democrats	Michael Bell	1,336	54.5%	
Liberal Democrats	Robert Payne	1,179	48.1%	
Conservative	Andrew Horler	895		
Conservative	Robert Cleland	864		
Conservative	Michael Fazackerley	853		
Independent	Paul Spencer	223		
Labour	Robert Craig	210		
Labour	Christopher Hollebon	197		
Labour	Vanessa Hollebon	188		
UKIP	Mervyn Gibbs	73		
Turnout		7,355		

Winford
Party	Candidate	Votes	%	±%
Conservative	Audrey Telling	456	57.6	
Labour	Jessica Monks	335	42.4	
Majority		121	15.3	
Turnout		791		

Wraxall and Long Ashton (2)
Party	Candidate	Votes	%	±%
Conservative	Robert Cook	1,097	56.6%	
Conservative	Howard Roberts	1,000	51.6%	
Liberal Democrats	Angela Neale	807		
Liberal Democrats	Donald Barritt	653		
Labour	Christopher Smart	317		
Turnout		3,874		

Wrington
Party	Candidate	Votes	%	±%
Liberal Democrats	Deborah Yamanaka	708	67.8	
Conservative	Teresa Kemp	336	32.2	
Majority		372	35.6	
Turnout		1,044		

Yatton (3)
Party	Candidate	Votes	%	±%
Independent	Greta Lewis	1,607	71.1%	
Liberal Democrats	Isabel Cummings	1,388	61.4%	
Liberal Democrats	Peter Kehoe	1,251	55.4%	
Conservative	Stanley Kehoe	1,048		
Conservative	Alison Tull	872		
Labour	Douglas May	612		
Turnout		6,778		
