= Weston-super-Mare Town Hall =

Municipal building in Weston-super-Mare, Somerset, England

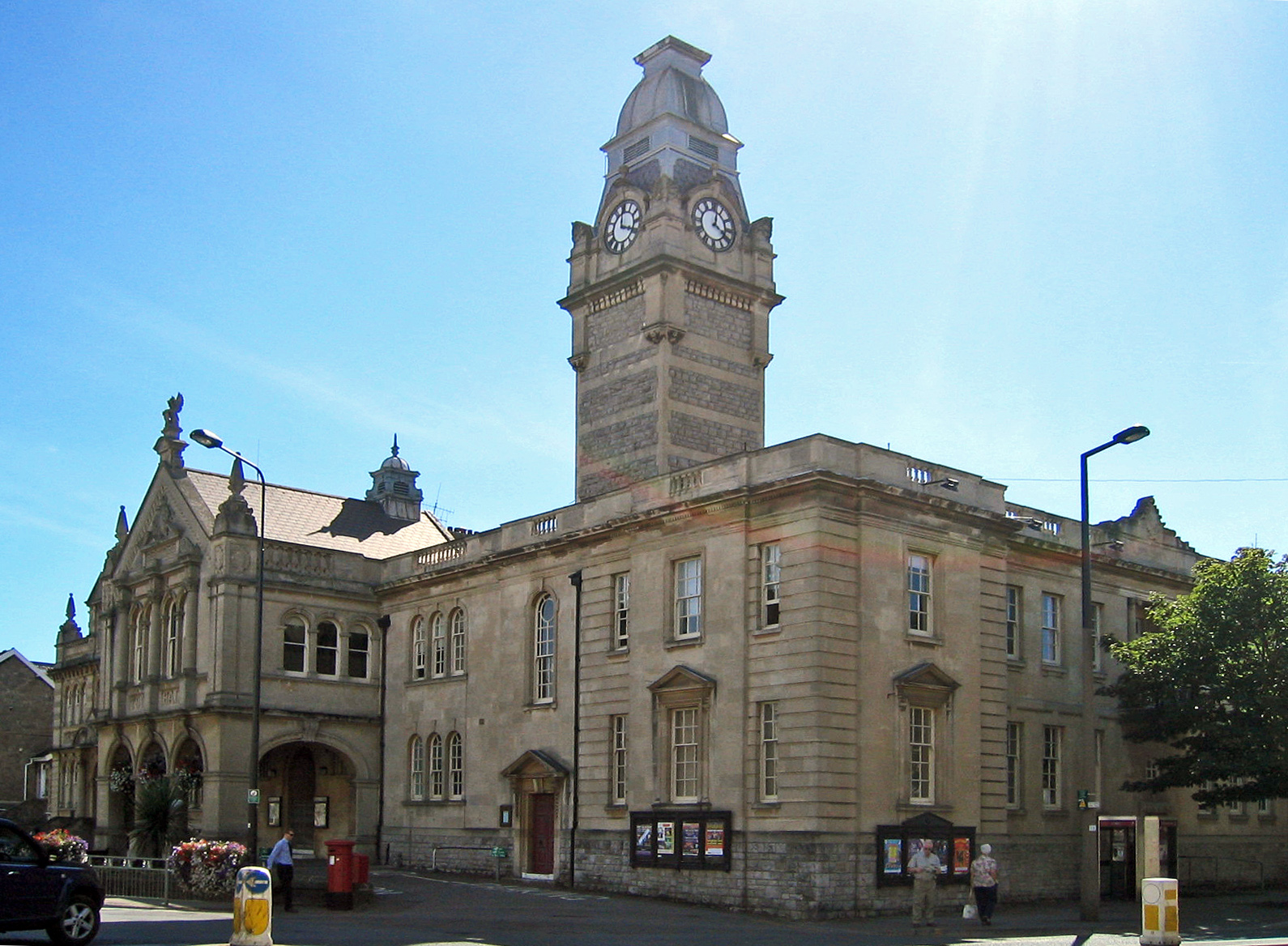
- Weston-super-Mare Town Hall (from the north-east)

- Shown in Somerset
- 51.3455°N 2.9773°W
- Location: Weston-super-Mare

History
- Built: 1859

Site notes
- Architect(s): James Wilson and Hans Price
- Architectural style: Italianate style

Listed Building – Grade II
- Official name: The Town Hall
- Designated: 19 May 1983
- Reference no.: 1138148

Weston-super-Mare Town Hall is a municipal building in Walliscote Grove Road in Weston-super-Mare, Somerset, England. The building, which is the headquarters of North Somerset Council, is a Grade II listed building.

== History ==
After town improvement commissioners were appointed in 1842, one of their early actions was to identify a suitable meeting place: initially they met in the old Plough Hotel in the High Street and then, from 1848, in a Wesleyan Chapel. Finding this arrangement inadequate, they decided to procure a bespoke town hall: the site they selected was in a rapidly developing part of the town close to the proposed new Weston-super-Mare railway station. However, after the town clerk declared a personal interest in the land, and concerns were raised about the probity of the transaction, the local rector, The Venerable Henry Law, acquired the land himself and gifted it to the town commissioners.

The new building was designed by James Wilson in the Italianate style, built at a cost of £3,000, and opened on 3 March 1859. That same year the commissioners became the local board of health for the district. The original design of the building involved a symmetrical main frontage facing onto Walliscote Grove Road, with an adjacent tower at the north-east corner. Internally, the principal room was the central Hall, which was also used as a courtroom (for the County Court and local Petty Sessions); there was also a sizeable meeting room for the Board of Commissioners, along with magistrates' rooms, police offices and cells.

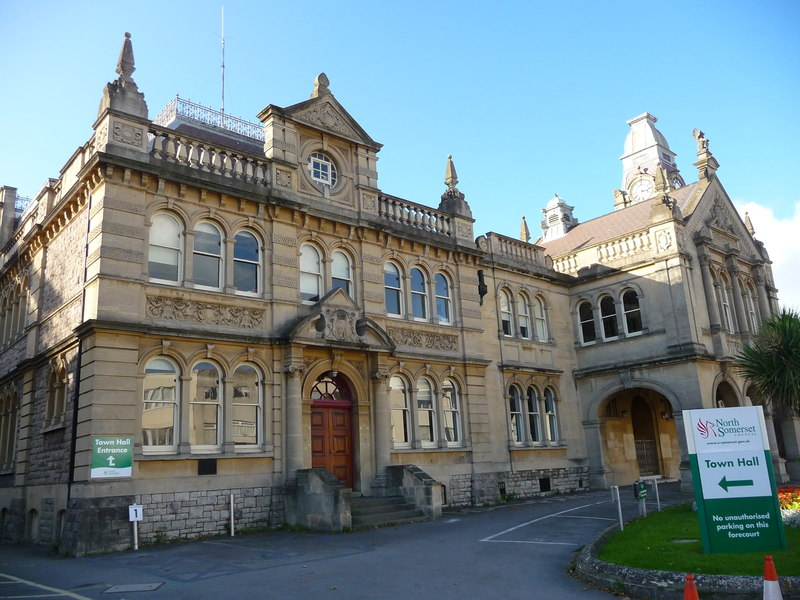
The south wing and porte-cochère of 1897.

Weston's Local Board became the Urban District Council in 1894. In 1897 The town hall was extended southwards and eastwards, to a design by Hans Price, creating a new frontage along Walliscote Grove Road. In the centre, projecting forward from the rest, was an arcaded porte-cochère with four round headed windows on the first floor, flanked by Corinthian order columns, and a pediment above. A new wing to the south had an arched doorway with an elaborate carved pediment, twin round headed windows on the first floor and an oculus above. To the north Price provided a new tower, which was equipped with a chiming clock (by W. J. Perret of Weston) and four bells, cast by Llewellins & James of Bristol. Internally, the principal room (above the porte-cochère) was the new council chamber. The total cost of the new extension was around £5,000. A new committee room was added to the complex in 1909; and in 1927 a north wing was added, built in a sympathetic style, which extended along Oxford Street (leaving Wilson's earlier town hall almost entirely enclosed).

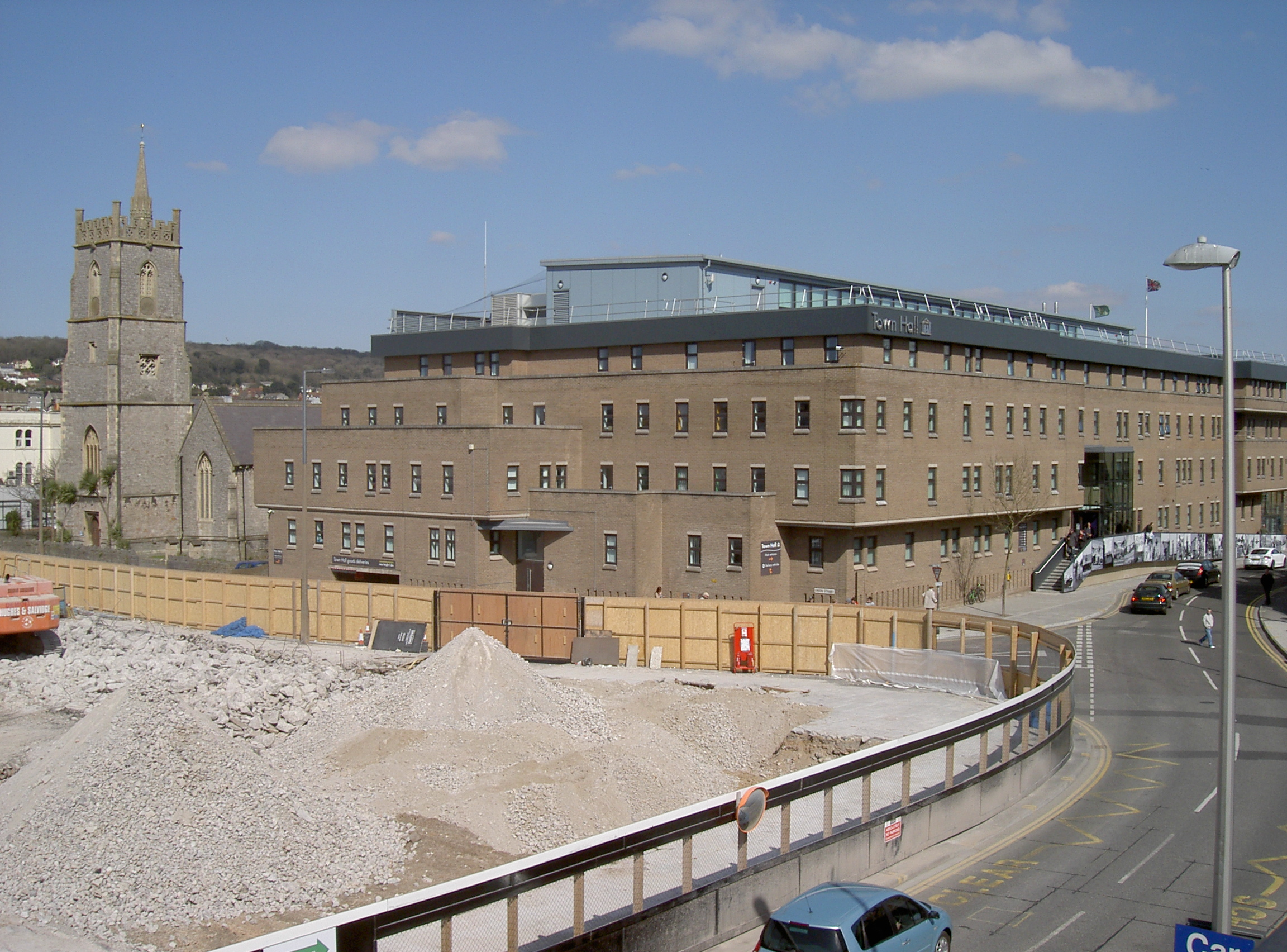
1970s extension (viewed from the south-west).

The building continued to serve as the headquarters of Weston-super-Mare Municipal Borough Council and remained the local seat of government after the enlarged Woodspring District Council was formed in 1974. A large modern red-brick extension was built behind the town hall for use by Woodspring District Council in the 1970s. The town hall then became the home of the new unitary authority for the area, North Somerset Council, in 1996.

The 1970s extension was extensively refurbished and enhanced by Willmott Dixon at a cost of £10 million, to a design by Alec French Architects, to facilitate open plan working and to create a new district library in 2012. Additionally, a new police inquiries desk was established in the town hall in 2013.
