= 2023 North Somerset Council election =

2023 English local election

- 4 May 2023

All 50 seats to North Somerset Council 26 seats needed for a majority

	First party	Second party	Third party
Leader	Nigel Ashton	Catherine Gibbons	Mike Bell
Party	Conservative	Labour	Liberal Democrats
Last election	13 seats, 31.6%	6 seats, 19.7%	11 seats, 18.8%
Seats before	13	6	10
Seats won	13	10	9
Seat change	-	▲4	▼2
Popular vote	25,676	16,784	18,207
Percentage	32.6%	21.3%	23.1%
Swing	▲1.0pp	▲1.6pp	▲4.3pp
	Fourth party	Fifth party	Sixth party
Leader	Steve Bridger	Bridget Petty	N/A
Party	Independent	Green	Portishead Ind.
Last election	13 seats, 16.8%	3 seats, 3.9%	4 seats, 7.3%
Seats before	13	4	4
Seats won	8	7	3
Seat change	▼5	▲3	▼1
Popular vote	7,164	7,393	3,462
Percentage	9.1%	9.4%	4.4%
Swing	▼7.7pp	▲5.5pp	▼2.9pp
- Map of the results of the 2023 North Somerset council election. Conservatives in blue, independent in grey, Liberal Democrats in yellow, Labour in red, Green Party in green and Portishead Independents in navy.
Leader before election
Steve Bridger
Independent
No overall control
Leader after election
Mike Bell
Liberal Democrat
No overall control

The 2023 North Somerset Council election took place on 4 May 2023 to elect all 50 councillors to the North Somerset Council in England. It was conducted on the same day as the other local elections across England.

Prior to the election the council was under no overall control, being run by a 'rainbow coalition' of Liberal Democrats, Labour, Greens and independent councillors, led by independent councillor Steve Bridger. Following the election the council remained under no overall control and a similar coalition emerged, but led by Liberal Democrat councillor Mike Bell.

== Background ==
North Somerset Council is elected every 4 years, with all council seats being up for election. Following the 2019 election a rainbow coalition consisting of the North Somerset Independent Group, the Liberal Democrats, the Labour Party, the Portishead Independents and the Green Party had formed, initially led by Independent Group leader, Don Davies. Davies resigned as leader in May 2022 and was succeeded by his independent colleague Steve Bridger. Liberal Democrat councillor Mike Bell served as deputy leader in the administration prior to 2023.

Throughout the previous council's term from 2019 to 2023, bus and transport services became a considerable issue in the local area. With services such as the X5 Weston-Super-Mare to Cribbs Causeway being cut or reduced and other services such as the X2 Yatton to Bristol and 126 Weston to Wells being axed entirely. In the later part of the council's term a new 'demand bus service' was being created and the council successfully saved some services from being entirely removed.

== Overall results ==
North Somerset Council 2023
Party	Candidates						Votes		
Party	Stood	Elected	Gained	Unseated	Net	% of total	%	No.	Net %
Conservative	49	13	4	4	0	26%	32.6%	26,676	+1.0
Labour	43	10	5	1	+4	20%	21.3%	16,784	+1.6
Liberal Democrats	37	9	2	4	-2	18%	23.1%	18,207	+4.3
Independent	19	8	2	7	-5	16%	9.1%	7,164	-7.7
Green	11	7	4	0	+4	14%	9.4%	7,393	+5.5
Portishead Ind.	4	3	0	1	-1	6%	4.4%	3,462	-2.9

Following the 2023 election the council remained under no overall control, with the Conservatives the largest group. On 12 May 2023, it was announced there would be a partnership between the Liberal Democrats (sitting as a group with three independents), Labour, the Green Party, the Portishead Independents and two other independents (sitting as their own group). Mike Bell, leader of the Liberal Democrat group was announced as the new leader of the council, with Labour councillor Catherine Gibbons being deputy leader, with these positions to be confirmed at the annual council meeting on 23 May 2023.

== Ward results ==
The ward results listed below are based on the changes from the 2019 elections, not taking into account any party defections or by-elections. Incumbent councillors are marked with an asterisk (*).

=== Backwell ===
Backwell
Party	Candidate	Votes	%	±%
Green	Bridget Petty*	1,144	64.3	+0.8
Conservative	Gillian Boylan	434	24.4	−8.0
Independent	Sarah Ould	200	11.2	N/A
Majority		710	38.9	
Turnout		1,783	48.19	−0.69
Registered electors		3,700		
Green hold		Swing		

=== Banwell & Winscombe ===
Banwell & Winscombe (2 seats)
Party	Candidate	Votes	%	±%
Green	Tom Nicholson	1,019	42.4	−3.9
Green	Joe Tristram	934	38.9	N/A
Conservative	Ann Harley*	810	33.7	−17.3
Conservative	Martin Newman	750	31.2	−6.7
Liberal Democrats	Steve Voller	470	19.6	N/A
Liberal Democrats	Geraldine Buck	469	19.5	N/A
Labour	Charles Williams	177	7.4	−13.2
Labour	Robert Skeen	177	7.4	−10.9
Turnout		2,483	36.43	−0.61
Registered electors		6,815		
Green gain from Conservative		Swing		
Green hold		Swing		

=== Blagdon & Churchill ===
Blagdon & Churchill
Party	Candidate	Votes	%	±%
Liberal Democrats	Patrick Keating*	741	59.1	+3.2
Conservative	Carl Francis-Pester	279	22.3	−12.4
Labour Co-op	Simon Crew	233	18.6	+9.3
Majority		462	36.9	N/A
Turnout		1,276	37.82	−0.25
Registered electors				
Liberal Democrats hold		Swing	+7.8	

=== Clevedon East ===
Clevedon East
Party	Candidate	Votes	%	±%
Independent	David Shopland*	360	30.6	−12.5
Conservative	Dan Barks	335	28.5	+15.4
Labour	Adele Gardner	305	25.9	+9.3
Liberal Democrats	Jude Chambers	177	15.0	−12.2
Majority		25	2.1	−13.8
Turnout		1,188	34.20	+1.32
Registered electors		3,474		
Independent hold		Swing	-14.0	

=== Clevedon South ===
Clevedon South
Party	Candidate	Votes	%	±%
Labour	Hannah Young	590	54.4	N/A
Conservative	Harry Blades	494	45.6	+18.0
Majority		96	8.8	
Turnout		1,091	32.97	+3.80
Registered electors		3,309		
Labour gain from Independent		Swing	N/A	

=== Clevedon Walton ===
Clevedon Walton
Party	Candidate	Votes	%	±%
Conservative	Michael Pryke	580	34.4	−5.9
Independent	Cathy Hawkins	439	26.0	N/A
Liberal Democrats	Simon Holmes	390	23.1	−26.7
Labour	Nichola Barton	279	16.5	+6.6
Majority		141		
Turnout		1,691	47.81	+8.23
Registered electors		3,537		
Conservative gain from Liberal Democrats		Swing	+10.4	

=== Clevedon West ===
Clevedon West
Party	Candidate	Votes	%	±%
Conservative	Luke Smith	540	39.7	−2.1
Liberal Democrats	Geoffrey Richardson*	339	24.9	−33.3
Labour	Kevin O'Brien	246	18.1	N/A
Independent	Andy Neads	234	17.2	N/A
Majority		201		
Turnout		1,365	42.63	+8.38
Registered electors		3,202		
Conservative gain from Liberal Democrats		Swing	+15.6	

=== Clevedon Yeo ===
Clevedon Yeo
Party	Candidate	Votes	%	±%
Conservative	Christopher Blades	530	44.4	−4.3
Labour	Richard Westwood*	448	37.6	−13.7
Independent	Trevor Morgan	215	18.0	N/A
Majority		82		
Turnout		1,194	36.02	+7.43
Registered electors		3,315		
Conservative gain from Labour		Swing		

=== Congresbury & Puxton ===
Congresbury & Puxton
Party	Candidate	Votes	%	±%
Green	Dan Thomas	831	60.0	N/A
Liberal Democrats	David Hayes	232	16.7	−37.6
Conservative	Colin Knott	232	16.7	+3.1
Labour	Paul Doolan	91	6.6	−25.4
Majority		599		
Turnout		1,397	42.77	+3.45
Registered electors		3,266		
Green gain from Liberal Democrats		Swing		

- Change is from 2019 election, seat gained by the Green Party at a by-election in 2021

=== Gordano Valley ===
Gordano Valley
Party	Candidate	Votes	%	±%
Conservative	Nigel Ashton*	840	58.3	+9.2
Liberal Democrats	Bernadette Morgan	660	41.7	+2.9
Majority		180	16.6	
Turnout		1,507	42.59	+1.25
Registered electors		3,538		
Conservative hold		Swing		

=== Hutton & Locking ===
Hutton & Locking (2 seats)
Party	Candidate	Votes	%	±%
Conservative	Terry Porter*	834	56.3	+10.2
Independent	Mike Solomon*	628	42.4	−9.7
Liberal Democrats	Georgina Barry	449	30.3	N/A
Labour	Tim Taylor	375	25.3	+6.6
Labour	Lucas Wheatley	346	23.4	+6.2
Independent	Elfan Ap Rees	329	22.2	N/A
Turnout		1,764	27.80	−6.65
Registered electors		6,345		
Conservative hold		Swing		
Independent hold		Swing		

=== Long Ashton ===
Long Ashton (2 seats)
Party	Candidate	Votes	%	±%
Liberal Democrats	Ashley Cartman*	1,642	57.4	+11.8
Green	Stuart McQuillan*	1,455	50.9	+11.3
Conservative	Charles Cave	1,184	41.4	+2.6
Conservative	David Oyns	967	33.8	−2.5
Labour	William Hall	470	16.4	+2.7
Turnout		3,037	44.03	+2.81
Registered electors		6,898		
Liberal Democrats hold		Swing		
Green hold		Swing		

=== Nailsea Golden Valley ===
Nailsea Golden Valley
Party	Candidate	Votes	%	±%
Independent	Andy Cole	1,027	75.3	−3.2
Labour	Ian Ridge	179	13.1	+6.5
Conservative	Anita Heappey	158	11.6	−3.3
Majority		848	62.2	
Turnout		1,368	41.52	−5.32
Registered electors		3,295		
Independent hold		Swing		

=== Nailsea West End ===
Nailsea West End
Party	Candidate	Votes	%	±%
Conservative	Ollie Ellis	631	54.2	+32.1
Independent	James Tonkin*	317	27.2	−50.7
Labour	Derek Cottrell	232	18.6	N/A
Majority				
Turnout		1,184	38.63	+1.36
Registered electors		3,065		
Conservative gain from Independent		Swing		

=== Nailsea Yeo ===
Nailsea Yeo
Party	Candidate	Votes	%	±%
Independent	Mike Bird*	592	55.0	−4.5
Conservative	Lesley Cottrell	268	24.9	+0.6
Labour	Peter Harris	216	20.1	+10.0
Majority				
Turnout		1,083	31.31	−2.17
Registered electors		3,459		
Independent hold		Swing		

=== Nailsea Youngwood ===
Nailsea Youngwood
Party	Candidate	Votes	%	±%
Labour	Clare Hunt	570	51.7	+40.5
Conservative	Jeremy Blatchford	532	48.3	+11.9
Majority				
Turnout		1,109	39.10	−0.86
Registered electors		2,836		
Labour gain from Independent		Swing		

=== Pill ===
Pill
Party	Candidate	Votes	%	±%
Green	Jenna Ho Marris	624	48.6	N/A
Conservative	Jeff Stott-Everett	435	33.9	+24.8
Labour	Daniel Hackwood	143	11.1	N/A
Liberal Democrats	Huw James	82	6.4	N/A
Majority				
Turnout		1,292	37.31	−5.31
Registered electors		3,463		
Green gain from Independent		Swing		

- Huw James represented Portishead South from 2019 to 2023

=== Portishead East ===
Portishead East (2 seats)
Party	Candidate	Votes	%	±%
Portishead Ind.	Roger Whitfield	1,114	76.6	+5.1
Independent	Caritas Charles*	721	49.6	N/A
Conservative	Hazel Richards	376	25.9	+8.5
Conservative	Matt Westley	286	19.7	+4.2
Liberal Democrats	Erika Stride	264	16.9	N/A
Liberal Democrats	Janey Little	246	11.3	N/A
Turnout		1,608	28.32	−7.64
Registered electors		5,677		
Portishead Ind. hold		Swing		
Independent gain from Portishead Ind.		Swing		

=== Portishead North ===
Portishead North
Party	Candidate	Votes	%	±%
Portishead Ind.	Tim Snaden*	723	49.7	−18.5
Conservative	Reyna Knight	396	27.2	+5.0
Liberal Democrats	Francoise Rimelin Johnston	337	23.1	N/A
Majority			22.5	−23.6
Turnout		1,467	37.87	−7.89
Registered electors		3,874		
Portishead Ind. hold		Swing		

=== Portishead South ===
Portishead South
Party	Candidate	Votes	%	±%
Conservative	Peter Burden	447	33.8	−7.4
Liberal Democrats	Yue He Parkinson	358	27.1	−14.3
Portishead Ind.	Paddy Sterndale	335	25.3	N/A
Labour	Steven Lister	183	13.8	−3.6
Majority		89	6.7	+6.5
Turnout		1,334	40.58	−5.19
Registered electors		3,287		
Conservative gain from Liberal Democrats		Swing	+6.9	

=== Portishead West ===
Portishead West (2 seats)
Party	Candidate	Votes	%	±%
Portishead Ind.	Nicola Holland*	1,290	56.5	−11.7
Liberal Democrats	Sue Mason	1,091	47.8	+20.7
Conservative	Felicity Baker	905	39.6	+20.3
Conservative	David Pasley	708	31.0	+16.0
Labour	Chris Bird	571	25.0	+18.6
Turnout		2,619	36.41	−8.66
Registered electors		7,193		
Portishead Ind. hold		Swing		
Liberal Democrats gain from Independent		Swing		

=== Weston-super-Mare Central ===
Weston-super-Mare Central (2 seats)
Party	Candidate	Votes	%	±%
Liberal Democrats	Mike Bell*	848	59.4	+2.5
Liberal Democrats	Robert Payne*	686	44.5	+0.1
Labour	Valerie Donegan	361	25.3	+1.2
Conservative	Clive Webb	331	23.2	−3.5
Conservative	Jordan Heath	326	22.8	+3.1
Labour	Andrew Rogers	267	18.7	+1.2
Independent	Dave Morgan	88	6.2	N/A
Turnout		1,541	22.89	−6.33
Registered electors		6,731		
Liberal Democrats hold		Swing		
Liberal Democrats hold		Swing		

=== Weston-super-Mare Hillside ===
Weston-super-Mare Hillside (2 seats)
Party	Candidate	Votes	%	±%
Liberal Democrats	Mark Canniford*	1,187	73.0	+5.5
Liberal Democrats	John Crockford-Hawley*	1,096	66.9	+3.3
Labour	Dorothy Agassiz	279	17.0	+4.0
Conservative	Caroline Lucas	266	16.2	+1.3
Labour	Bill McCoid	247	15.1	+3.4
Conservative	Justnya Pecak-Michalowicz	193	11.8	+0.3
Turnout		1,727	25.80	−8.29
Registered electors		6,694		
Liberal Democrats hold		Swing		
Liberal Democrats hold		Swing		

=== Weston-super-Mare Kewstoke ===
Weston-super-Mare Kewstoke (2 seats)
Party	Candidate	Votes	%	±%
Conservative	Lisa Pilgrim*	860	43.2	−1.7
Conservative	Martin Williams	795	39.9	−4.0
Liberal Democrats	Joe Bambridge	768	38.6	+11.5
Liberal Democrats	Clare Morris	734	36.9	N/A
Labour	Alan Hill	455	22.9	+0.7
Labour	Jack Wilfan	369	18.5	−1.2
Turnout		2,094	30.65	−3.31
Registered electors		6,831		
Conservative hold		Swing		
Conservative hold		Swing		

=== Weston-super-Mare Mid Worle ===
Weston-super-Mare Mid Worle
Party	Candidate	Votes	%	±%
Liberal Democrats	Jemma Coles	338	37.3	+8.6
Labour	Alan Peak	299	33.0	+6.0
Conservative	James Davis	269	29.7	−3.4
Majority				
Turnout		913	28.21	−2.73
Registered electors		3,237		
Liberal Democrats gain from Conservative		Swing		

=== Weston-super-Mare Milton ===
Weston-super-Mare Milton (2 seats)
Party	Candidate	Votes	%	±%
Labour	Richard Tucker*	1,123	61.0	+10.9
Labour	Catherine Gibbons*	1,013	55.0	+12.4
Conservative	Brenda Charles	549	29.8	−1.4
Conservative	Mary Blatchford	508	27.6	+4.1
Liberal Democrats	Chantelle Canniford	279	15.1	−1.7
Liberal Democrats	Glyn Hayes	212	11.5	N/A
Turnout		1,957	27.73	−3.32
Registered electors		7,058		
Labour hold		Swing		
Labour hold		Swing		

=== Weston-super-Mare North Worle ===
Weston-super-Mare North Worle (2 seats)
Party	Candidate	Votes	%	±%
Conservative	Marc Aplin*	806	53.9	+5.7
Conservative	Marcia Pepperall*	627	41.9	+3.7
Labour	Matthew Flint	413	27.6	−0.5
Liberal Democrats	Richard Skinner	404	27.0	−2.6
Labour	Lisa Youlton	378	25.3	+5.1
Liberal Democrats	Ron Moon	362	24.2	−1.9
Turnout		1,588	25.86	−2.64
Registered electors		6,141		
Conservative hold		Swing		
Conservative hold		Swing		

=== Weston-super-Mare South ===
Weston-super-Mare South (2 seats)
Party	Candidate	Votes	%	±%
Labour	James Clayton*	727	72.8	+0.3
Labour	Ian Parker*	660	66.1	−8.4
Conservative	Valerie MacQueen	164	16.4	−12.0
Conservative	Don Cameron	151	15.1	−8.4
Liberal Democrats	Ray Armstrong	150	15.0	N/A
Liberal Democrats	Joan Dunne	146	14.6	N/A
Turnout		1,085	17.54	−17.86
Registered electors		6,186		
Labour hold		Swing		
Labour hold		Swing		

=== Weston-super-Mare South Worle ===
Weston-super-Mare South Worle (2 seats)
Party	Candidate	Votes	%	±%
Labour	Hugh Malyan	619	40.8	+4.8
Conservative	Peter Crew*	611	40.3	−6.0
Labour	James Willis-Boden	583	38.4	+3.8
Conservative	Michal Kus	529	34.8	−6.6
Liberal Democrats	Gully Hayer	371	24.4	+1.0
Liberal Democrats	Hugh Eckett	323	21.3	N/A
Turnout		1,617	23.94	−7.33
Registered electors		6,755		
Labour gain from Conservative		Swing		
Conservative hold		Swing		

=== Weston-super-Mare Uphill ===
Weston-super-Mare Uphill (2 seats)
Party	Candidate	Votes	%	±%
Labour	Helen Thornton	680	34.7	+14.8
Conservative	Peter Bryant*	643	32.8	+6.6
Conservative	Gillian Bute	612	31.2	+10.1
Labour	Crispin Taylor	575	29.3	+12.3
Liberal Democrats	Tony Hobden	403	24.4	+5.8
Liberal Democrats	Kelly Jewell	369	21.3	N/A
Independent	Martyn Williams	240	12.2	N/A
Independent	John Ley-Morgan*	229	11.7	−48.5
Green	Peter Waldschmidt	173	8.8	N/A
Turnout		2,054	31.44	−4.31
Registered electors		6,534		
Labour gain from Independent		Swing		
Conservative hold		Swing		

=== Weston-super-Mare Winterstoke ===
Weston-super-Mare Winterstoke (2 seats)
Party	Candidate	Votes	%	±%
Labour	Ciaran Cronnelly*	511	47.1	+2.7
Labour	Annabelle Chard	483	44.5	+1.6
Conservative	Joshua Selby	225	20.7	−35.5
Conservative	Daniel Young	221	20.3	−20.4
Liberal Democrats	Jenny Gosden	191	17.6	N/A
Liberal Democrats	Geoff Mills	175	16.1	N/A
Green	Thomas Daw	145	13.4	N/A
Independent	Dawn Payne	111	10.2	N/A
Independent	Len Purnell	110	10.1	N/A
Turnout		1,132	17.16	−0.60
Registered electors		6,597		
Labour hold		Swing		
Labour hold		Swing		

=== Wick St Lawrence & St Georges ===
Wick St Lawrence & St Georges
Party	Candidate	Votes	%	±%
Independent	Stuart Davies	380	41.5	N/A
Conservative	Samantha Pepperall	215	23.5	−36.9
Labour	Paul Fuller	174	19.0	−20.6
Liberal Democrats	Estelle Canniford	146	16.0	N/A
Majority				
Turnout		917	25.79	+3.76
Registered electors		3,555		
Independent gain from Conservative		Swing		

=== Winford ===
Winford
Party	Candidate	Votes	%	±%
Green	Annemieke Waite	663	58.6	N/A
Conservative	Vivien Etheridge	469	41.4	−15.7
Majority				
Turnout		1,134	32.40	+0.65
Registered electors		3,500		
Green gain from Independent		Swing		

=== Wrington ===
Wrington
Party	Candidate	Votes	%	±%
Independent	Stephen Hogg*	944	77.9	−0.5
Conservative	John Wood	268	22.1	+7.5
Majority				
Turnout		1,220	36.35	−9.71
Registered electors		3,356		
Independent hold		Swing		

=== Yatton ===
Yatton (2 seats)
Party	Candidate	Votes	%	±%
Independent	Steve Bridger*	1,339	49.2	−18.4
Liberal Democrats	Wendy Griggs*	1,212	44.5	−3.0
Conservative	Annabel Tall	1,161	42.6	+20.3
Conservative	James MacQueen	936	34.4	+18.5
Labour	Kay Tabernacle	480	17.6	+8.9
Labour	Ciro La Motta	319	11.7	+5.9
Turnout		2,963	41.19	−0.28
Registered electors		7,193		
Independent hold		Swing		
Liberal Democrats hold		Swing		

== Changes 2023–2027 ==
Ashley Cartman, elected as a Liberal Democrat, left the party to sit as an independent in January 2025.

Stuart Davies, who had been elected as an independent, joined Reform UK in February 2025.

=== Wrington by-election ===
Wrington: 16 November 2023
Party	Candidate	Votes	%	±%
Green	Thomas Daw	336	32.7	N/A
Conservative	Annabell Tall	297	28.9	+6.8
Liberal Democrats	Samantha Louden-Cooke	283	27.5	N/A
Labour	Steven Lister	112	10.9	N/A
Majority		39	3.8	
Turnout		1,028		
Green gain from Independent				

=== Long Ashton by-election ===
Long Ashton by-election: 13 November 2025
Party	Candidate	Votes	%	±%
Green	Mike Dunn	1,254	55.7	+25.1
Conservative	James Gillham	399	17.7	–7.2
Reform	James Read	349	15.5	N/A
Liberal Democrats	Francoise Johnston	129	5.7	–28.9
Labour	Ian Ridge	121	5.4	–4.5
Majority		855	38.0	N/A
Turnout		2,252	32.6	–11.4
Registered electors		~6,908		
Green hold		Swing	▲16.2	

=== Clevedon South by-election ===
This by-election was triggered by the resignation of Councillor Hannah Young (Labour). She stepped down in late 2025.

Clevedon South by-election: 5th February 2026
Party	Candidate	Votes	%	±%
Labour	Michael Harriott	350	29.0	▼25.4
Reform	Louise Brandon	334	27.7	N/A
Conservative	Harry Blades	224	18.6	▼27.0
Green	Dave Skinner	197	16.3	N/A
Liberal Democrats	Jude Chambers	100	8.3	N/A
Majority		16	1.3	N/A
Turnout		1,205	36.4	▲3.4
Registered electors		3,323		
Labour hold		Swing	N/A	

=== Hutton & Locking by-election ===
Hutton & Locking by-election: 10th September 2026
Party	Candidate	Votes	%	±%
Reform	William Jones	706	38.5	N/A
Liberal Democrats	Georgina Barry	612	33.3	+16.2
Conservative	John Standfield	281	15.3	−16.6
Labour	Yue He Parkinson	133	7.2	−7.1
Green	James Wilis-Boden	104	5.7	N/A
Majority		94	5.2	N/A
Turnout		1838	26.3	−1.5
Reform gain from Conservative		Swing		
