= 2015 North Somerset Council election =

2015 UK local government election

- 2 May 2015

All 50 seats to North Somerset Council 26 seats needed for a majority
	First party	Second party	Third party
	Con	Ind	LD
Party	Conservative	Independent	Liberal Democrats
Last election	42 seats, 44.4%	7 seats, 13.7%	6 seats, 18.7%
Seats won	36	5	4
Seat change	▼6	▼2	▼2
Popular vote	68,171	13,941	24,319
Percentage	44.0%	9.0%	15.7%
Swing	▼0.4%	▼4.7%	▼3.1%
	Fourth party	Fifth party
	Lab	Grn
Party	Labour	Green
Last election	5 seats, 20.3%	1 seat, 1.6%
Seats won	3	1
Seat change	▼2	-
Popular vote	27,417	5,111
Percentage	17.7%	3.3%
Swing	▼2.6%	▲0.6%
- Map of the results of the 2015 North Somerset council election. Conservatives in blue, independent in grey, Liberal Democrats in yellow, Labour in red and Green Party in green.
Council control before election
Conservative
Council control after election
Conservative

North Somerset unitary council is elected every four years, with fifty councillors to be elected. Since the first election to the unitary authority in 1995, the council has either been under Conservative party control, or no party has held a majority. The Conservatives gained a majority at the 2007 election and have retained control since then. At the 2015 election, the outcome was as follows:

Party	Councillors
Conservatives	36
Independents	6
Liberal Democrats	4
Labour	3
Greens	1

== Ward results ==
An asterisk * indicates an incumbent seeking re-election.

=== Backwell ===
Backwell
Party	Candidate	Votes	%	±%
Conservative	Karen Barclay*	1,873	68.0	
Liberal Democrats	Alison Crawford	880	32.0	
Majority		993	36.03	
Turnout		2753	75.67	+24.17
Conservative gain from Independent		Swing		

In the 2011 election Karen Barclay won the seat as an independent but switched to Conservative

=== Banwell & Winscombe ===
Banwell & Winscombe (2)
Party	Candidate	Votes	%	±%
Conservative	Ann Harley*	2,063	46.9	
Conservative	Jerry O'Brien	1,616	36.7	
North Somerset First Independents	Steven Bridges	773	17.6	
Green	Catherine Parmenter	772	17.5	
North Somerset First Independents	Paul Bateman	706	16.0	
Liberal Democrats	Judith Hayes	651	14.8	
Labour	Timothy Powell	485	11.0	
Labour	Christy Cooney	434	9.9	
Majority				
Turnout			72.14	
Conservative hold		Swing		
Conservative hold		Swing		

=== Blagdon & Churchill ===
Blagdon & Churchill
Party	Candidate	Votes	%	±%
Conservative	Elizabeth Wells*	1,439	60.5	
Green	Laurence Carruthers	585	24.6	
Labour	Thomas Watson-Follett	356	15.0	
Majority				
Turnout			75.2	
Conservative hold		Swing		

=== Clevedon East ===
Clevedon East
Party	Candidate	Votes	%	±%
Independent	David Shopland*	812	36.2	
Conservative	Jon Middleton	717	32.0	
Labour	Kevin O'Brien	378	16.8	
Liberal Democrats	Caroline Cherry	337	15.0	
Majority				
Turnout			65.9	
Independent hold		Swing		

=== Clevedon South ===
Clevedon South
Party	Candidate	Votes	%	±%
Conservative	Robert Garner*	1,231	54.8	
Labour	Nicola Barton	623	27.8	
Liberal Democrats	Angela Neale	391	17.4	
Majority				
Turnout			64.95	+24.45
Conservative hold		Swing		

=== Clevedon Walton ===
Clevedon Walton
Party	Candidate	Votes	%	±%
Conservative	Colin Hall*	1,414	53.1	
Independent	Graham Watkins	840	31.5	
Labour	Ivy Cameron	409	15.4	
Majority				
Turnout			75.24	+14.44
Conservative hold		Swing		

=== Clevedon West ===
Clevedon West
Party	Candidate	Votes	%	±%
Conservative	Christopher Blades*	1,078	47.9	
Independent	Jane Geldart	612	27.2	
Labour	Stuart Hale	559	24.9	
Majority				
Turnout			68.66	+19.36
Conservative hold		Swing		

=== Clevedon Yeo ===
Clevedon Yeo
Party	Candidate	Votes	%	±%
Conservative	Erica Blades	1,338	58.0	
Labour	Michael Harriot	551	23.9	
Liberal Democrats	Bronno Van Der Holt	418	18.1	
Majority				
Turnout			68.87	+28.67
Conservative hold		Swing		

=== Congresbury ===
Congresbury
Party	Candidate	Votes	%	±%
Green	Thomas Leimdorfer*	1,269	55.7	
Conservative	Samantha Pepperall	787	34.5	
Labour	Paul Doolan	222	9.7	
Majority				
Turnout			71.92	+20.22
Green hold		Swing		

=== Gordano Valley ===
Gordano Valley
Party	Candidate	Votes	%	±%
Conservative	Nigel Ashton*	1,426	52.3	
UKIP	David Withers	350	12.8	
Independent	Carl Francis-Pester*	343	12.6	
Labour	Katherine Everitt	338	12.4	
Liberal Democrats	David Neale	270	9.9	
Majority				
Turnout			77.08	+27.08
Conservative hold		Swing		

=== Hutton and Locking ===
Hutton & Locking (2)
Party	Candidate	Votes	%	±%
Conservative	Terence Porter*	2,127	52.9	
Conservative	Elfan Ap Rees*	1,583	39.4	
North Somerset First Independents	Michael Solomon	1,364	33.9	
Labour	Sarah Clayton	754	18.8	
Labour	Peter Williams	632	15.7	
Turnout			71.06	+24.76
Conservative hold		Swing		
Conservative hold		Swing		

=== Long Ashton ===
Long Ashton (2)
Party	Candidate	Votes	%	±%
Conservative	Charles Cave	2,546	49.8	
Conservative	Catherine Stowey	2,351	46.0	
Labour	David Johnson	1,220	23.9	
Green	Stuart McQuillan	1,216	23.8	
Liberal Democrats	Paul Bramhall	1,148	22.5	
Liberal Democrats	Huw James	246	4.8	
Majority				
Turnout			76.86	+30.96
Conservative hold		Swing		
Conservative hold		Swing		

=== Nailsea Golden Valley ===
Nailsea Golden Valley
Party	Candidate	Votes	%	±%
Independent	Andrew Cole*	1,890	69.3	
Conservative	Jeremy Blatchford*	838	30.7	
Majority				
Turnout			80.06	+20.36
Independent hold		Swing		

=== Nailsea West End ===
Nailsea West End
Party	Candidate	Votes	%	±%
Independent	James Tonkin	1,251	56.8	
Conservative	Teresa Kemp*	951	43.2	
Majority				
Turnout			73.18	
Independent hold		Swing		

=== Nailsea Yeo ===
Nailsea Yeo
Party	Candidate	Votes	%	±%
Conservative	Mary Blatchford*	998	42.0	
Independent	Julie Day	993	41.8	
Labour	Peter Harris	385	16.2	
Majority				
Turnout			70.3	+20.4
Conservative hold		Swing		

=== Nailsea Youngwood ===
Nailsea Youngwood
Party	Candidate	Votes	%	±%
Conservative	Angela Barber	1,169	55.1	
Independent	Sarah Hearne	953	44.9	
Majority				
Turnout			74.34	
Conservative hold		Swing		

=== Pill ===
Pill
Party	Candidate	Votes	%	±%
Independent	Donald Davies*	1,370	56.6	
Conservative	Martyn Stowey	526	21.7	
Independent	Nanette Kirsen	525	21.7	
Majority				
Turnout			69.68	+26.28
Independent hold		Swing		

=== Portishead East ===
Portishead East (2)
Party	Candidate	Votes	%	±%
Conservative	David Oyns	1,665	48.1	
Conservative	David Pasley*	1,589	46.0	
Liberal Democrats	Daisy Bickley	742	21.5	
Labour	Anthony Hill	699	20.2	
Liberal Democrats	Jean Lord	586	16.9	
Independent	Arthur Terry*	530	15.3	
Majority				
Turnout			65.4	+22.8
Conservative hold		Swing		
Conservative hold		Swing		

At the previous election Arthur Terry won the old single member ward of Portishead East for the Conservatives but stood as an independent in 2015. David Pashley was the sitting councillor for the old Portishead Coastal ward.

=== Portishead North ===
Portishead North
Party	Candidate	Votes	%	±%
Conservative	Reyna Knight*	1,399	49.0	
North Somerset First Independents	Roger Whitfield	499	17.5	
Liberal Democrats	Stephen Temple	486	17.0	
Labour	John Farnham	472	16.5	
Majority				
Turnout			72.67	+21.67
Conservative hold		Swing		

=== Portishead South ===
Portishead South
Party	Candidate	Votes	%	±%
Conservative	Peter Burden	1,349	55.9	
Labour	Terry Lester	536	22.2	
Liberal Democrats	Richard Christopherson	527	21.8	
Majority				
Turnout			73.51	+27.51
Conservative hold		Swing		

=== Portishead West ===
Portishead West
Party	Candidate	Votes	%	±%
Conservative	Felicity Baker*	2,426	45.9	
Conservative	David Jolley*	2,212	41.9	
Liberal Democrats	Susan Mason	1,204	22.8	
Labour	Paul Dunn	921	17.4	
Liberal Democrats	Clive Hall	888	16.8	
North Somerset First Independents	Beverley Langdale	871	16.5	
North Somerset First Independents	Geoffrey Hardman	711	13.5	
Majority				
Turnout			73.57	+24.47
Conservative hold		Swing		
Conservative hold		Swing		

=== Weston-super-Mare Bournville ===
Weston-super-Mare Bournville (2)
Party	Candidate	Votes	%	±%
Labour	James Clayton	1,415	44.6	
Labour	Ian Parker*	1,392	43.9	
Conservative	Michal Kus	592	18.7	
Conservative	Stephen Williams	585	18.4	
North Somerset First Independents	Roseana Warwick	478	15.1	
North Somerset First Independents	Gillian Ashworth	425	13.4	
Liberal Democrats	June How	348	11.0	
Liberal Democrats	Elliot Stephen	347	10.9	
Turnout			51.51	+21.61
Labour hold		Swing		
Labour hold		Swing		

=== Weston-Super-Mare Central ===
Weston-super-Mare Central (2)
Party	Candidate	Votes	%	±%
Liberal Democrats	Mike Bell*	1,292	41.1	
Conservative	Richard Nightingale	1,133	36.0	
Liberal Democrats	Robert Payne*	977	31.1	
Conservative	Susan Creasey	947	30.1	
Labour	Richard Holcombe	651	20.7	
Labour	Neil Norton	642	20.4	
Turnout			52.15	+14.65
Liberal Democrats hold		Swing		
Conservative gain from Liberal Democrats		Swing		

Robert Payne was elected as a councillor for the old Weston-Super-Mare West at the 2011 election.

=== Weston-Super-Mare Hillside ===
Weston-super-Mare Hillside (2)
Party	Candidate	Votes	%	±%
Liberal Democrats	Mark Canniford*	1,875	47.6	
Liberal Democrats	John Crockford-Hawley*	1,841	46.8	
Conservative	Andrew Horler	839	21.3	
Conservative	Stephen Anderson	800	20.3	
UKIP	Andrew Gray	654	16.6	
Labour	David Drinkwater	476	12.1	
Labour	Dorothy Agassiz	442	11.2	
Green	Peter Waldschmidt	340	8.6	
Turnout			59.95	+16.85
Liberal Democrats hold		Swing		
Liberal Democrats hold		Swing		

=== Weston-Super-Mare Kewstoke ===
Weston-super-Mare Kewstoke (2)
Party	Candidate	Votes	%	±%
Conservative	Lisa Pilgrim*	2,304	48.0	
Conservative	Rosslyn Willis*	2,029	42.3	
UKIP	Stuart Davies	1,149	23.9	
Liberal Democrats	Hugh Eckett	796	16.6	
Labour	Stephanie Baber	790	16.5	
Labour	Annabelle Chard	776	16.2	
Liberal Democrats	John Harrison	669	13.9	
Turnout			47.5	+24.07
Conservative hold		Swing		
Conservative hold		Swing		

=== Weston-Super-Mare Mid Worle ===
Weston-super-Mare Mid Worle
Party	Candidate	Votes	%	±%
Conservative	Robert Cleland*	627	31.7	
Labour	Simon Stokes	519	26.2	
UKIP	Anita Spencer-Johns	516	26.0	
Liberal Democrats	David Cordingley	184	9.3	
North Somerset First Independents	Michael Kellaway-Marriott	135	6.8	
Turnout			63.61	+25.51
Conservative hold		Swing		

=== Weston-Super-Mare Milton ===
Weston-super-Mare Milton (2)
Party	Candidate	Votes	%	±%
Labour	Richard Tucker*	1,419	31.5	
Conservative	Martin Williams	1,279	28.4	
Conservative	Ian Porter	1,262	28.0	
Labour	Michael Lyall	1,194	26.5	
UKIP	Stewart Ogborne	737	16.3	
North Somerset First Independents	John Christopher	529	11.7	
Liberal Democrats	Jennifer Gosden	441	9.8	
Liberal Democrats	Joan Dunne	391	8.7	
North Somerset First Independents	James Willis-Boden	385	8.5	
Turnout			66.81	+31.51
Labour hold		Swing		
Conservative hold		Swing		

=== Weston-Super-Mare North Worle ===
Weston-super-Mare North Worle (2)
Party	Candidate	Votes	%	±%
Conservative	Marcia Pepperall	1,506	36.1	
North Somerset First Independents	Derek Mead	1,229	29.4	
Conservative	David Poole	1,165	27.9	
Labour	Denise Hunt	772	18.5	
Labour	John Carson	750	18.0	
Liberal Democrats	Ronald Moon	641	15.3	
Turnout			67.33	+29.13
Conservative hold		Swing		
North Somerset First Independents gain from Conservative		Swing		

=== Weston-Super-Mare South Worle ===
Weston-super-Mare South Worle (2)
Party	Candidate	Votes	%	±%
Conservative	Peter Crew*	1,721	43.2	
Conservative	David Hitchins*	1,591	39.9	
Labour	Angela Bolitho	1,014	25.4	
Labour	Alan Peak	937	23.5	
North Somerset First Independents	Anita Smith	689	17.3	
Liberal Democrats	Christopher Kingsbury	686	17.2	
North Somerset First Independents	Julian Norris	624	15.7	
Turnout			62.77	+24.67
Conservative hold		Swing		
Conservative hold		Swing		

=== Weston-super-Mare Uphill ===
Weston-super-Mare Uphill (2)
Party	Candidate	Votes	%	±%
Conservative	Anthony Bryant*	1,308	29.7	
Independent	John Ley-Morgan	1,114	25.3	
UKIP	Keith Morris	984	22.3	
Conservative	Clive Webb*	797	18.1	
North Somerset First Independents	Kenneth Perrett	704	16.0	
Labour	Ann Kesteven	677	15.4	
Labour	Carole Bressington	654	14.9	
Liberal Democrats	Tina Roberts	512	11.6	
Liberal Democrats	Jason Green	505	11.5	
Turnout			67.84	+22.14
Conservative hold		Swing		
Independent gain from Conservative		Swing		

=== Weston-Super-Mare Winterstoke ===
Weston-super-Mare Winterstoke (2)
Party	Candidate	Votes	%	±%
Conservative	Sarah Codling	1,093	41.7	
Conservative	Dawn Payne*	880	33.6	
UKIP	Christopher Childs	690	26.3	
Labour	Catherine Gibbons-Antonopoulos	631	24.1	
Labour	Alan Baber	585	22.3	
Liberal Democrats	Andrew Exon	310	11.8	
Liberal Democrats	Glyn Hayes	230	8.8	
North Somerset First Independents	Cyril King	226	8.6	
Turnout			53.26	+17.96
Conservative hold		Swing		
Conservative hold		Swing		

=== Wick St Lawrence and St Georges ===
Wick St Lawrence and St Georges
Party	Candidate	Votes	%	±%
Conservative	Ruth Jacobs	1,033	45.8	
North Somerset First Independents	Ian Rowland	529	23.5	
Labour	Jacqueline Scholes	433	19.2	
Liberal Democrats	Jeffrey Alen	260	11.5	
Majority				
Turnout			64.42	
Conservative hold		Swing		

=== Winford ===
Winford
Party	Candidate	Votes	%	±%
Conservative	Nicolas Wilton	1,303	52.9	
Independent	Hugh Gregor*	1,160	47.1	
Majority		143		
Turnout			73.54	+28.24
Conservative gain from Independent		Swing		

=== Wrington ===
Wrington
Party	Candidate	Votes	%	±%
Liberal Democrats	Deborah Yamanaka*	1,168	46.1	
Conservative	Annabel Tall*	1,119	44.2	
Labour	Patrick Cooney	246	9.7	
Majority		49		
Turnout			77.93	+20.53
Liberal Democrats hold		Swing		

Annabel Tall had been elected as a Conservative councillor for the Yatton ward in the 2011 election.

=== Yatton ===
Yatton (2)
Party	Candidate	Votes	%	±%
Conservative	Jill Iles*	1,789	36.5	
Conservative	Judith Hadley	1,578	32.2	
Independent	Neil Petersen	1,442	29.4	
Liberal Democrats	Wendy Griggs	1,289	26.3	
Green	Massimo Morelli	917	18.7	
Liberal Democrats	Jonathan Edwards	764	15.6	
Labour	Richard Westwood	553	11.3	
Labour	Hedley Woods	352	7.2	
Turnout			74.97	+24.17
Conservative hold		Swing		
Conservative gain from Independent		Swing		
