= 1999 North Somerset Council election =

1999 UK local government election

Map of the results of the 1999 North Somerset council election. Conservatives in blue, Liberal Democrats in yellow, Labour in red, independent in grey, Green Party in green and Liberal Paty in orange.

The 1999 North Somerset Council election took place on 6 May 1999 to elect members of North Somerset Unitary Council in Somerset, England. The whole council was up for election with boundary changes since the last election in 1995 increasing the number of seats by 2. The Conservative Party gained overall control of the council from no overall control.

== Election result ==
North Somerset local election result 1999
Party	Seats	Gains	Losses	Net gain/loss	Seats %	Votes %	Votes	+/−
Conservative	32			+15	52.5			
Labour	13			+8	21.3			
Liberal Democrats	11			-18	18.0			
Independent	3			+2	4.9			
Green	1			0	1.6			
Liberal	1			0	1.6			
Others	0			-5	0			
