= 2007 North Somerset Council election =

2007 UK local government election

Map of the results of the 2007 North Somerset council election. Conservatives in blue, independent in grey, Liberal Democrats in yellow, Labour in red and Green Party in green. The delayed election in North Worle is shown in dark grey.

The 2007 North Somerset Council election took place on 3 May 2007 to elect members of North Somerset Unitary Council in Somerset, England. The whole council was up for election and the Conservative Party gained overall control of the council from no overall control.

== Background ==
Since the 2003 election the council was controlled by a coalition between the Liberal Democrat and Labour parties. Many of the swing wards on the council were in Weston-super-Mare, with a major issue in the town being the derelict Tropicana lido. The high number of pensioners in the town and lack of things for young people to do in the new estates were also factors in the area.

== Election results ==
The results saw the Conservatives win a majority with 43 of the 61 seats contested. Both the Liberal Democrat and Labour parties suffered heavy losses, with the defeated councillors including Liberal Democrat Isabel Cummings in Yatton after 15 years on the council and the Labour couple Derek and Muriel Kraft.

The election in Weston-super-Mare North Worle ward was delayed after the death of the Liberal Democrat leader of the council Alan Hockridge, meaning it was not held at the same time as the other seats. The postponed election in North Worle as held on 7 June and all 3 seats were won by the Conservatives taking the party to 46 seats.

North Somerset local election result 2007
Party	Seats	Gains	Losses	Net gain/loss	Seats %	Votes %	Votes	+/−
Conservative	43	21	3	+18	74.1	48.2	53,173	+10.6
Independent	6	4	1	+3	10.3	6.9	7,594	+3.2
Liberal Democrats	5	0	15	-15	8.6	29.2	32,243	-8.8
Labour	3	0	6	-6	5.2	13.5	14,859	-6.5
Green	1	0	0	0	1.7	1.6	1,739	+1.0
UKIP	0	0	0	0	0.0	0.7	735	+0.6

== Ward results ==
Backwell (2)
Party	Candidate	Votes	%	±%
Independent	Tom Collinson	1,283		
Independent	Karen Barclay	912		
Conservative	Peter Burden	593		
Conservative	Roger Theis	523		
Liberal Democrats	David Neale	295		
Turnout		3,606	45.1	
Independent gain from Conservative		Swing		
Independent gain from Conservative		Swing		

Banwell & Winscombe (3)
Party	Candidate	Votes	%	±%
Conservative	Ann Harley	2,020		
Conservative	Tony Lake	1,966		
Conservative	Tim Marter	1,830		
Liberal Democrats	Amanda Brading	804		
Liberal Democrats	Mark Lewis	583		
Liberal Democrats	Raymond Armstrong	575		
Labour	Ludovic Janas	274		
Labour	Tony Roberts	264		
Labour	Andrew Hughes	258		
Turnout		8,574	37.8	
Conservative hold		Swing		
Conservative hold		Swing		
Conservative hold		Swing		

Blagdon & Churchill
Party	Candidate	Votes	%	±%
Conservative	Liz Wells	882	65.1	+7.3
Liberal Democrats	Anthony Hughes	379	28.0	−5.4
Labour	Stanley Banks	93	6.9	−1.9
Majority		503	37.1	+12.7
Turnout		1,354	44.6	
Conservative hold		Swing		

Clevedon Central
Party	Candidate	Votes	%	±%
Conservative	Stanley Vyce	357	45.1	+15.3
Liberal Democrats	John Vanderplank	245	31.0	+11.9
Labour	Paul Sterling	189	23.9	−27.2
Majority		112	14.2	
Turnout		791	33.5	
Conservative gain from Labour		Swing		

Clevedon East
Party	Candidate	Votes	%	±%
Independent	David Shopland	557	60.4	+12.7
Conservative	Jon Middleton	231	25.1	+0.8
Labour	Joe Norman	134	14.5	+2.0
Majority		326	35.4	+12.0
Turnout		922	35.1	
Independent hold		Swing		

Clevedon North
Party	Candidate	Votes	%	±%
Conservative	Robert Garner	422	45.3	−13.1
Independent	Carole Wring	378	40.6	+40.6
Green	John Brenton	132	14.2	+14.2
Majority		44	4.7	−26.7
Turnout		932	42.5	
Conservative gain from Independent		Swing		

Clevedon South
Party	Candidate	Votes	%	±%
Conservative	Anne-Marie Gregory	322	39.0	+12.1
Labour	Alan Cotton	292	35.4	−4.0
Liberal Democrats	Graham Watkins	212	25.7	−8.0
Majority		30	3.6	
Turnout		826	35.6	
Conservative gain from Labour		Swing		

Clevedon Walton
Party	Candidate	Votes	%	±%
Conservative	John Norton-Sealey	787	64.6	+12.2
Liberal Democrats	Jack Dagnall	431	35.4	−12.2
Majority		356	29.2	+24.3
Turnout		1,218	51.5	
Conservative hold		Swing		

Clevedon West
Party	Candidate	Votes	%	±%
Conservative	Christopher Blades	580	54.7	+26.5
Labour	Chanel Stevens	481	45.3	−0.6
Majority		99	9.3	
Turnout		1,061	43.6	
Conservative gain from Labour		Swing		

Clevedon Yeo
Party	Candidate	Votes	%	±%
Conservative	Colin Hall	432	58.1	+12.4
Labour	Alistair Lindsay	312	41.9	+10.6
Majority		120	16.1	+1.6
Turnout		744	30.8	
Conservative hold		Swing		

Congresbury
Party	Candidate	Votes	%	±%
Green	Tom Leimdorfer	822	65.3	+6.6
Conservative	Christine Davis	401	31.9	−9.4
Independent	Michael Palmer	36	2.9	+2.9
Majority		421	33.4	+16.1
Turnout		1,259	46.7	
Green hold		Swing		

Easton-in-Gordano
Party	Candidate	Votes	%	±%
Conservative	Carl Francis-Pester	724	72.3	+10.9
Liberal Democrats	Mac Jordan	277	27.7	+4.8
Majority		447	44.7	+6.2
Turnout		1,001	44.8	
Conservative hold		Swing		

Gordano
Party	Candidate	Votes	%	±%
Conservative	Nigel Ashton	819	76.3	+9.2
Liberal Democrats	Evelyn Elworthy	254	23.7	+2.9
Majority		565	52.7	+6.4
Turnout		1,073	47.0	
Conservative hold		Swing		

Hutton & Locking (2)
Party	Candidate	Votes	%	±%
Conservative	Elfan Rees	1,330		
Conservative	Ian Peddlesden	1,325		
Liberal Democrats	Andrew Nisbet	398		
Liberal Democrats	Charles Havill	385		
Labour	Christopher Belton-Reed	198		
Labour	Timothy Taylor	184		
Turnout		3,820	39.5	
Conservative hold		Swing		
Conservative hold		Swing		

Kewstoke
Party	Candidate	Votes	%	±%
Conservative	Ian Porter	607	63.2	+10.5
Liberal Democrats	Peter Hardaway	268	27.9	−3.8
Labour	Jacqueline Scholes	85	8.9	−6.6
Majority		339	35.3	+14.3
Turnout		960	37.6	
Conservative hold		Swing		

Nailsea East (2)
Party	Candidate	Votes	%	±%
Liberal Democrats	Andy Cole	1,188		
Conservative	Jan Barber	1,136		
Conservative	Bob Coleman	985		
Liberal Democrats	Alan Clarke	980		
Labour	Patrick Hearn	140		
Labour	Gaile Blake	118		
Turnout		4,547	44.6	
Liberal Democrats hold		Swing		
Conservative hold		Swing		

Nailsea North and West (3)
Party	Candidate	Votes	%	±%
Conservative	Jeremy Blatchford	1,476		
Conservative	Mary Blatchford	1,390		
Conservative	Anne Kemp	1,376		
Liberal Democrats	Bob Steadman	1,041		
Liberal Democrats	Robin Bell	1,032		
Liberal Democrats	James Tonkin	1,029		
Labour	Christopher Smart	312		
Labour	Ben Johnson	298		
Labour	Tony Probert	288		
Turnout		8,242	38.9	
Conservative gain from Liberal Democrats		Swing		
Conservative hold		Swing		
Conservative gain from Liberal Democrats		Swing		

Pill
Party	Candidate	Votes	%	±%
Independent	Nan Kirsen	809	79.9	+79.9
Labour	Patricia Gardener	203	20.1	−41.1
Majority		606	59.9	
Turnout		1,012	38.0	
Independent hold		Swing		

Portishead Central
Party	Candidate	Votes	%	±%
Conservative	Reyna Knight	313	38.4	+3.2
Liberal Democrats	Andy Wright	243	29.8	−11.5
Independent	Mike Wilks	200	24.5	+24.5
Labour	Lynne Buckner	60	7.4	−16.1
Majority		70	8.6	
Turnout		816	34.6	
Conservative gain from Liberal Democrats		Swing		

Portishead Coast
Party	Candidate	Votes	%	±%
Conservative	David Pasley	776	65.0	+5.5
Liberal Democrats	Rod Hoare	304	25.5	−15.0
Labour	Roger Whitfield	113	9.5	+9.5
Majority		472	39.6	+20.6
Turnout		1,193	49.4	
Conservative hold		Swing		

Portishead East
Party	Candidate	Votes	%	±%
Conservative	Arthur Terry	687	56.5	+17.1
Liberal Democrats	Phil Palmer	357	29.4	−2.2
Labour	Terry Lester	172	14.1	−14.9
Majority		330	27.1	+19.2
Turnout		1,216	37.6	
Conservative hold		Swing		

Portishead Redcliffe Bay
Party	Candidate	Votes	%	±%
Conservative	Felicity Baker	688	52.0	−8.2
Liberal Democrats	Jean Lord	572	43.3	+3.5
Labour	David McKeag	62	4.7	+4.7
Majority		116	8.8	−11.6
Turnout		1,322	49.8	
Conservative gain from Liberal Democrats		Swing		

Portishead South & North Weston
Party	Candidate	Votes	%	±%
Conservative	Alan McMurray	538	59.8	+28.0
Liberal Democrats	John Clark	361	40.2	−1.2
Majority		177	19.7	
Turnout		899	38.5	
Conservative gain from Liberal Democrats		Swing		

Portishead West
Party	Candidate	Votes	%	±%
Conservative	David Jolley	752	63.8	+45.7
Liberal Democrats	Sue Mason	345	29.3	+29.3
Labour	Kirsty Gardener	81	6.9	+6.9
Majority		407	34.6	
Turnout		1,178	45.1	
Conservative hold		Swing		

Weston-super-Mare Central (2)
Party	Candidate	Votes	%	±%
Conservative	Mike Kellaway-Marriott	486		
Conservative	Keith Morris	468		
Liberal Democrats	John Crockford-Hawley	431		
Liberal Democrats	Jeffrey Alen	374		
Independent	Richard Nightingale	370		
Independent	John Carter	252		
Labour	Michael Lyall	177		
Labour	Frederick Roberts	174		
Independent	Colin Granner	144		
Turnout		2,876	33.0	
Conservative gain from Liberal Democrats		Swing		
Conservative gain from Liberal Democrats		Swing		

Weston-super-Mare Clarence & Uphill (3)
Party	Candidate	Votes	%	±%
Conservative	Peter Bryant	1,800		
Conservative	Michael Roe	1,777		
Conservative	Clive Webb	1,708		
Liberal Democrats	Paula Howell	836		
Liberal Democrats	Anthony Helliker	672		
Liberal Democrats	June How	670		
Labour	Jose Bateman	310		
Labour	Stephen Varney	295		
Labour	Alison Yianni	280		
Turnout		8,348	40.5	
Conservative hold		Swing		
Conservative hold		Swing		
Conservative hold		Swing		

Weston-super-Mare East (3)
Party	Candidate	Votes	%	±%
Conservative	Dawn Payne	1,497		
Conservative	William Collins	1,345		
Conservative	Robert Cleland	1,306		
Labour	Derek Kraft	963		
Labour	Richard Tucker	951		
Labour	Muriel Kraft	914		
Liberal Democrats	Gary Longmore	529		
Liberal Democrats	Edward Mason	526		
Liberal Democrats	Richard Oddy	493		
Turnout		8,524	31.5	
Conservative gain from Labour		Swing		
Conservative gain from Labour		Swing		
Conservative gain from Labour		Swing		

Weston-super-Mare Milton & Old Worle (3)
Party	Candidate	Votes	%	±%
Conservative	Roz Willis	1,630		
Conservative	Lisa Pilgrim	1,537		
Conservative	Sue Creasey	1,534		
Liberal Democrats	Astra Brand	904		
Liberal Democrats	Jenny Gosden	889		
Liberal Democrats	Norman Sycamore	745		
UKIP	Steven Pearse-Danker	454		
Labour	Bee Edmunds	367		
Labour	Adrian Tucker	362		
Labour	Michael O'Regan	293		
Turnout		8,715	41.8	
Conservative hold		Swing		
Conservative gain from Liberal Democrats		Swing		
Conservative gain from Liberal Democrats		Swing		

Weston-super-Mare South (3)
Party	Candidate	Votes	%	±%
Labour	Ian Parker	1,039		
Labour	Bob Bateman	958		
Labour	Debbie Stone	860		
Liberal Democrats	Mari Owens	508		
Liberal Democrats	Zena Canniford	455		
Conservative	Michael Dolley	440		
Liberal Democrats	Valerie Field	409		
Independent	Adam Nash	284		
Turnout		4,953	27.4	
Labour hold		Swing		
Labour hold		Swing		
Labour hold		Swing		

Weston-super-Mare South Worle (3)
Party	Candidate	Votes	%	±%
Liberal Democrats	Gully Hayer	1,138		
Liberal Democrats	Christopher Howell	1,017		
Liberal Democrats	Edward Keating	970		
Conservative	John Wiltshire	814		
Conservative	John Ley-Morgan	808		
Labour	Paul Francis	531		
Labour	Simon Arlidge	482		
Labour	Simon Stokes	460		
Turnout		6,220	27.8	
Liberal Democrats hold		Swing		
Liberal Democrats hold		Swing		
Liberal Democrats hold		Swing		

Weston-super-Mare West (3)
Party	Candidate	Votes	%	±%
Conservative	Andrew Horler	1,353		
Conservative	Chris Kimitri	1,265		
Conservative	Dawn Parry	1,256		
Liberal Democrats	Mark Canniford	1,254		
Liberal Democrats	Mike Bell	1,250		
Liberal Democrats	Robert Payne	1,053		
UKIP	Paul Spencer	281		
Labour	Robert Craig	208		
Labour	Peter Williams	186		
Labour	David Roxburgh	166		
Turnout		8,272	42.3	
Conservative gain from Liberal Democrats		Swing		
Conservative gain from Liberal Democrats		Swing		
Conservative gain from Liberal Democrats		Swing		

Winford
Party	Candidate	Votes	%	±%
Independent	Hugh Gregor	534	54.1	+54.1
Conservative	Anita Heappey	453	45.9	−11.7
Majority		81	8.2	
Turnout		987	41.4	
Independent gain from Conservative		Swing		

Wraxall & Long Ashton (2)
Party	Candidate	Votes	%	±%
Conservative	Bob Cook	1,504		
Conservative	Howard Roberts	1,181		
Liberal Democrats	Angela Neale	1,101		
Turnout		3,786	43.3	
Conservative hold		Swing		
Conservative hold		Swing		

Wrington
Party	Candidate	Votes	%	±%
Liberal Democrats	Deborah Yamanaka	578	45.0	−22.8
Conservative	Peter Ellis	421	32.8	+0.6
Independent	Hilary Burn	286	22.3	+22.3
Majority		157	12.2	−23.4
Turnout		1,285	54.3	
Liberal Democrats hold		Swing		

Yatton (3)
Party	Candidate	Votes	%	±%
Independent	Tony Moulin	1,549		
Conservative	Jill Iles	1,227		
Conservative	Ericka Blades	1,095		
Liberal Democrats	Isabel Cummings	1,052		
Liberal Democrats	Wendy Griggs	958		
Liberal Democrats	Peter Kehoe	873		
Green	Juley Howard	785		
Labour	Bryan Moore	272		
Turnout		7,811	45.2	
Independent gain from Liberal Democrats		Swing		
Conservative gain from Liberal Democrats		Swing		
Conservative gain from Liberal Democrats		Swing		
