= North Somerset Council =

Local authority in Somerset, England

Type
- Type: Unitary authority

History
- Founded: 1 April 1996
- Preceded by: Avon County Council; Woodspring District Council

Leadership
- Chair: Caritas Charles, Portishead Independents since 12 May 2026
- Leader: Mike Bell, Liberal Democrat since 23 May 2023
- Chief Executive: Mandy Bishop since 18 August 2025

Structure
- Seats: 50 councillors
- Graph of the party split among 50 seats.
- Political groups: Administration (35) Labour (10) Green (8) Liberal Democrats (9) Portishead Ind. (3) Independent (5) Other parties (14) Conservative (12) Reform (2) Vacancy (1) Vacant (1)
- Length of term: Whole council elected every four years

Elections
- Voting system: First-past-the-post
- Last election: 4 May 2023
- Next election: 6 May 2027

Meeting place
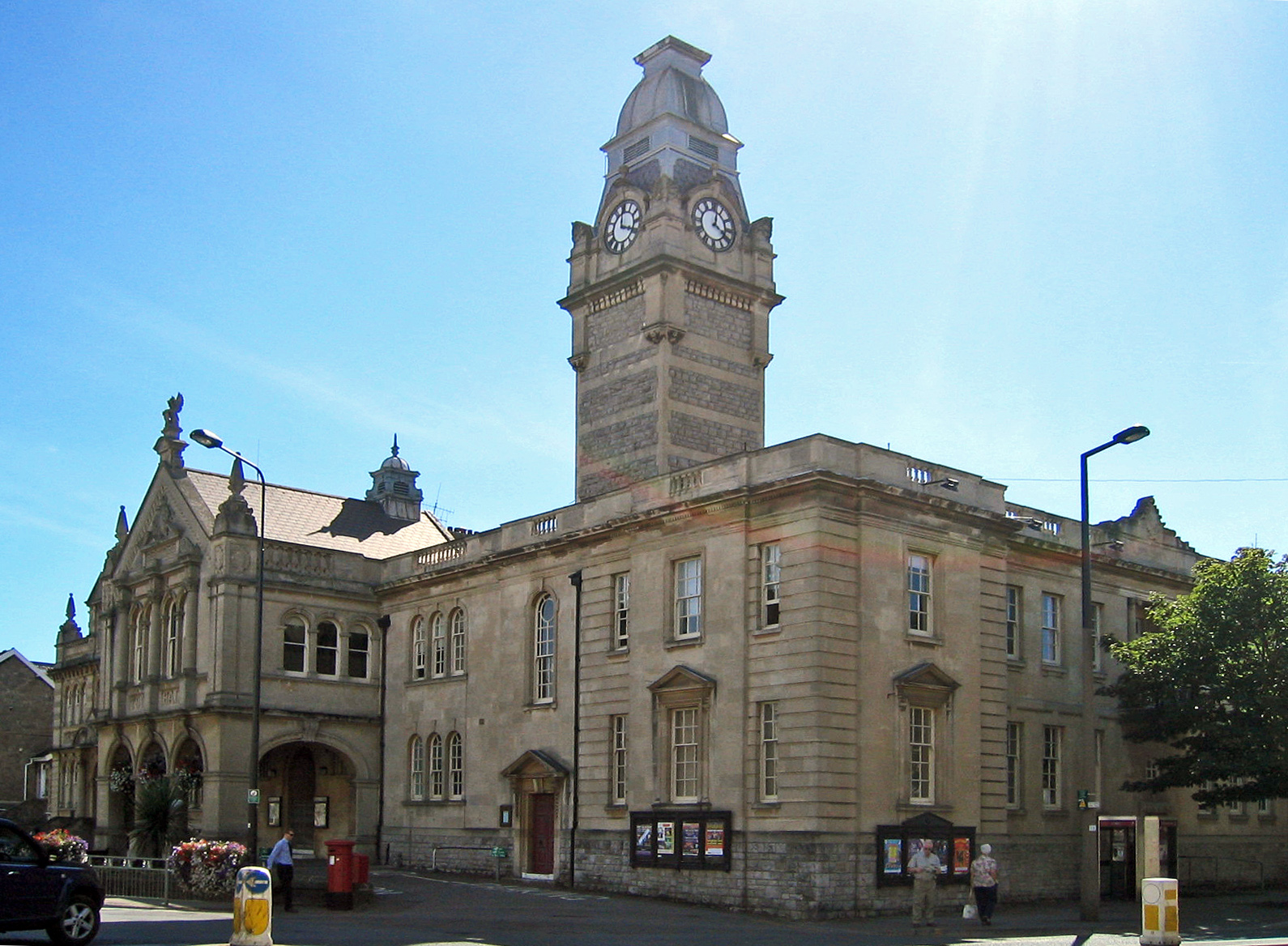
- Town Hall, Walliscote Grove Road, Weston-super-Mare, BS23 1UJ

Website
- www.n-somerset.gov.uk

North Somerset Council is the local authority of North Somerset, a local government district in the ceremonial county of Somerset, England. The council is a unitary authority, being a district council which also performs the functions of a county council.

The council has been under no overall control since 2019. It is based at Weston-super-Mare Town Hall.

== History ==
The district was formed in 1974 as Woodspring, one of six non-metropolitan districts in the new county of Avon. Woodspring was created from areas which had previously been in Somerset. Woodspring District Council was a lower-tier district council from 1974 until 1996, with Avon County Council providing county-level services.

The county of Avon was abolished in 1996 and four unitary authorities established to govern the area. The way the 1996 change was implemented was to rename the Woodspring district as North West Somerset, and to create a non-metropolitan county of North West Somerset covering the district, but with no separate county council. Instead, the existing district council also took on the functions that legislation assigns to county councils, making it a unitary authority. At the same time, the new district was transferred for ceremonial purposes back to Somerset, but as a unitary authority the council was always independent from Somerset County Council (which became a unitary authority itself in 2023).

In July 1995 the council resolved to change the name from 'North West Somerset' to 'North Somerset' with effect from when the reforms came into effect on 1 April 1996. Some years later the government identified that the council's decision to rename in 1995 may not have been technically valid, and so in 2005 the council passed another resolution formally changing the name to put the matter beyond doubt.

In 2017 the West of England Combined Authority was established, comprising the other three former Avon unitary authorities (Bath and North East Somerset Council, Bristol City Council and South Gloucestershire Council). Initial proposals for the combined authority had sought to include North Somerset Council too, but the council decided in 2016 not to join the combined authority. In November 2026 it was announced that North Somerset Council would join the West of England Combined Authority, subject to parliamentary approval, as part of a national devolution initiative by the Burnham government.

== Governance ==
North Somerset Council provides both county-level and district-level services. The whole area is also covered by civil parishes, which form a second tier of local government.

=== Political control ===
The council has been under no overall control since 2019. Following the 2023 election a coalition of Labour, the Liberal Democrats, Greens, local party the Portishead Independents and some of the independent councillors formed to run the council, led by Liberal Democrat councillor Mike Bell.

The first election to Woodspring District Council was held in 1973, initially operating as a shadow authority alongside the outgoing authorities until the new arrangements took effect on 1 April 1974. Political control of the council since 1974 has been as follows:

Woodspring District Council

| Party in control | Years |
|---|---|
| Conservative | 1974–1995 |
| No overall control | 1995–1996 |

North Somerset Council (unitary authority)

| Party in control | Years |
|---|---|
| Liberal Democrats | 1996–1999 |
| Conservative | 1999–2003 |
| No overall control | 2003–2007 |
| Conservative | 2007–2019 |
| No overall control | 2019–present |

=== Leadership ===
The leaders of the council since 2005 have been:

| Councillor | Party | From | To |
|---|---|---|---|
| Alan Hockridge | Liberal Democrats | 2005 | 14 Apr 2007 |
| Nigel Ashton | Conservative | 2007 | May 2019 |
| Don Davies | Independent | 14 May 2019 | 10 May 2022 |
| Steve Bridger | Independent | 10 May 2022 | May 2023 |
| Mike Bell | Liberal Democrats | 23 May 2023 | |

=== Composition ===
Following the 2023 North Somerset Council election and subsequent by-elections and changes of allegiance up to May 2025, the composition of the council was:

| Party | Councillors |
|---|---|
| Conservative | 13 |
| Labour | 10 |
| Green | 8 |
| Liberal Democrats | 8 |
| Portishead Independents | 3 |
| Reform | 1 |
| Independent | 7 |
| Total | 50 |

Of the independent councillors, four sit in a group with the Liberal Democrats, one sits with the Portishead Independents, and two sit with the Conservatives. The next election is due in 2027.

== Elections ==
Since the last boundary changes in 2015 the council has comprised 50 councillors representing 35 wards, with each ward electing one or two councillors. Elections are held every four years.

== Premises ==
The council is based at Weston-super-Mare Town Hall on Walliscote Grove Road. The building had been the headquarters of the old Weston-super-Mare Borough Council, one of Woodspring's predecessors, having been built in 1856 for the town's improvement commissioners, predecessors of the borough council. The building has substantial modern extensions.
