= Weston-super-Mare =

Seaside town in Somerset, England

Coordinates: 51°20′52″N 2°58′41″W

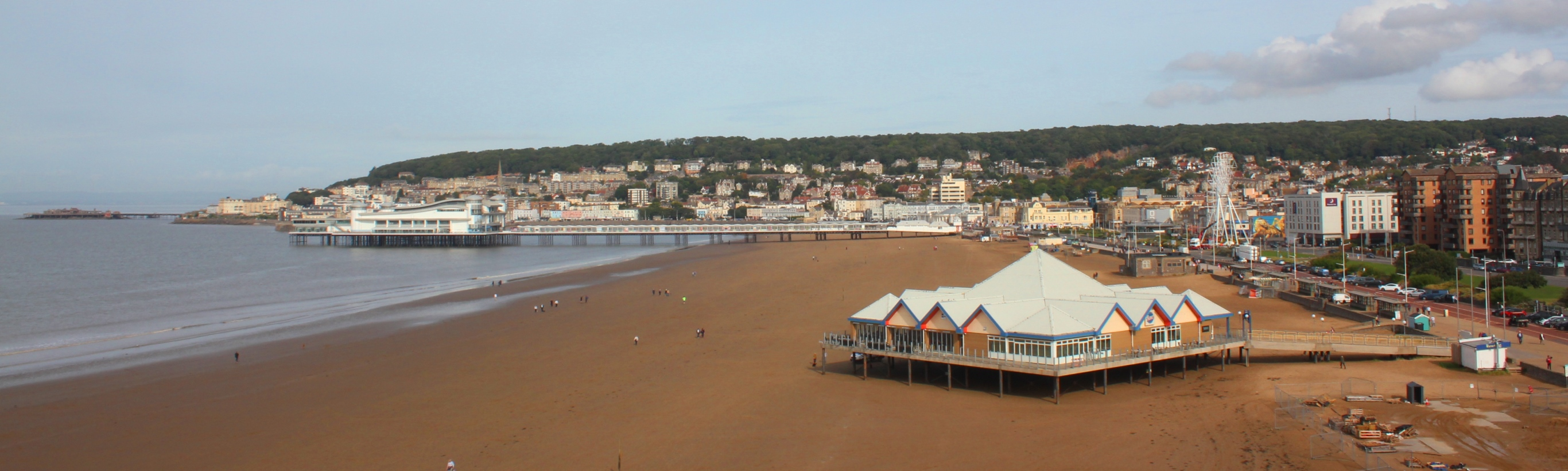
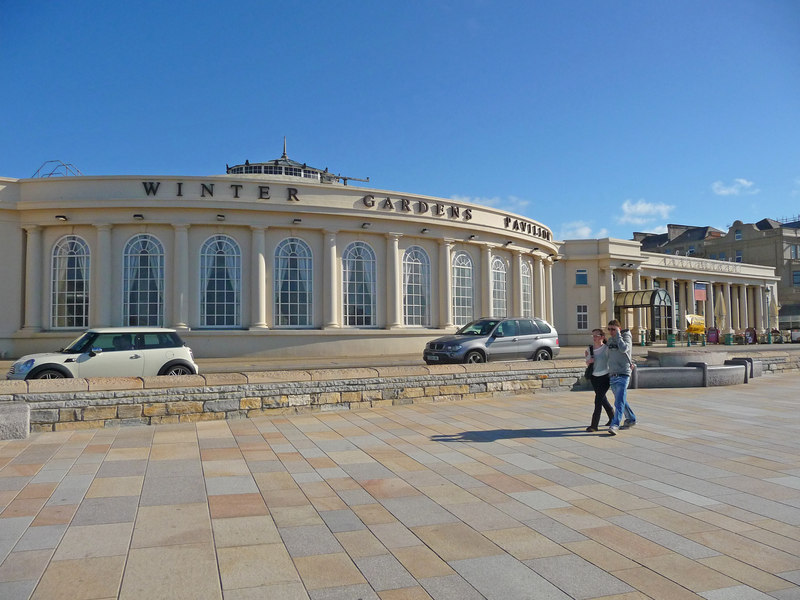
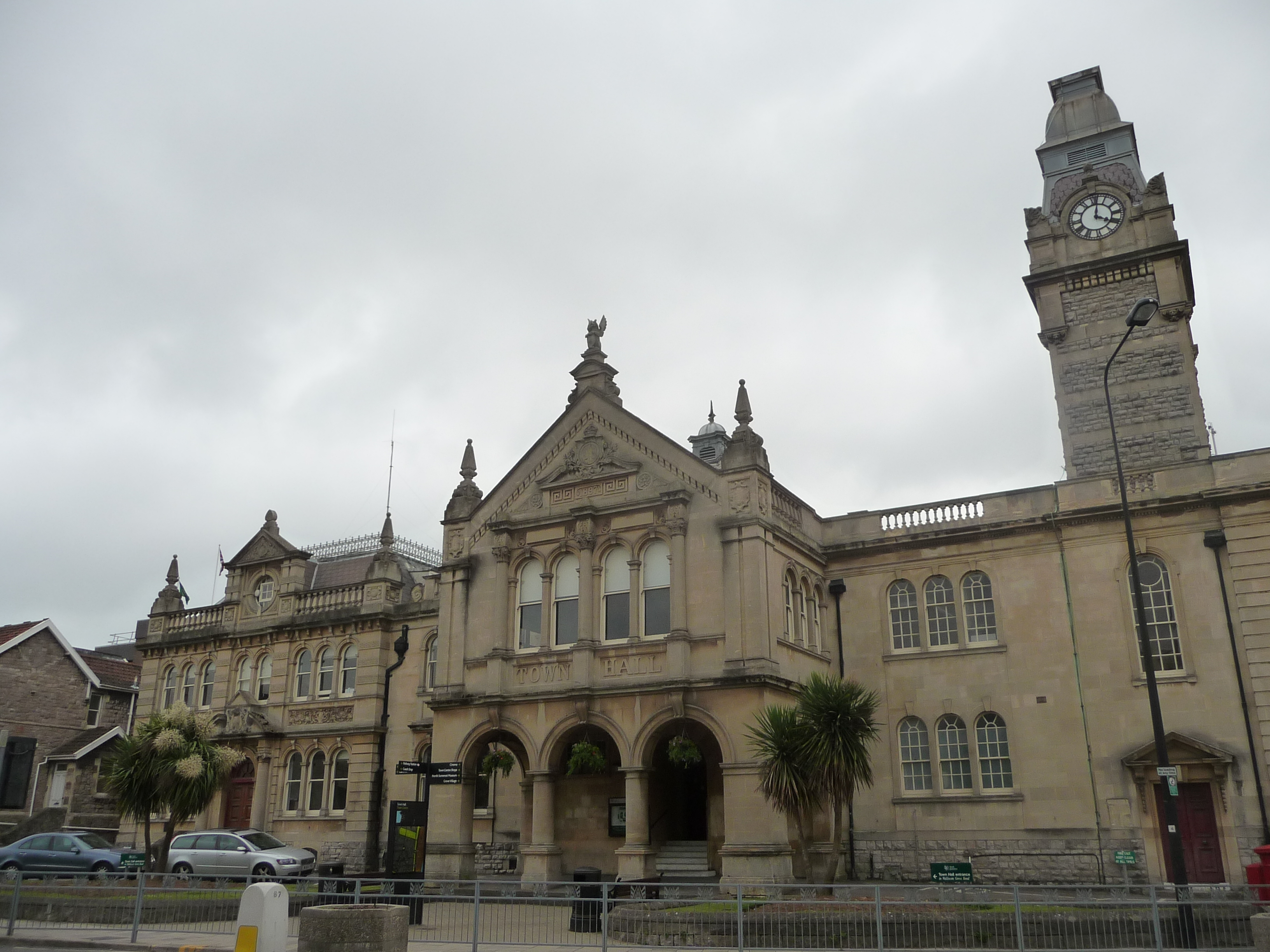
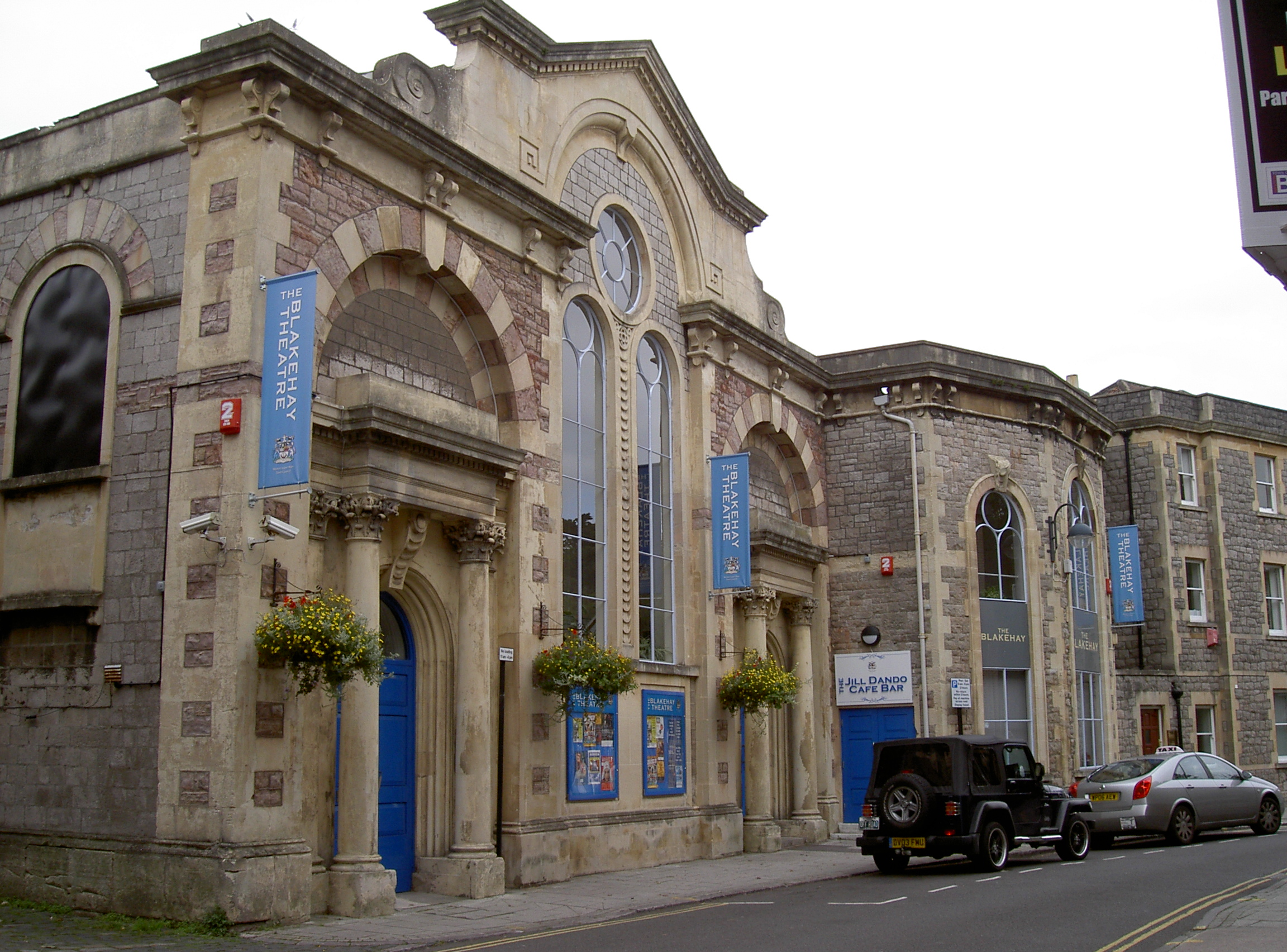
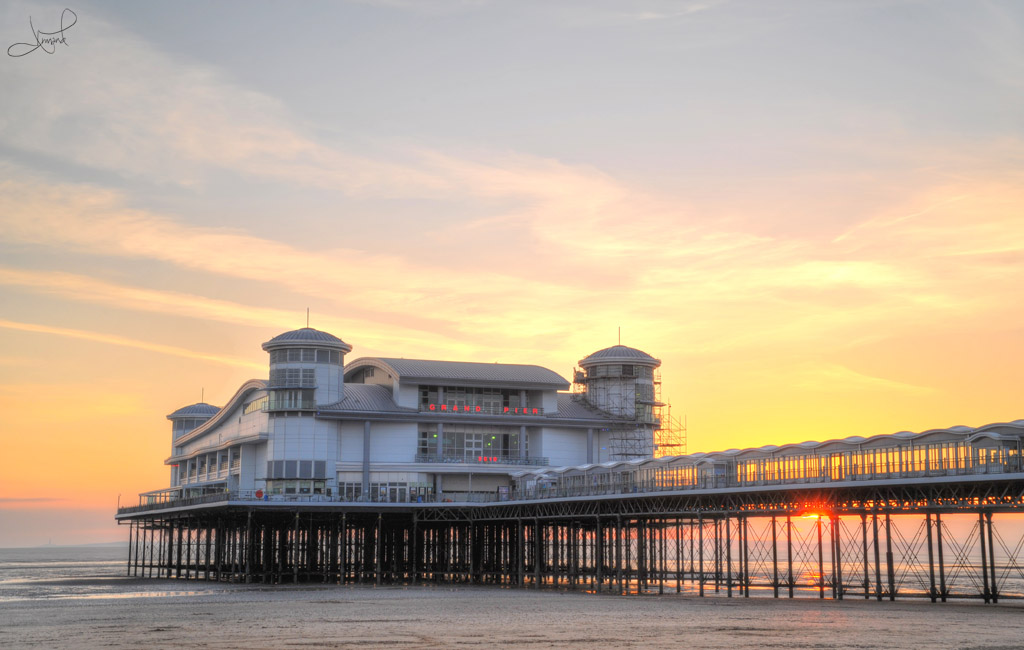
- From the top to bottom-right, Weston-super-Mare beach, Winter Gardens Pavilion, Town Hall, Blakehay Theatre, Grand Pier

- Location within Somerset
- Interactive map of Weston-super-Mare
- Population: 82,225 (Parish, 2021); 84,605 (Built-up area, 2021)
- Demonym: Westonian
- OS grid reference: ST320613
- Civil parish: Weston-super-Mare
- Unitary authority: North Somerset
- Ceremonial county: Somerset
- Region: South West
- Country: England
- Sovereign state: United Kingdom
- Post town: Weston-super-Mare
- Postcode district: BS22–BS24
- Dialling code: 01934
- Police: Avon and Somerset
- Fire: Avon
- Ambulance: South Western
- UK Parliament: Weston-super-Mare

Weston-super-Mare (/ ... ˈmɛər/ ... MAIR) is a seaside town and civil parish in the North Somerset unitary district, in the ceremonial county of Somerset, England. It lies by the Bristol Channel 20 miles (32 km) south-west of Bristol between Worlebury Hill and Bleadon Hill. At the 2021 census, the parish had a population of 82,225 and the built-up area had a population of 84,605.

The area around the town has been occupied since the Iron Age. It was still a small village until the 19th century when it developed as a seaside resort. A railway station and two piers were built. In the second half of the 20th century it was connected to the M5 motorway but the number of people holidaying in the town declined and some local industries closed, although the number of day visitors has risen.

Attractions include the Grand Pier, Weston Museum and The Helicopter Museum. Cultural venues include The Playhouse, the Winter Gardens and the Blakehay Theatre.

The Bristol Channel has the second largest tidal range in the world; the low tide mark in Weston Bay is about 1 mile (1.6 km) from the seafront. The beach is sandy but low tide reveals areas of thick mud which are dangerous to walk on. The mouth of the River Axe is at the south end of the beach. To the north of the town is Sand Point, which marks the upper limit of the Bristol Channel and the lower limit of the Severn Estuary. In the centre of the town is Ellenborough Park, which is a biological Site of Special Scientific Interest (SSSI) due to the range of plant species found there.

== Toponymy ==
Weston comes from the Old English word for west, and tūn, a word with several different meanings. Although it is most likely to have an original meaning of enclosure, it could also mean settlement, farmstead or estate. Super-mare is Latin for "upon the sea" and was added to distinguish it from other settlements named Weston in the Diocese of Bath and Wells.

Other 'tuns' nearby are Norton (the 'north tun'), which was in existence by the early 13th century and is probably of at least late Anglo-Saxon foundation. Milton (from Old English middel tūn) on Worlebury Hill is mentioned in Domesday Book of 1086 and is so likely to be of at least late Anglo-Saxon origin. Taking the three places together – the west, the middle, and the north tuns – their directions might relate to Worle, which was already a substantial estate by the time of the Domesday survey. Weston itself is not identified by name in Domesday, although Ashcombe is and the valued property in Weston is most likely to have been included with that for Ashcombe. Evidence of pre-Norman agriculture in Weston can be derived from modern locations such as Worthy Place and Blakehay (worth and hay being Old English words relating to farming enclosures).

The town was known as Weston-juxta-Mare ('beside the sea') prior to 1348; the name seems to have been changed to this during the time when Ralph of Shrewsbury was Bishop of Bath and Wells from 1329 to 1363. Between the 14th and 17th centuries the juxta-mare part of the name disappeared and it was known as just Weston. In 1610 it was recorded as 'Weston on the More', with 'more' in this context most likely to be in the Somerset sense of 'moor' as low lying, damp, semi-marshland.

== History ==
=== Early history ===
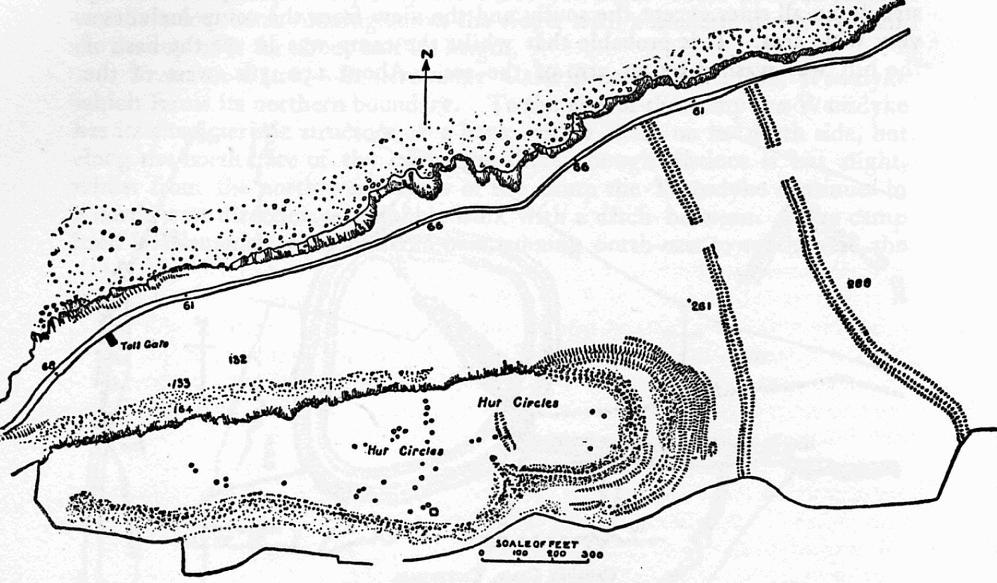
Plan of Worlebury Camp

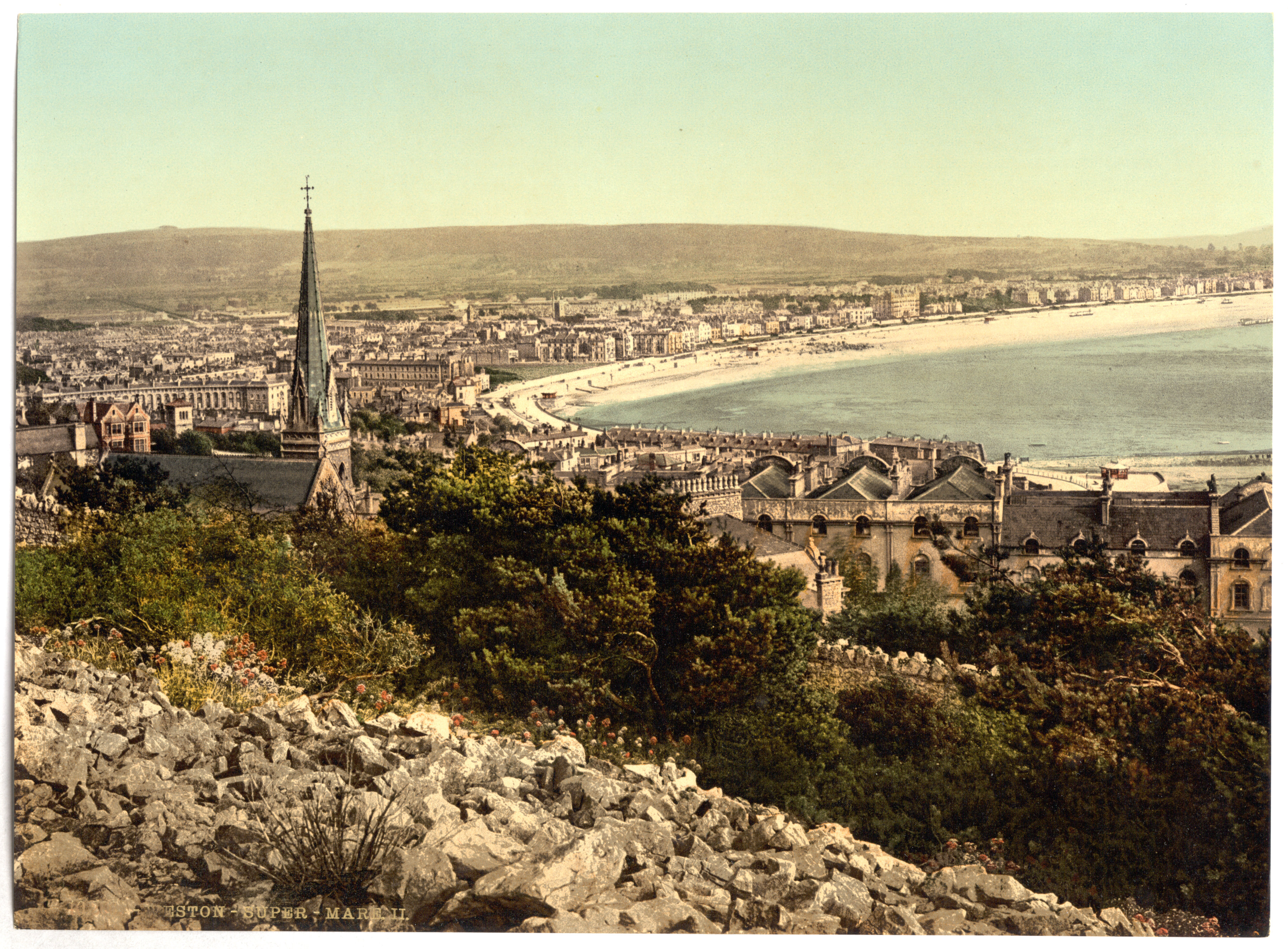
View south from Worlebury Camp c. 1900 with Trinity Church prominent

Weston's oldest structure is Worlebury Camp on Worlebury Hill which dates from the Iron Age.

Outside the hillfort are many rock-cut burials and fragmentary remains which have been discovered during the course of progressive development on the southern slope of the hill. Two particular clusters of these burials have been identified: one in the Montpelier area, and the other to the north-east of Knightstone Road. Recent researchers suggest that there may have been a major Iron Age cemetery related to the hillfort, in the area near Knightstone Road, the site later chosen for the parish church, suggesting a link to the Iron Age burials. Many of these remains were chance finds during building work in the 19th and early 20th century and were poorly recorded. During archaeological evaluation work in 2005, prior to the construction of a new parish room on the north-western side of St John's church, a crouched inhumation burial, with pottery indicating a mid- to late-Iron Age date, was discovered within the churchyard, below a series of unmarked post-medieval burials. (Note: There was controversy surrounding the Iron Age male burial when the incumbent of the church refused the person a reburial in the churchyard on the grounds that he had not been a Christian, despite the fact that the ground had presumably been sacred to the individual and his community for probably 1,500 years or more before any Christian church had been established on the site. The excavator of the burial considered that there was a very real possibility that the location for the church had been chosen precisely because people in the early medieval period knew that it was the site of a pre-existing burial ground.)

An occupation site of Romano-British date was investigated in 2008–2009 as part of a planning application by Weston College immediately to the west of their School of Science and Art, on the south side of South Terrace. This built on investigations that had already been carried out on the site in the late 1950s which strongly suggested the presence of Romano-British occupation. It is the only site known of this date in central Weston and was probably a small farmstead or hamlet. Finds included a burial of a male individual who had clearly led a very hard life, and had suffered multiple medical conditions which were expressed on his skeletal remains. It is possible that he had been a slave.

Defences were built after the Norman Conquest near the settlements on Worlebury Hill at Worle (today's Castle Batch) and Ashcombe.{ The parish was part of the Hundred of Winterstoke. The medieval church of St John was demolished in 1824 and rebuilt on the same site. The former rectory, now known as Glebe House, is a largely 19th-century structure remodelled from a much older building. Seventeenth-century timbers survive in what was originally the entrance hall. It is Weston-super-Mare's oldest surviving building.

The Pigott family of Brockley were the lord of the manor of Weston-super-Mare and Ashcombe from 1695. They built a summer residence at Grove House near the church two years later.

The Old Thatched Cottage restaurant on the seafront is listed Grade II. Its official Historic England list entry states that it is 'late 18th century, certainly before 1804'. The building carries the date 1774 but the date of its construction is unknown. Evidence exists that it was definitely built by June 1804.

=== 19th century ===
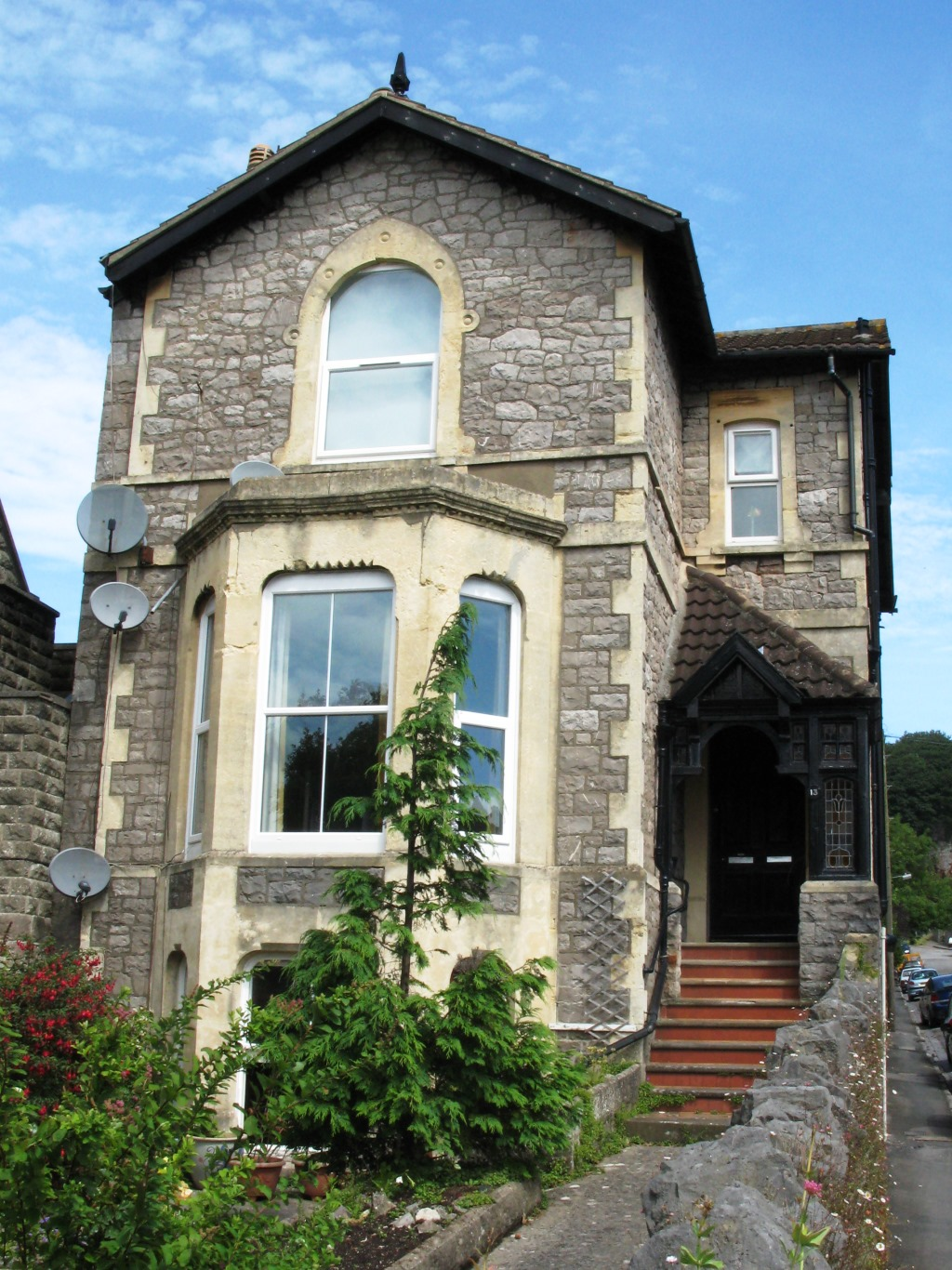
A house built in Hans Price's distinctive style

Weston was a small village of about 30 houses in the early part of the 19th century. They were some 2 mi (3.2 km) from Uphill, the moors between the two villages having some protection from the sea by a line of sand dunes which had grown after the Bristol Channel floods of 1607. Sea bathing became fashionable in England in the second half of the 18th century and people started to visit to Uphill and Weston for the sea. The town's growth during the 19th century was largely due to its development as a seaside resort. The first hotel was built in 1807–1810. At first it was just 'The Hotel' but later became 'Reeve's Hotel' and is now part of the Royal Hotel. It opened in 1810 but closed from time to time until opening permanently in 1814. A bath house using sea water was opened on Knightstone Island in 1820 which was later linked to the mainland by a causeway. A walkway was built along the dunes in 1826 from Knightstone to the hotel and in 1829 an extension carried it to the end of Regent Street.

John Pigott sold off some land for development from 1807 but retained 396 acres (160 ha) on the hill which was planted with trees in 1823, creating a game reserve and what became Weston Woods. An estate road was opened through the woods on the north side of the hill in 1848; it was open to the public and was a private toll road for many years.

The sale of the estate's land resulted in high-density housing being built south of Watersill Road (now Regent Street) and houses for the middle classes in the Whitecross area which extended to the town boundary at Moorland Road. Large detached villas were built on the southern slopes of Worlebury Hill. Many of the houses and public buildings erected from about 1870 were built from local grey limestone with details of soft yellow Bath Stone and slate roofs. These were designed by local architect Hans Price.

The Bristol and Exeter Railway opened the first part of its line on 14 June 1841. A station at Weston Junction gave a connection to a station in the town centre. (Note: Isambard Kingdom Brunel, the Bristol and Exeter Railway's engineer, stayed in Weston at Swiss Villa (towards the north end of Trevelyan road) for a time.) The railway connected with the Great Western Railway at Bristol Temple Meads and made it easier for visitors from Bristol, the Midlands, London and further afield to travel to Weston for a day or longer holidays.

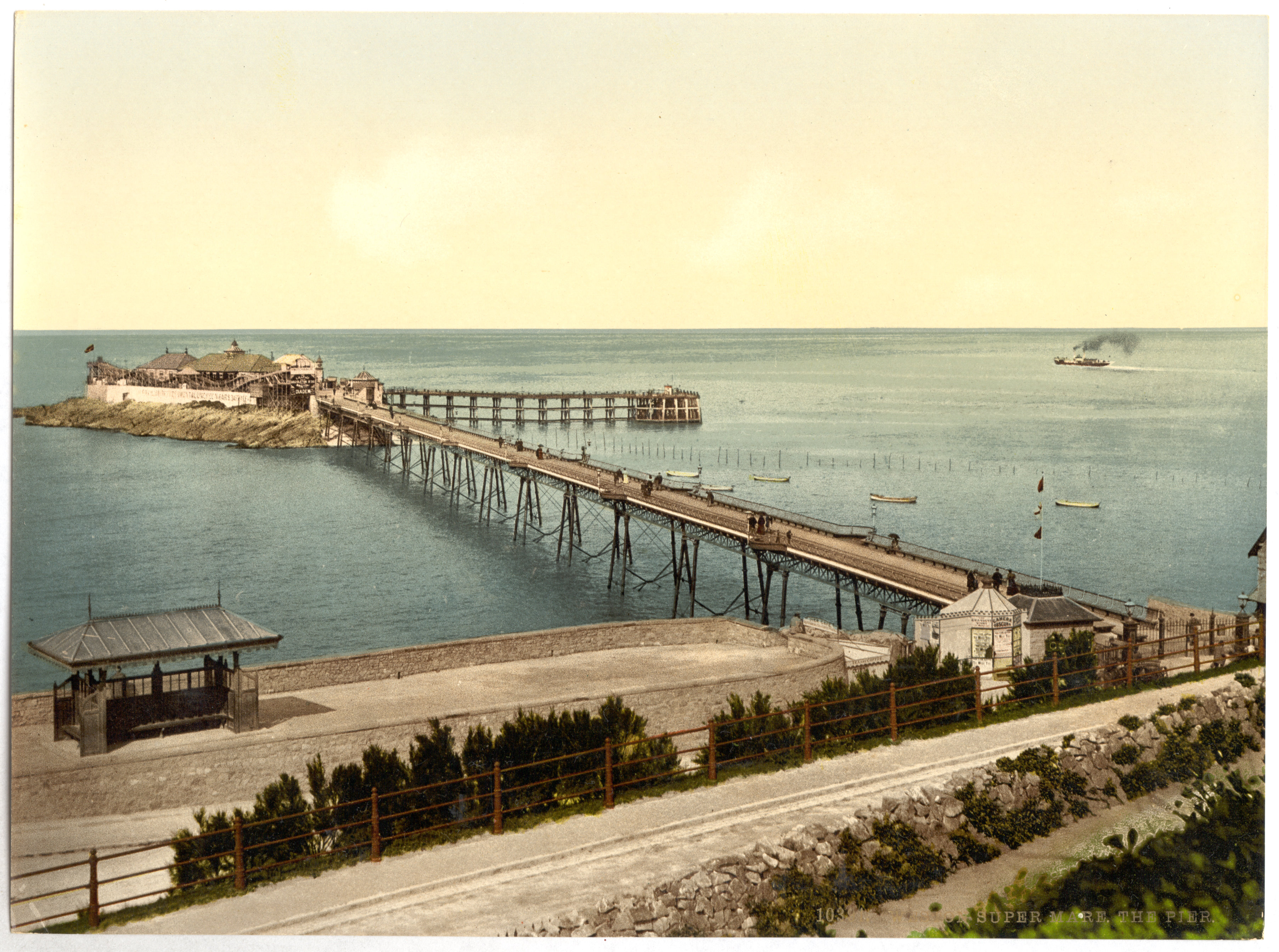
Birnbeck Pier c. 1900

Birnbeck Pier was opened in 1867 at the end of Worlebury Hill. Visitors, including many Welsh mining families, came across the Bristol Channel by paddle steamer to the pier. In its heyday it offered amusement arcades, tea rooms, amusement rides and a photographic studio. Although listed Grade II* it is now in a derelict state and is classed as 'highly vulnerable' on Historic England's Heritage at Risk Register. It was designed by Eugenius Birch with ironwork by the Isca Foundry of Newport, Monmouthshire.

The Seafront Improvement Scheme started in 1883. This saw the construction of the sea wall and esplanade, starting from Glentworth Bay at Knightstone. As far south as Regent Street it replaced the walkway of 1826 and reclaimed up to 40 ft (12 m) from the beach. By 1886 it had been completed south to the town boundary at the sanatorium. This section saw the sand dunes replaced by lawns, although the dunes beyond the sanatorium remain to this day. A further section was built to take it around the end of Worlebury Hill to Anchor Head and Birnbeck Pier.

The first transatlantic telegraph cable of the Commercial Cable Company was brought ashore at Weston in 1885. Guglielmo Marconi, the inventor of wireless telegraphy, successfully transmitted radio signals across the Bristol Channel in the spring of 1897, from Penarth (near Cardiff) to Brean Down, the promontory at the south end of Weston Bay.

A second railway, the Weston, Clevedon and Portishead Light Railway, opened on 1 December 1897, connecting Weston to Clevedon, the Weston terminus being at Ashcombe Road. The railway was extended to Portishead on 7 August 1907 but was closed in 1940.

=== 20th century ===
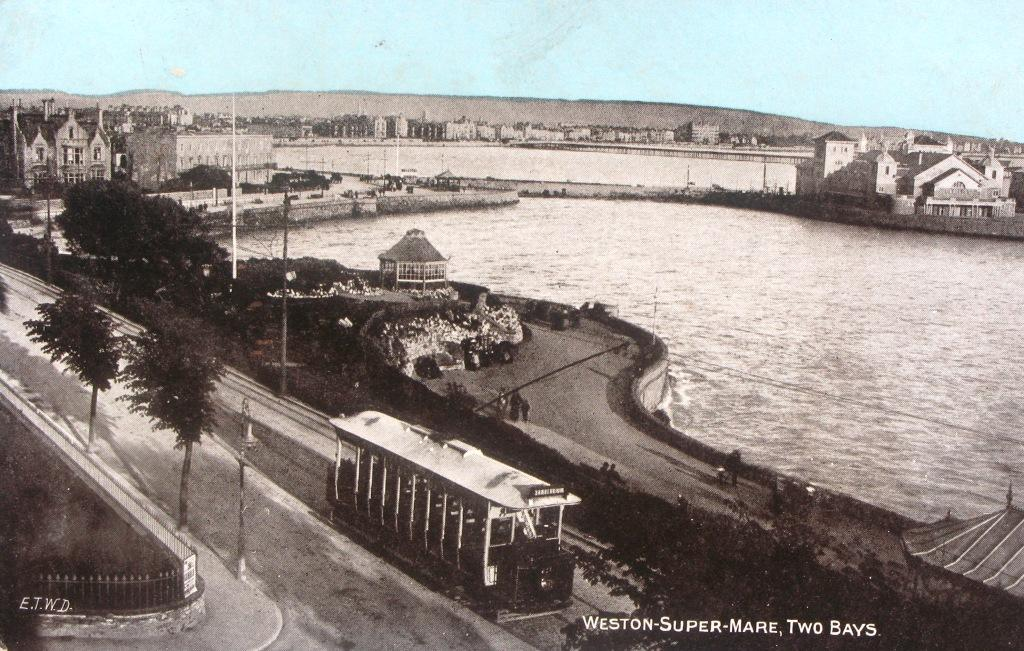
A 'toast rack' tram heading into town at Madeira Cove, c. 1904

A proposal for the Weston, Clevedon and Portishead Light Railway to run along the streets of the town to the sea front failed to materialise, but a 2.9-mile-long (4.7 km) 4 ft 8 1/2 in (1,435 mm) gauge Weston-super-Mare Tramways network opened on 12 May 1902. The main route ran from Birnbeck Pier along the sea front to the Sanatorium (now Royal Sands); a branch line ran to the railway station and on to the tram depot in Locking Road. The fleet originally consisted of 12 double-deck cars and 4 open-sided 'toast rack' cars. The system was bought out by the competing bus company and closed on 18 April 1937, by which time the fleet comprised 8 double-deck and 6 'toast racks'.

Local traders, unhappy that visitors arriving at Birnbeck Pier were not coming into the centre of the town, built a new pier closer to the main streets. Opened in 1904, and known as the Grand Pier, it was designed to be 1.5 miles (2.4 km) long.

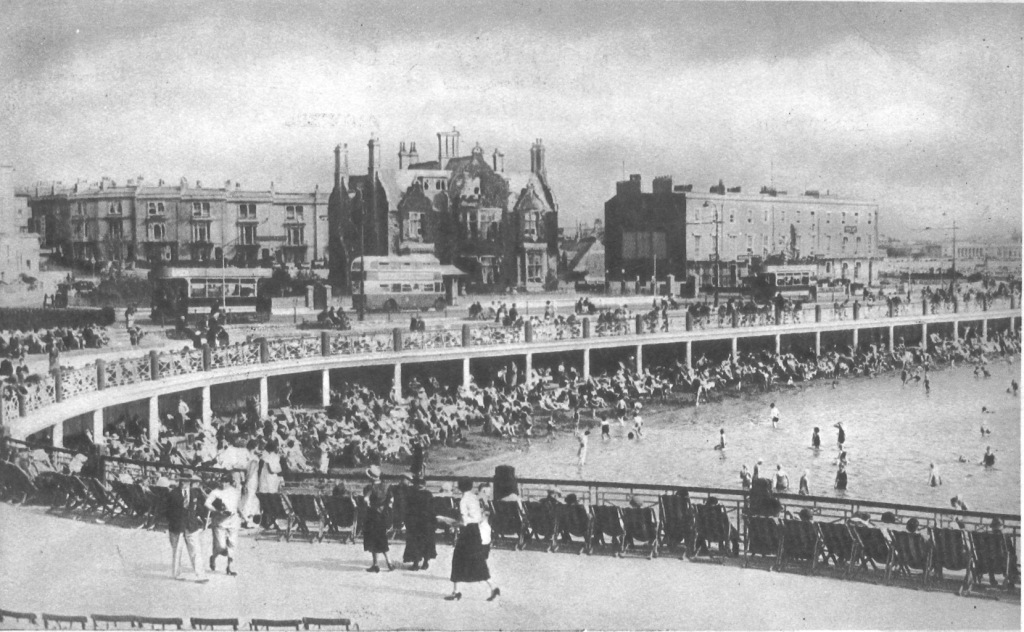
The Marine Lake c. 1935 when buses and trams were competing for passengers

Several cinemas opened after 1911, the one near the Town Hall being rebuilt as the Odeon Cinema (now the Plaza) in 1935 using a distinctive moderne style. The Winter Gardens Pavilion opened between the High Street and sea front in 1927, and in 1929 work was completed on the Marine Lake. A causeway was built across Glentworth Bay and facilities provided on the shore to create an area where sea bathing would be available at all states of the tide. The Open Air Pool (now the Tropicana), with its arched concrete diving board, opened in 1937 midway between the Grand Pier and the Sanatorium.

Weston Airfield opened in 1936, just outside the town on Locking Moor. Commercial flights were operated by Western Airways until World War II, the most popular being to Cardiff which flew twice an hour at busy periods. The site was also operated as RAF Weston-super-Mare by No. 24 Group. It served as a flying candidates selection and initial training facility, and as a relief airport during the war, latterly as the Polish Air Force Staff College from April 1944 to April 1946. Several factories were set up near the airfield, both on the Winterstoke Road in Oldmixon and nearer Locking, which became the targets for air raids. The Bristol Aeroplane Company diversified production after the war and started to build helicopters in 1956. The factory was taken over by Westland Helicopters in 1960 and the company operated in Weston until 2002, although production finished in 1987. The airfield closed in 1978 but Westland's bought it for training pilots.

The factories around the airfield attracted air raids and the town was also on the return route of bombers targeting Bristol and was itself bombed by the Luftwaffe. The first bombs fell in June 1940, but the worst attacks were in January 1941 and June 1942. Large areas of the town were destroyed, particularly Orchard Street and the Boulevard. On 3 and 4 January 1941, incendiary bombs fell on the town. The Air Ministry set up a "Q-station" decoy at Bleadon in an attempt to divert the bombers to an unpopulated area. In all, 110 civilians lost their lives through enemy action in the borough. United States Army troops were billeted in the area in the later part of the war but were moved elsewhere in the run-up to D-Day. Birnbeck Pier was taken over for weapons development as 'HMS Birnbeck'. During the war more than 10,000 evacuees were accommodated in the town; however, only 130 spent four or more years in the town.

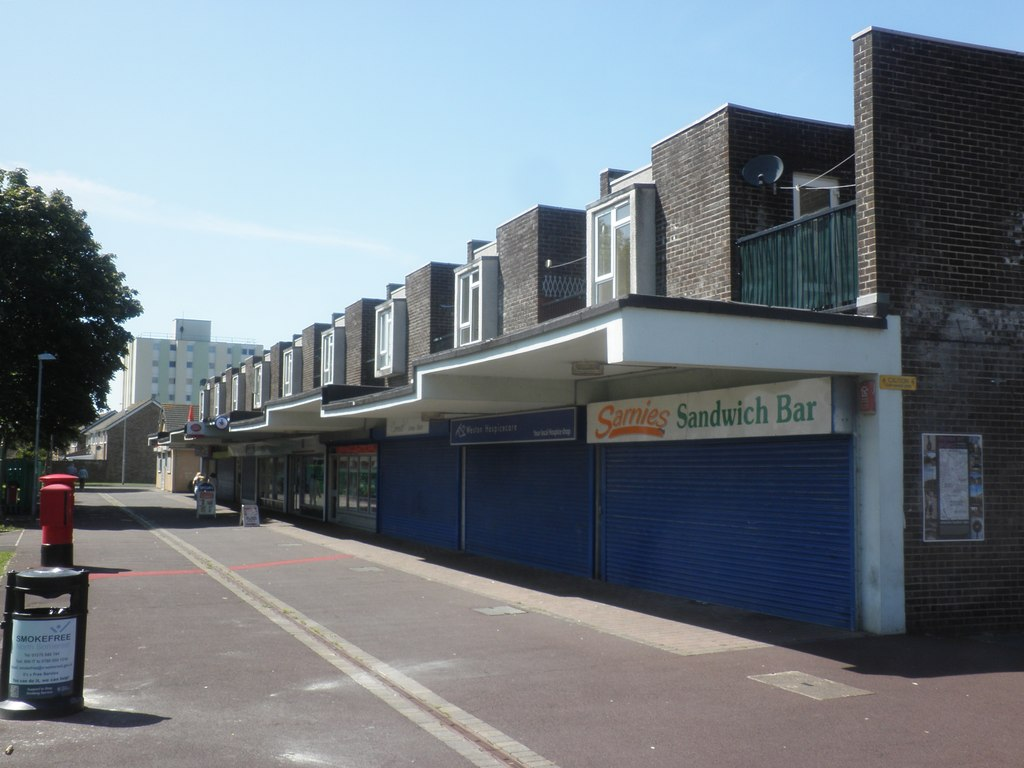
Shops in Oldmixon Estates

Milton was absorbed into the Weston-super-Mare Urban District in 1902 and residential areas expanded eastwards along the Locking Road and Milton Road. England's first council housing estate, enabled by the Housing, Town Planning, &c. Act 1919, was built at Milton Green in 1919. Further estates followed with Milton Brow on the hill and Bournville, which started to be developed in the south of the town before World War II. The town expanded again in 1932 when Worle and Uphill were absorbed. After the war Bournville was completed and other estates were built at Coronation in the 1950s and Oldmixon in the 1960s, the latter to support further industrial estates that were built off the Winterstoke Road. The opening of the M5 Motorway in the 1970s pulled development back to the east side of the town with new building around Worle and Locking Castle south of the railway line.

Victorian housing around Carlton Street (between the Town Hall and seafront) was demolished in the 1960s and the area redeveloped as the Dolphin Square shopping precinct. The Sovereign shopping centre was opened in 1992. Unlike Dolphin Square, this was fully covered and visible from the High Street.

A new Weston General Hospital was opened at Uphill in 1986. This replaced several older hospitals and health facilities around the town including the Royal West of England Sanatorium on the seafront, and the original Weston Hospital which had opened on Alfred Street in 1865 and expanded as the Queen Alexandra Memorial Hospital onto The Boulevard in 1927.

=== 21st century ===
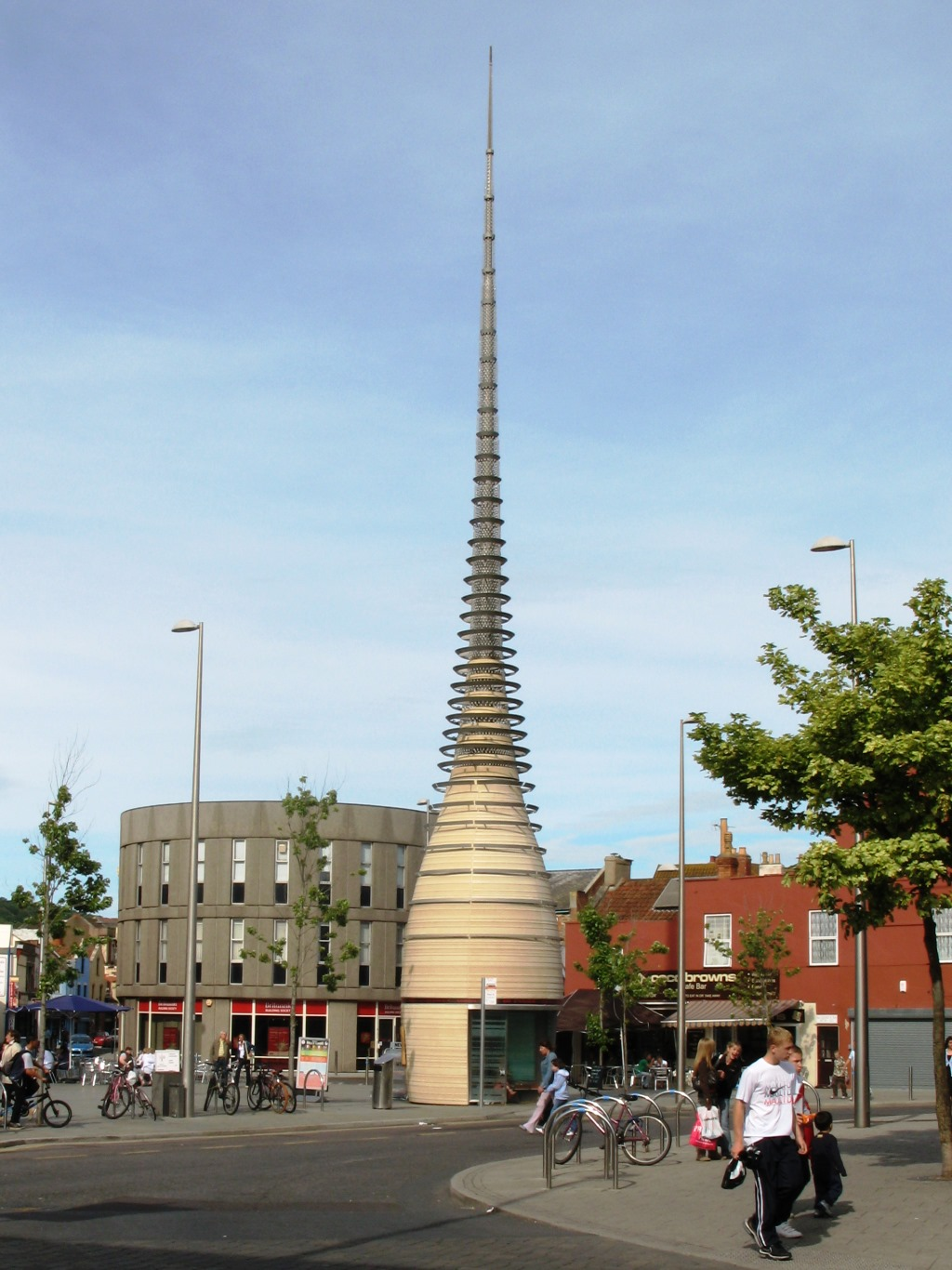
Silica, a piece of public art in the town centre

Weston saw a growth in residential drug and alcohol rehabilitation treatment centres in the early years of the 21st century. Related criminal and social problems were identified by local newspapers and the town council. They were also featured in John Penrose's maiden speech as a Member of Parliament in 2005. By 2009, Weston was home to around 11% of drug rehabilitation places in the UK, and North Somerset Council proposed an accreditation system examining the quality of counselling, staff training, transparency of referral arrangements, along with measures of the treatment's effectiveness and site inspections. There was a reduction in the number of rehabilitation facilities in the town by 2012, with the number of patient beds having nearly halved.

A structure known as Silica was installed at Big Lamp Corner during 2006. It is a piece of public art, an advertising sign, a retail kiosk selling newspapers and hot food, as well as a bus shelter. It was criticised by local residents who liken it to a carrot or a space ship, although it is meant to symbolise man's harmony with the sea. It was part of North Somerset Council's civic pride initiative that has sought to revitalise Weston-super-Mare's public spaces after a period of decline. There were also improvements to the street scene around Grove Park. A £34 million redevelopment of the promenade was completed in 2010. Scour protection and a splash wall were constructed between Knightstone and Oxford Street. Pier Square was pedestrianised, and Marine Lake was refurbished.

The Grand Pier's pavilion was destroyed by a fire on 28 July 2008. Work to build a new pavilion started in 2009 and it reopened on 23 October 2010. Birnbeck Pier was closed in 1994 and Weston-super-Mare lifeboat station, which had been at Birnbeck since 1882, moved to temporary facilities at Knightstone in 2013. After several private schemes to reopen the pier failed, North Somerset Council bought the pier in July 2023 with the intention of repairing it and returning the lifeboat station Birnbeck, although the Royal National Lifeboat Institution later withdrew from the project due to concerns about financing the repairs and maintaining the pier when they were complete. Restoration work began in February 2026, and by June the council reported that the project was progressing, with the pier expected to reopen in summer 2027.

Weston was chosen in March 2017 as one of the 10 successful bids for the first phase of the creation of Heritage Action Zones (HAZ), a scheme where Historic England works with local partners in places with significant historic environment to use that heritage to help build economic growth and other opportunities in the locality. Over a three-year period the Heritage Action Zone aimed to boost economic growth and researched Weston's heritage and urban development, by reviewing Weston's listed buildings, using aerial photographs, undertaking a historic characterisation of Weston-super-Mare, its land and sea environs and a report on the architecture of the town, which culminated with the publication in 2020 of a new book Weston-super-Mare The town and its seaside heritage.

== Governance ==
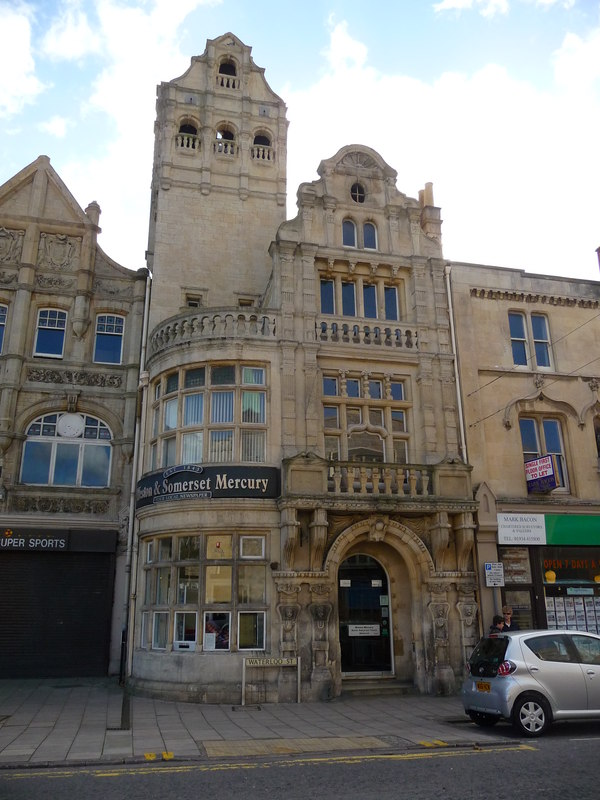
Town council's offices at 32 Waterloo Street, formerly the printing office of the Weston and Somerset Mercury

There are two tiers of local government covering Weston-super-Mare, at parish (town) and unitary authority level: Weston-super-Mare Town Council and North Somerset Council. The town council is based at 32 Waterloo Street. The building was formerly the printing office of the Weston and Somerset Mercury. It was built in 1885 and converted to become the town council's offices in 2024. North Somerset Council is also based in the town, having its headquarters at Weston-super-Mare Town Hall on Walliscote Road, the oldest parts of which date back to 1858.

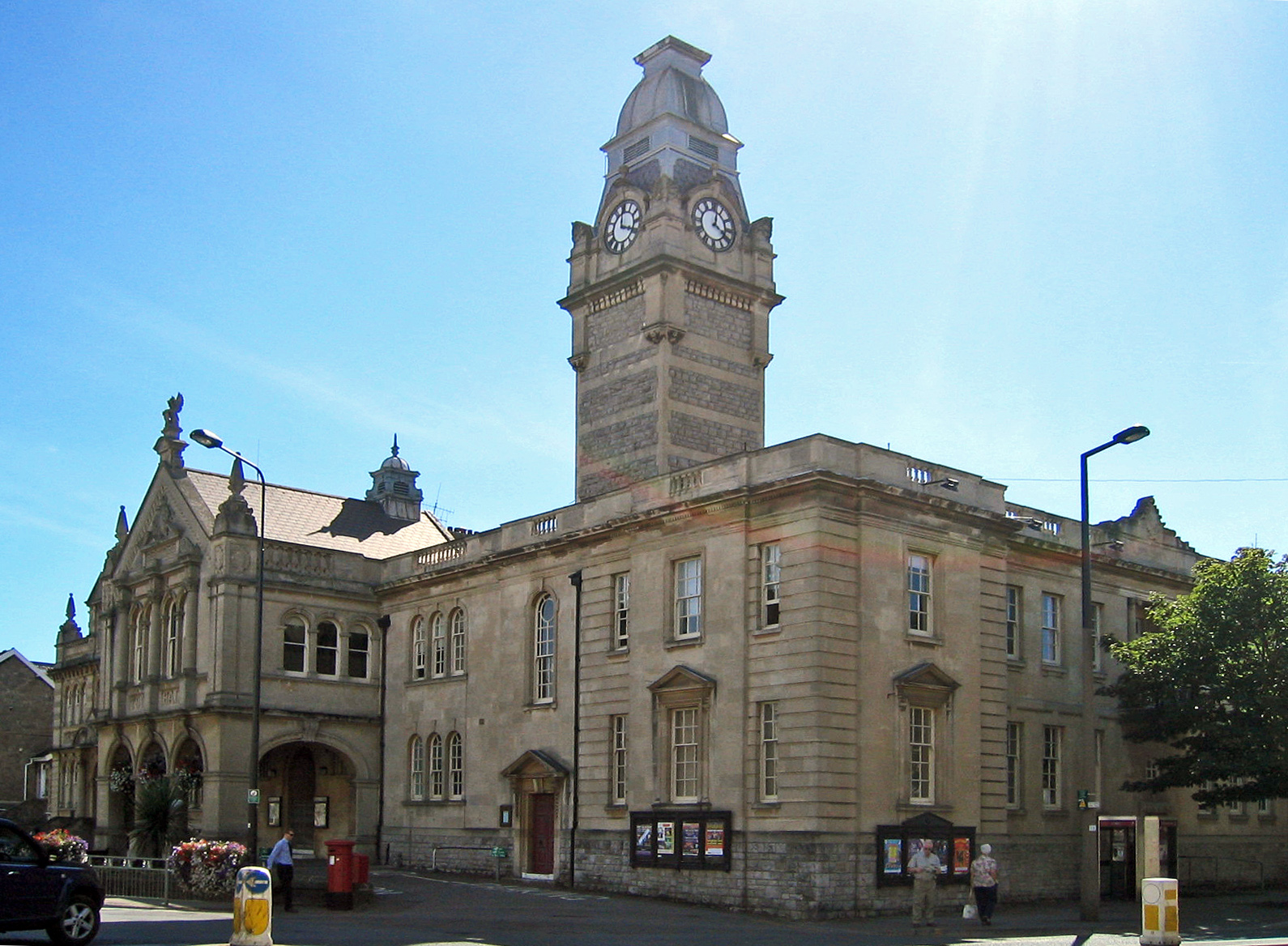
Weston-super-Mare Town Hall

For national elections, the town forms part of the Weston-super-Mare constituency, which also covers some nearby villages.

=== Administrative history ===
Weston-super-Mare was an ancient parish in the Winterstoke hundred of Somerset. As the modern town began to be developed in the 19th century, there was a need for more urban forms of local government. A body of improvement commissioners known as the Weston-super-Mare Town Commissioners was established in 1842 to administer the town.

The commissioner's area was subsequently made a local government district in 1859. The district initially just covered the nascent town, but was extended on a number of occasions such that by 1894 it covered the whole parish of Weston-super-Mare plus part of the parish of Uphill. Such districts were reconstituted as urban districts under the Local Government Act 1894, with an elected council replacing the commissioners.

The urban district was enlarged in 1933 to take in areas including Uphill and Worle. In 1937, the urban district was converted into a municipal borough. The borough council adopted the motto Ever Forward. The borough of Weston-super-Mare was abolished in 1974 under the Local Government Act 1972. The area became part of the new Woodspring district in the new county of Avon.

The county of Avon was abolished in 1996. Woodspring was then renamed North Somerset, and its council also took on county council functions, making it a unitary authority. For ceremonial purposes, the district was restored to Somerset at the same time.

No successor parish was created for the former borough of Weston-super-Mare at the time of the 1974 reforms, leaving it unparished. A new civil parish of Weston-super-Mare was subsequently created in 2000, with its parish council taking the name Weston-super-Mare Town Council.

== Geography ==
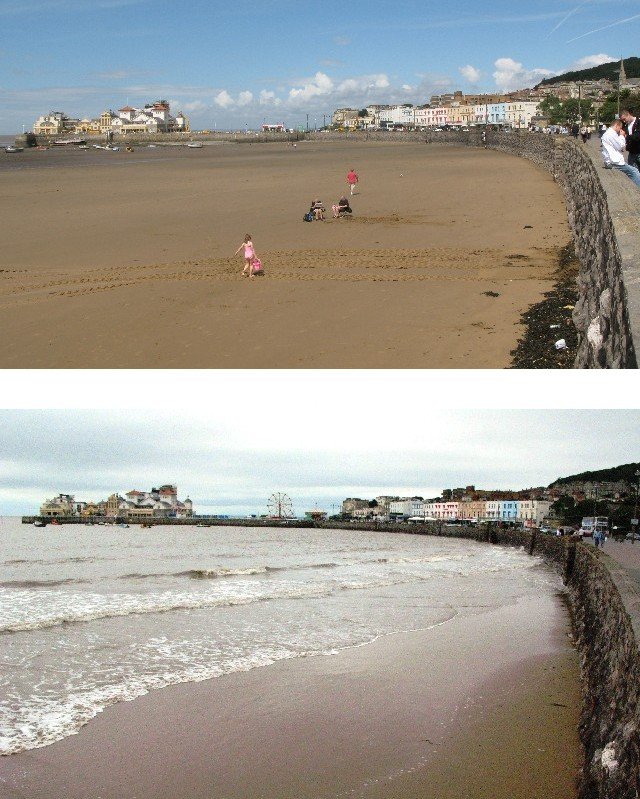
Low and high tides looking towards Knightstone Island

The mainly flat landscape of Weston is dominated to the north by Worlebury Hill (109 m (358 ft) above sea level). Bleadon Hill (176 m (577 ft) and Brean Down (97 m (318 ft)) forms its southern border. The River Axe flows into Weston Bay at Uphill, cutting Brean Down off from the town. Much of Worlebury Hill is wooded with some Ancient Woodland sites. The remains of Worlebury Camp hillfort are at its far western end.

The beach lies on the western edge of the town. The upper part is sandy, but the tidal rise and fall in the Severn Estuary and Bristol Channel can be as great as 14.5 m (48 ft), second only to Bay of Fundy in Eastern Canada. This tidal movement contributes to the deposition of natural mud in bays such as Weston. There has been concern about pollution levels from industrial areas in Wales and at the eastern end of the Bristol Channel; however this tends to be diluted by the Atlantic waters. There are measurable levels of chemical pollutants, and little is known about their effects. Of particular concern are the levels of cadmium and to a lesser degree residual pesticides and hydrocarbons.

Ellenborough Park, on the sea front near the town centre, is a Site of Special Scientific Interest due to the range of plant species found there.

A map of 1792 shows that the early village of Weston was located around the church and southwards along what is today's High Street as far as the end of what is now Meadow Street. The town has developed eastwards along and below Worlebury Hill to envelop the villages of Milton and Worle. It has also spread south behind the seafront and with housing estates at Bournville, Coronation and Oldmixon which leaves a small undeveloped strip around the village of Uphill.

== Climate ==
Along with the rest of South West England, Weston has a temperate climate which is generally wetter and milder than the rest of the country. The annual mean temperature is approximately 11 °C (52 °F). Seasonal temperature variation is less extreme than most of the United Kingdom because of the adjacent sea temperatures. The summer months of July and August are the warmest with mean daily maxima of approximately 22 °C (72 °F). In winter mean minimum temperatures of 2–3 °C (36–37 °F) are common.

The Azores high pressure affects the south-west of England in the summer, however convective cloud sometimes forms inland which reduces the number of hours of sunshine. Annual sunshine rates are slightly less than the regional average of 1,600 hours. There were 20 days without sun recorded at Yeovilton (the nearest weather station) in December 1998. Most of south-west England's rainfall in autumn and winter is caused by Atlantic depressions, which is when they are most active. A large proportion of the rainfall in the summer is caused by sun heating the ground leading to convection which results in showers and thunderstorms. Average rainfall is around 900 mm (35 in). About 8–15 days of snowfall is typical. November to March have the highest mean wind speeds, and June to August have the lightest winds. The predominant wind direction is from the south-west.

Climate data for Weston-super-Mare (1991–2020 normals, extremes 1959–1971, 1985–1994)
Month	Jan	Feb	Mar	Apr	May	Jun	Jul	Aug	Sep	Oct	Nov	Dec	Year
Record high °C (°F)	14.0 (57.2)	15.6 (60.1)	21.1 (70.0)	22.7 (72.9)	26.0 (78.8)	30.2 (86.4)	28.7 (83.7)	29.4 (84.9)	28.3 (82.9)	25.6 (78.1)	17.1 (62.8)	15.9 (60.6)	30.2 (86.4)
Mean daily maximum °C (°F)	8.5 (47.3)	9.3 (48.7)	11.2 (52.2)	14.0 (57.2)	17.2 (63.0)	20.1 (68.2)	21.9 (71.4)	21.5 (70.7)	19.4 (66.9)	15.1 (59.2)	11.8 (53.2)	8.9 (48.0)	14.9 (58.8)
Daily mean °C (°F)	5.7 (42.3)	6.0 (42.8)	7.6 (45.7)	9.7 (49.5)	12.6 (54.7)	15.8 (60.4)	17.7 (63.9)	17.3 (63.1)	15.1 (59.2)	11.7 (53.1)	8.5 (47.3)	5.9 (42.6)	11.1 (52.0)
Mean daily minimum °C (°F)	2.8 (37.0)	2.7 (36.9)	4.0 (39.2)	5.3 (41.5)	8.0 (46.4)	11.5 (52.7)	13.5 (56.3)	13.1 (55.6)	10.8 (51.4)	8.2 (46.8)	5.2 (41.4)	2.8 (37.0)	7.3 (45.1)
Record low °C (°F)	−11.4 (11.5)	−7.9 (17.8)	−9.0 (15.8)	−4.5 (23.9)	0.2 (32.4)	1.9 (35.4)	5.9 (42.6)	4.2 (39.6)	0.4 (32.7)	−4.0 (24.8)	−7.2 (19.0)	−8.1 (17.4)	−11.4 (11.5)
Average precipitation mm (inches)	93.4 (3.68)	63.4 (2.50)	53.9 (2.12)	60.2 (2.37)	53.7 (2.11)	65.7 (2.59)	73.3 (2.89)	77.9 (3.07)	91.2 (3.59)	96.3 (3.79)	112.3 (4.42)	98.7 (3.89)	940.0 (37.01)
Average precipitation days (≥ 1.0 mm)	13.5	10.1	11.2	10.5	9.1	9.4	10.3	9.9	9.3	13.5	13.5	13.4	133.8
Mean monthly sunshine hours	55.0	76.2	116.1	167.5	196.3	193.4	206.6	185.0	140.5	97.2	60.3	44.9	1,538.8
Source 1: Met Office (precipitation days 1981–2010)
Source 2: Starlings Roost Weather

== Demography ==
Weston's population started to grow in the 19th century. In 1811 it was just 163 people, in 1821 it was 738, and in 1831 it was 1,310. (Note: A book published in 1829 states there were around 250 houses in Weston.) By 1851 there were 4,033 people in the town and more than 8,000 by 1861. The town's expansion in the middle of the 20th century saw the population increase to more than 28,000 in 1931 and more than 40,000 in 1951 with further increases coming as new housing estates were built.

The United Kingdom Census 2021 recorded the population of Weston-super-Mare as 82,418 people. Of these

- 17,602 (21%) were aged over 65
- 73,147 (89%) were born in the United Kingdom
- 77,951 (95%) declared themselves as white

== Economy ==
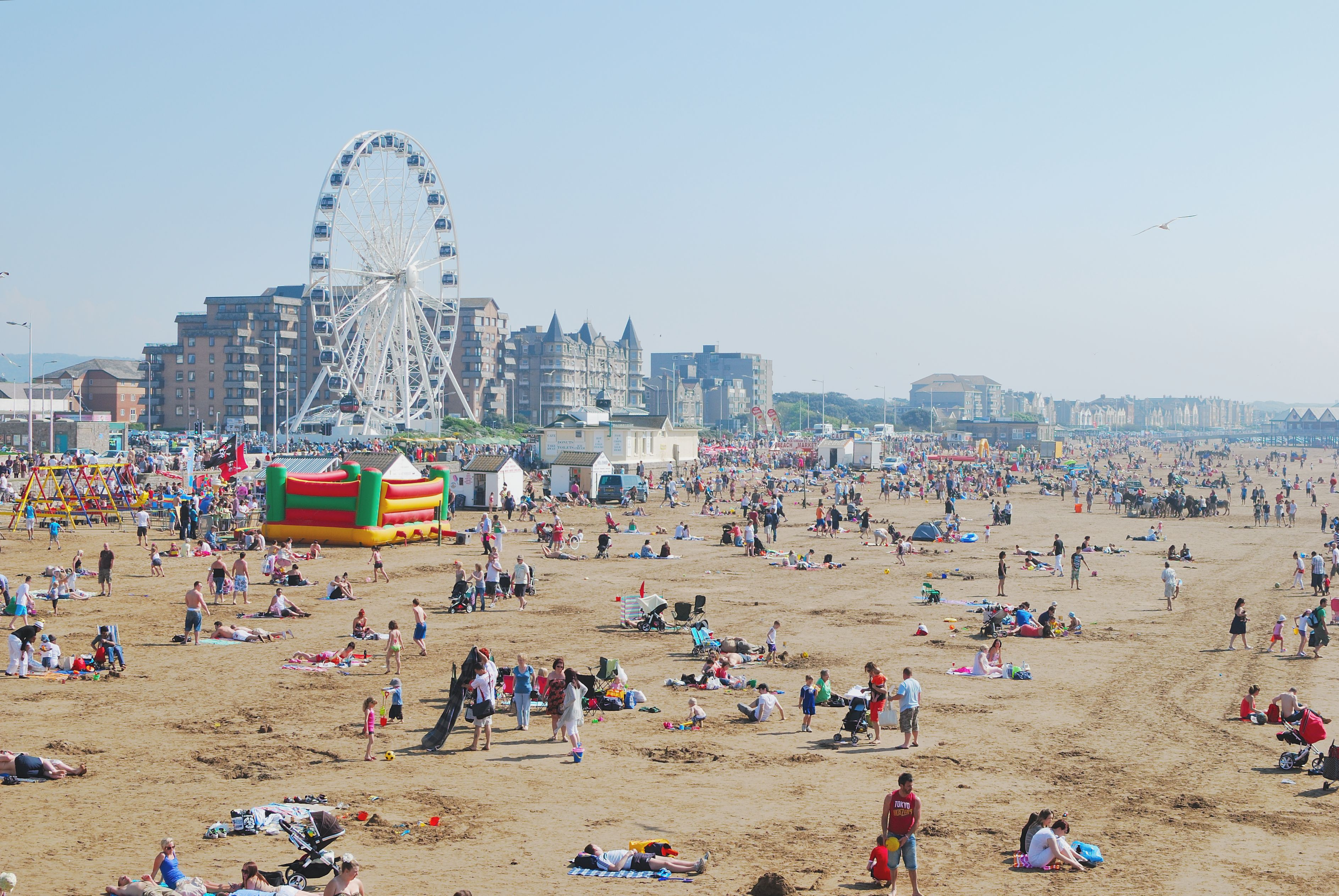
Weston-super-Mare beach seen from the Grand Pier, showing the popularity of the town as a tourist destination on the Easter bank holiday weekend (in 2011)

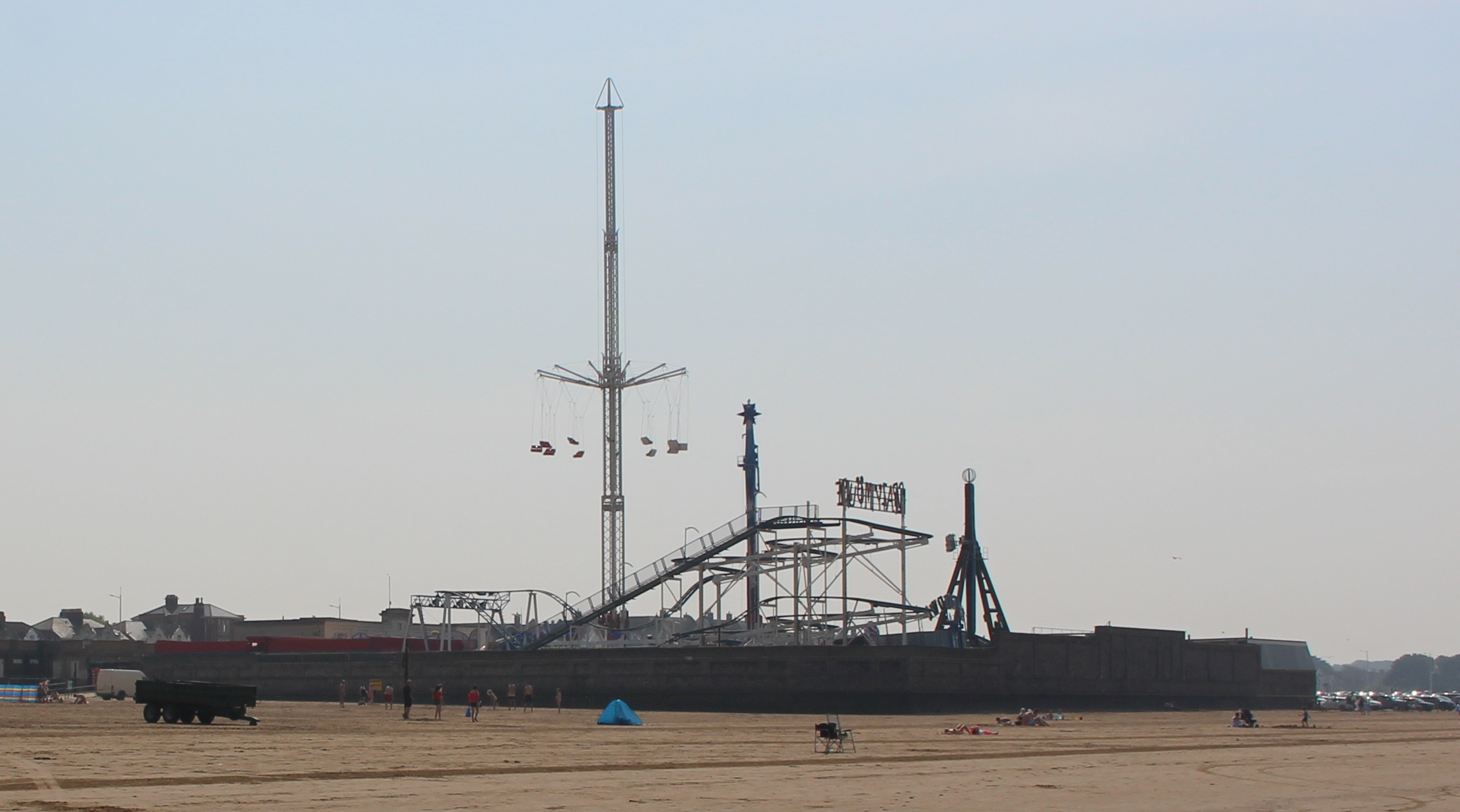
Funland, a seasonal amusement park hosted at the Tropicana

Since the 1970s, Weston has suffered a decline in popularity as a holiday destination, as have most British seaside resorts, due to the advent of cheap foreign holidays and the demise of the traditional "works holidays" of heavy and manufacturing industries elsewhere in UK. The town had become a centre of industries such as helicopter production, and maintenance at the GKN Westland factory until its closure in 2002, however the company still retains a design office under the name GKN Aerospace Engineering Services at the Winterstoke Road site. Road transport links were improved with the M5 motorway running close by, and the town now supports light industries and distribution depots, including Lidl's distribution centre for its southern based stores, and is also a dormitory town for Bristol. Vutrix, one of the largest semiconductor and video/audio distribution equipment companies in the television broadcasting industry, is based in the town. Two of the town's largest employers are the local council and Weston College, which has recently begun to offer university degrees as a secondary campus of Bath Spa University.

=== Tourism ===
Weston-super-Mare is a tourist destination, with its long sandy beach, Helicopter Museum, Weston Museum, Grand Pier and seasonal Wheel of Weston. A 2009 survey by Visit England placed the Grand Pier in the top ten free attractions in England. However, as of 2014, the pier charges for admission. On the Beach Lawns was a miniature railway operated by steam and diesel locomotives, which closed in 2012. The Paddle Steamer Waverley and MV Balmoral offer day trips from Knightstone Island to various destinations along the Bristol Channel and Severn estuary.

Since the 1970s the number of visitors staying for several nights in the town has decreased, but the numbers of day visitors has increased. In 1995 there were 4 million visitors but by 2005 this had risen to 5.3 million. In 2007 69% of visitors to the resort were day visitors, compared to 58% in 2005. The 2005 survey showed that day visitors stay in Weston-super-Mare for an average of six hours whilst overnight visitors stay for an average of five nights. The largest percentage of visitors (22%) were from the West Midlands. Weston was found to attract two distinct groups: "grey tourists" over the age of 60 and families with young children.

The Art Deco Tropicana, once a very popular lido on the beach, suffered years of neglect before closing to the public in 2000, and despite a number of attempts to reopen it, permission was given to demolish it in 2012. However, the complex reopened in 2015 and now serves as an events space, primarily hosting a seasonal amusement park and ice rink.

In July 2011, North Somerset Council gave planning approval to the £50 million Leisure Dome, a 210-metre (690 ft) indoor ski slope to be built on the site of RAF Locking. It was planned to include a 40-metre (130 ft) climbing wall, a vertical wind tunnel for indoor skydiving, indoor surfing, a BMX track, a health and fitness club, and a number of shops and restaurants. The ski slope was to be the longest in the United Kingdom. In 2015 the future of the project was in doubt because of the need for additional funding, and no mention of the LeisureDome proposals appear on the information provided by St. Modwen Properties, the developers about their plans for Locking Parklands as the site is now known.

'International HeliDays', in association with The Helicopter Museum, are staged at the beach lawns over a long weekend around the end of July, when up to 75 helicopters from Europe fly in for a static display. There are frequent Helicopter Air Experience flights from the Museum heliport. There is also an annual display by the Red Arrows.

Weston Bike Nights are motorcycle meetings on the Promenade each Thursday during the summer. They are organised by The Royal British Legion Riders Branch to raise money for the Poppy Appeal.

== Transport ==
=== Road ===
The early route into Weston was along the south side of Worlebury Hill on what became Bristol Road. As the national road network developed, Locking Road became part of the A370 road. This links Weston with Bristol and also the A38 road to the south. The M5 motorway between Birmingham and Exeter was completed in 1973 and includes a junction for Weston-super-Mare near Worle. A link road to the town centre was built later and is now the designated route of the A370. The A371 road runs east through Locking to Wells and Wincanton.

=== Rail ===
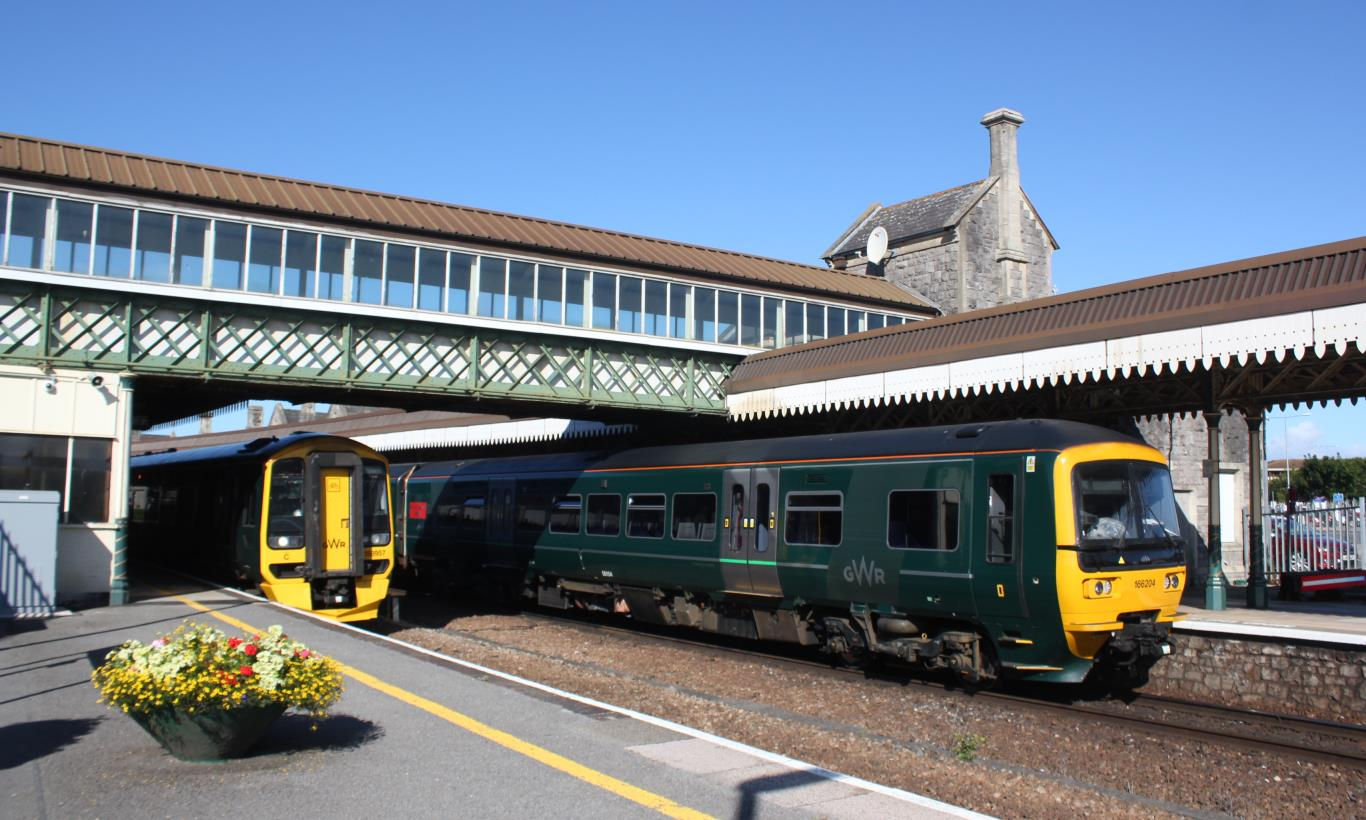
Weston-super-Mare railway station

The first Weston-super-Mare railway station opened on 14 June 1841, the terminus of a short branch line from Weston Junction which was where Hutton Moor Lane crosses the railway. The present station opened on 1 March 1881 along with a new line which allowed trains to run through the town.

The weekday daytime in 2026 has Great Western Railway trains approximately every hour each way between Weston-super-Mare and:

- Cardiff Central via Bristol Temple Meads
- Avonmouth or Severn Beach via Bristol Temple Meads
- Taunton (many of which continue to Exeter St Davids or Penzance).

There are less frequent Great Western Railway services via Bristol Temple Meads to Bath Spa and London Paddington. There are also CrossCountry services once each day to Manchester Piccadilly via Bristol Temple Meads, and to Paignton via Taunton.

Worle railway station is served by most trains to and from Weston-super-Mare. Weston Milton railway station is served by the Avonmouth/Severn Beach service and a few trains on the Cardiff and London routes.

=== Bus ===
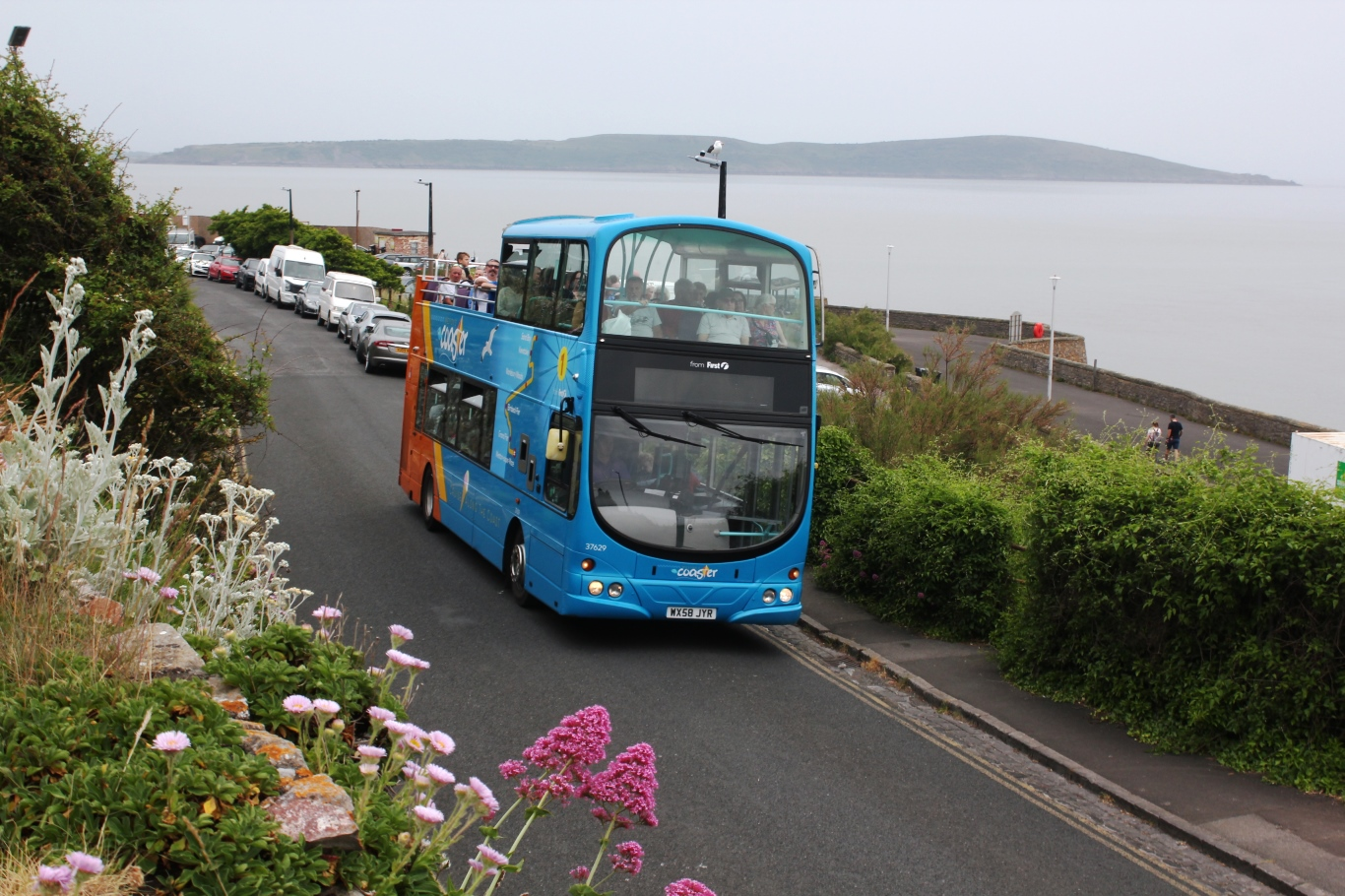
An open top bus near Birnbeck Pier

Weston used to have a bus station on Beach Road. When it opened in 1928 it was the only bus station in the area. It closed in 1987, since when buses have departed from various streets including on the sea front. Most services now call at the bus interchange (also known as the 'bus hub') that opened in 2022 on Regent Street adjacent to Tesco.

Most local services are provided by First West of England. These include buses to Bristol, Wells and Burnham-on-Sea as well as town routes. The service to Sand Bay is sometimes operated by an open top bus. WESTlink provides a demand-responsive minibus service for the area.

Long-distance coach services are operated by National Express and FlixBus from the bus interchange; FlixBus also calls at Worle railway station.

=== Air ===
Weston Airfield opened in 1936 and was the second busiest airfield in the country before World War II. It closed in 1978.

The nearest operational airport to Weston is now Bristol Airport, located 15 miles (24 km) away at Lulsgate. The A3 'Weston Airport Flyer' bus links the town and airport.

== Education ==
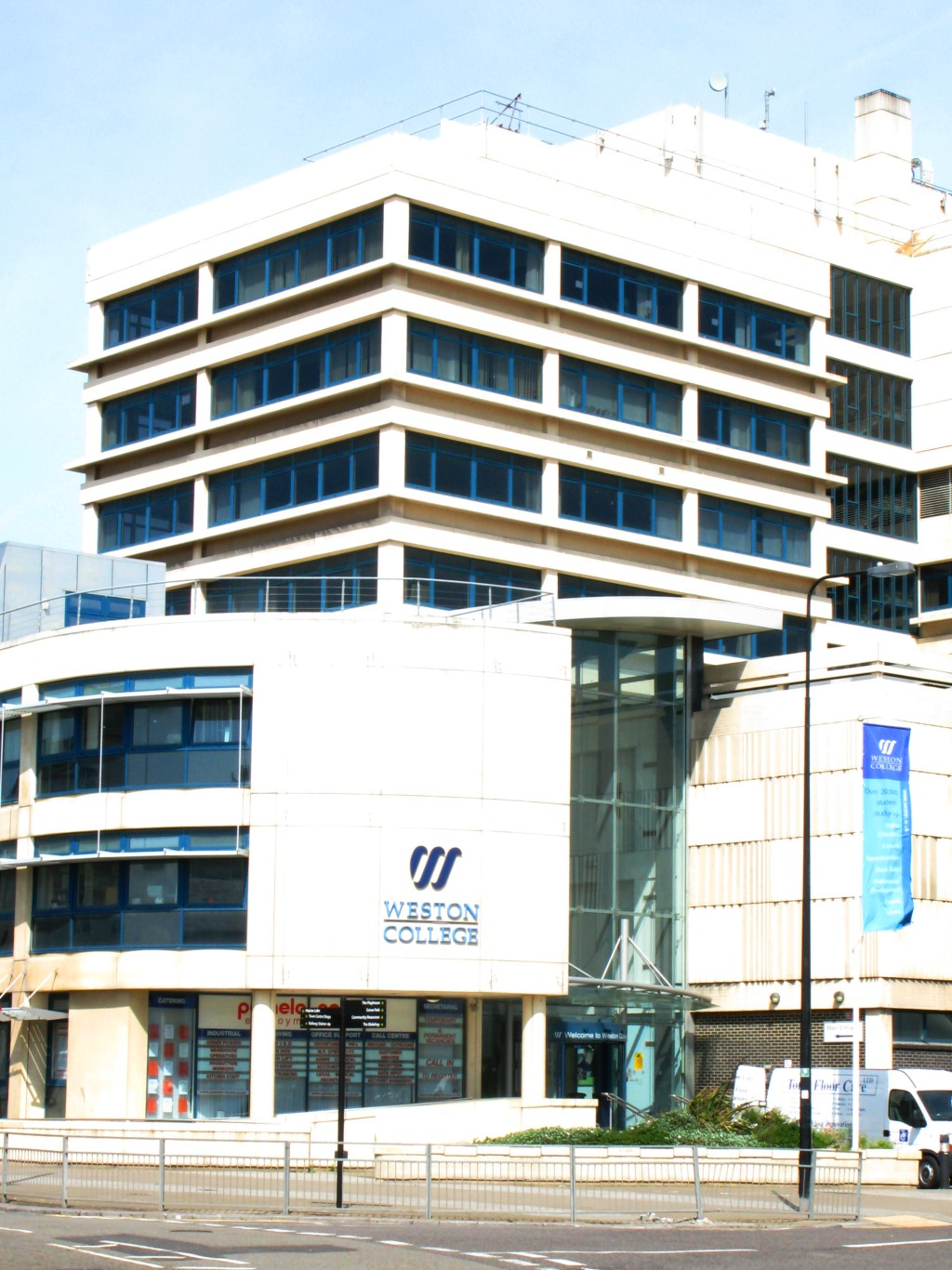
Weston College, Knightstone Campus

Churches and charities provided the first schools for poorer families but many private boarding schools were set up as Weston was considered a healthy location for children. These included The College on the sea front (which was sold in the 1880s and enlarged to become the Grand Atlantic Hotel), Stanmore School in the Royal Crescent, Winthorpe in Wilton Gardens, Burton House in Walliscote Road, and Etonhurst at Ellenborough Park. The Sisters of La Retraite opened a Catholic school in 1899 and it moved to South Road in 1907 where it remained until 1971. St Peter's started in Highbury House in 1882 and moved a short distance to the Shrubbery when a new school was built in 1906. This operated until 1970. Roald Dahl was a boarder from 1925; John Cleese was a day pupil from 1948 and later returned as a teacher.

The church schools resisted the formation of a School Board in the 1870s but one was finally established in 1893. The first Board School was provided in Walliscote Road near the Town Hall in 1893, and a second in Locking Road in 1900. Responsibility for education was transferred to Somerset County Council in 1903.

Somerset adopted comprehensive secondary education in 1971. Worle County Secondary School moved into a new building as Worle Comprehensive (now Worle Community School Academy), the first purpose-built comprehensive school in Somerset. Walliscote Boys' School and Walliscote Girls' School combined to become Wyvern Comprehensive (now the Hans Price Academy) which covered the centre of the town, and the Grammar School became Broadoak Comprehensive (now Broadoak Academy) at the south end of the town. Priory Community School was opened later amid the housing expansion around Worle.

The National School in Lower Church Road offered the town's first higher education classes in 1873. The School of Art later moved into adjacent premises, having opened in the Boulevard in 1880. The National School was replaced by today's main college building in 1970 which was extended in 1998. Satellite college campuses have been situated in other parts of the town at various times.

== Culture ==
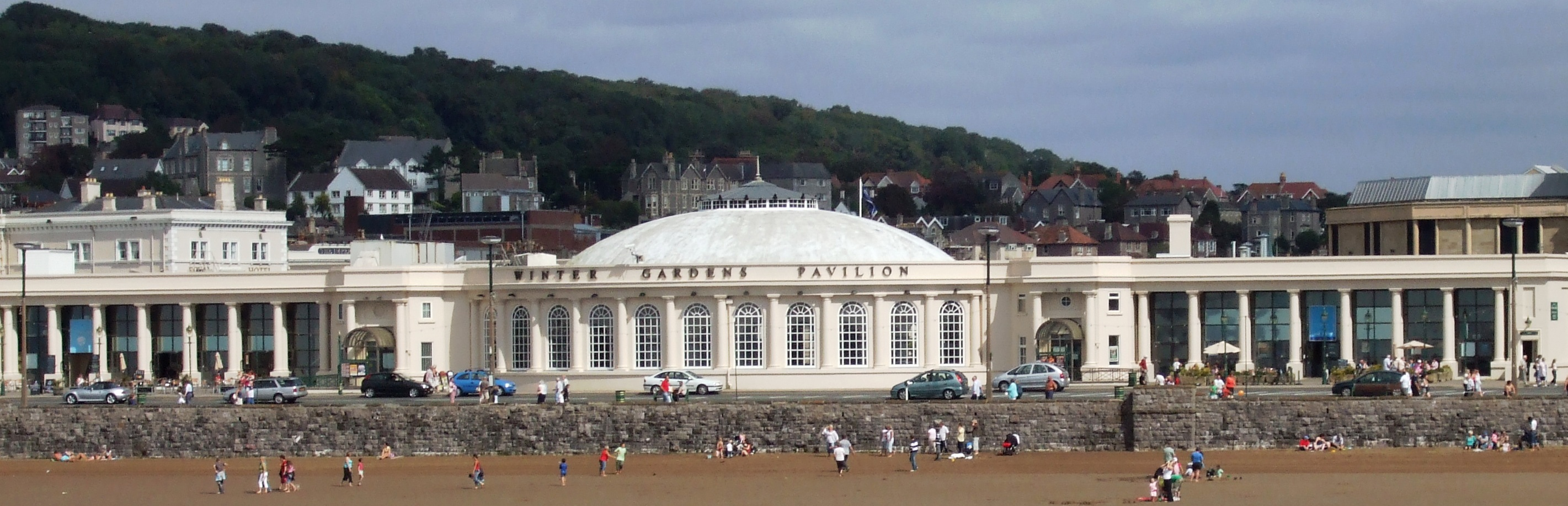
The Winter Gardens

The Playhouse theatre is in High Street near Grove Park. It opened in 1946 but burnt down in 1964; the current building dates from 1969. The Winter Gardens Pavilion opened on the seafront in 1927 for shows but now also hosts exhibitions and conferences in an extension. The Blakehay is a small concert hall and exhibition space in Wadham Street near The Playhouse. It is housed in a former Baptist church and managed by Weston-super-Mare Civic Society. All Saints Church hosts concerts, has been used for recording, for example by the Emerald Ensemble, and has featured on BBC TV's Songs of Praise.

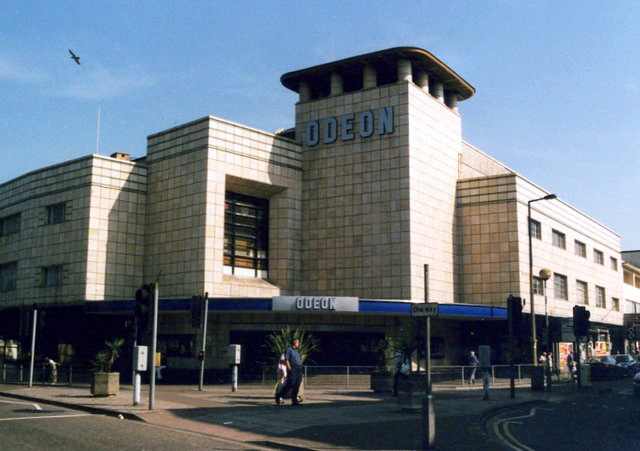
Plaza Cinema

The Plaza Cinema was opened as the Odeon in 1935. It is a Grade II listed in art deco. It houses the only Compton theatre pipe organ in an Odeon cinema outside London, and is one of only two working theatre organs left in the country still performing in their original location in commercially operating cinemas.

The Weston Arts Festival takes place each year during September and October using local venues including the Blakehay Theatre, Playhouse, All Saints, and galleries and offering a wide range of cultural events.

Weston has hosted Weston Wallz since 2021. This is a street art programme curated by the Upfest team and has resulted in more than 75 murals across the town.

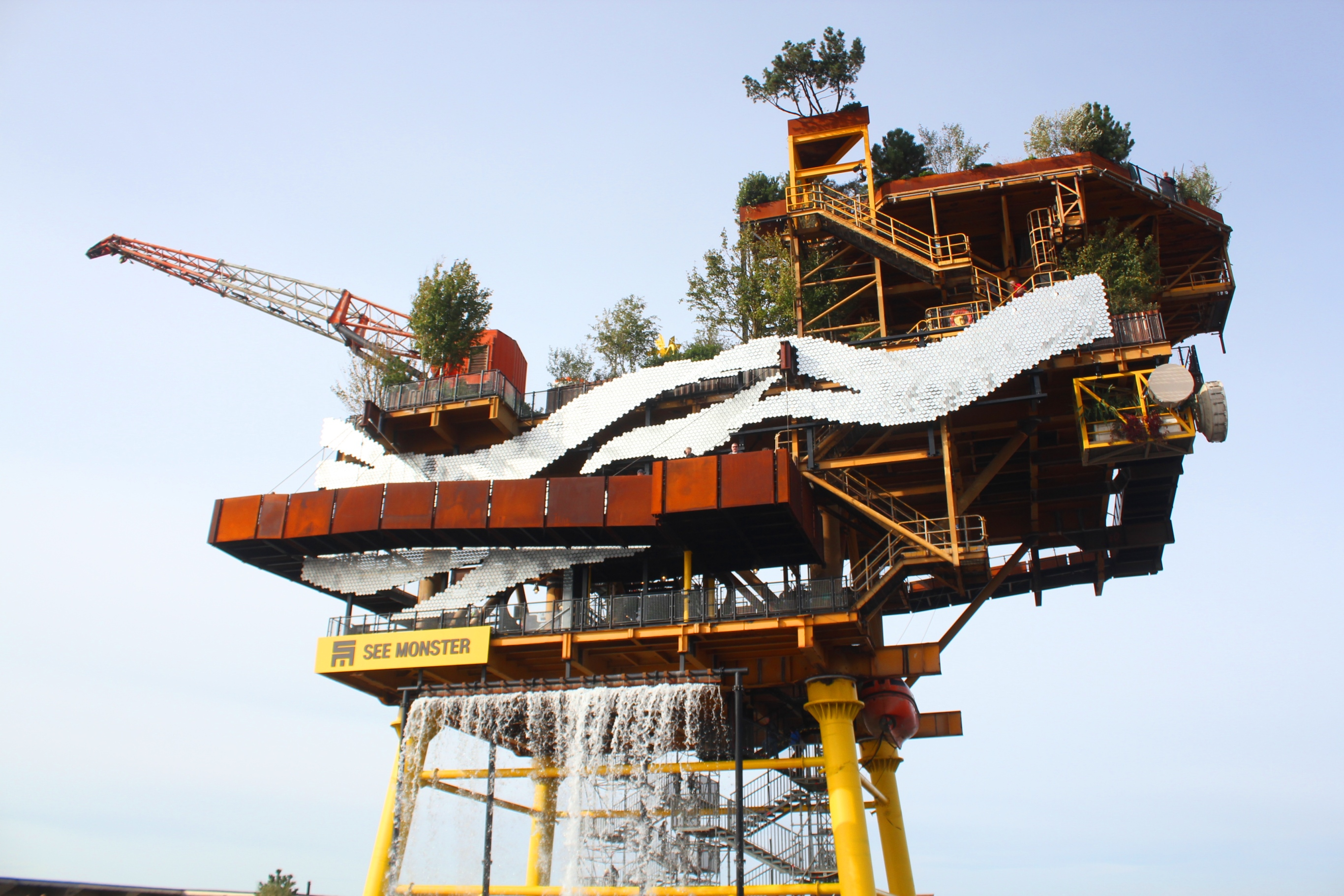
See Monster

The Tropicana was used by the artist Banksy in August 2015 for a temporary art installation named Dismaland. In 2022 it was used for another temporary art installation when a retired gas platform was repurposed as the See Monster. It was part of the national Unboxed: Creativity in the UK art festival.

The beach and Beach Lawns are used for many events such as the Dairy Show. The Radio 1 Roadshow often visited the town, bringing disc jockeys such as Tony Blackburn and pop stars such as Jason Donovan. The T4 on the Beach concert was hosted annually from 2006 until 2012, by Channel 4 youth programme T4. Well known bands and singers perform four or fewer of their hits. However, artists would have to organise a lip sync performance (in which the vocals are mimed) in case they were unable to sing live as the event is being produced for live TV broadcast. Each summer the beach is also used as the venue for the Weston-super-Mare Sand Sculpture Festival.

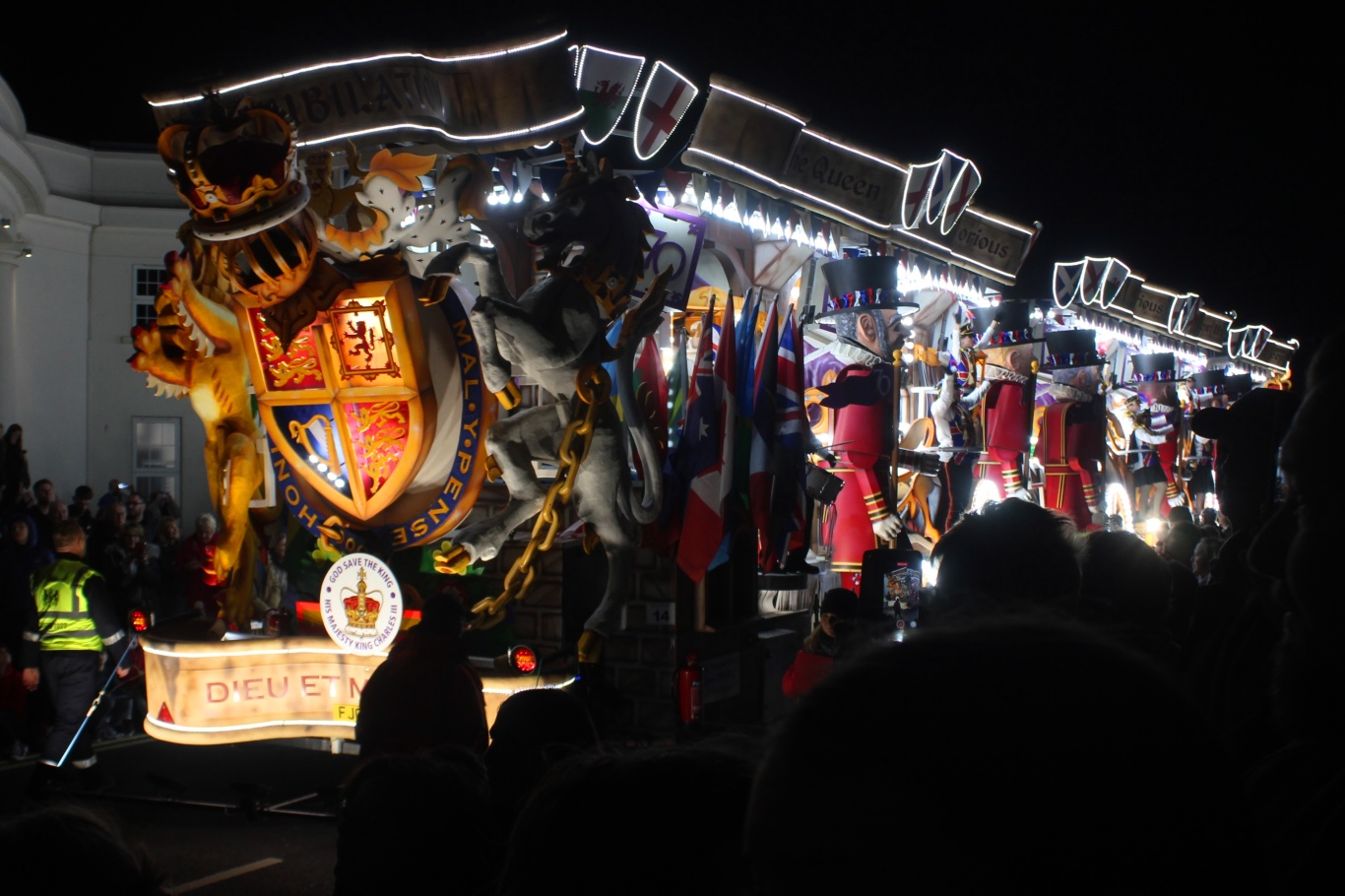
An illuminated cart at Weston-super-Mare Carnival 2022 which had been used in the Queens Platinum Jubilee Pageant Parade in London and built by local Carnival Clubs.

Weston is one of the towns in the November Somerset Guy Fawkes carnival circuit. A large number of brightly illuminated 'carts' parade through the streets on an evening in November, attracting thousands of locals and visitors. The first November carnival was in 1891 although other illuminated events had taken place since 1869. Daylight summer carnivals were also held during the twentieth century.

Weston has been twinned with Hildesheim in Germany since 1983.

=== Cultural references ===
Albert Ketèlbey wrote amusical 'tone picture', In a Camp of the Ancient Britons, in 1925 after a visit to Worlebury Camp while playing at the Knightstone Theatre the previous year. Fred C. Brooks published a song called Weston in 1928. Its three verses mentions the Burgess Band which played in the town. Eric Gilbert composed a 15-minute orchestral piece, A Picture of Weston-super-Mare during a visit to the town in 1946. Sunny Weston-super-Mare was released as a single by local band The Wurzels in 1988.

French poet Valery Larbaud (1881–1957) wrote a poem, Weston-super-Mare Midi, concerning a rainy day. Another account of a rain storm in Weston is in Bill Bryson's Notes from a Small Island which recounts a one-night stay during his tour around the country. Laurie Lee recalled a childhood visit to Weston in his 159 book Cider with Rosie: "We saw a vast blue sky and an infinity of mud... and we all went on the pier."

The last scenes of The Remains of the Day, a James Ivory film of 1993, were shot at locations in the town including the Grand Pier and the Winter Gardens.

Find the Lady, an episode of the BBC's 1979 Shoestring detective series, was largely filmed in Weston using Birnbeck Pier and other locations. Guest stars for the episode were Toyah Willcox and Christopher Biggins. Some scenes purporting to be Ramsgate in the BBC's 1995 version of Pride and Prejudice were filmed in Weston with Steep Holm visible in the background. The 2011–2013 Sky1 television comedy series The Café was filmed in Weston-super-Mare. It was co-written by Michelle Terry who was born in the town. BBC comedy drama The Outlaws included a storyline which saw one of the central characters opening a café on the seafront.

The cover of Oasis's 1995 single Roll With It features a photograph taken on Weston beach with the band in front of the Grand Pier.

=== Media ===
The town's weekly newspaper is The Weston & Somerset Mercury, which has been serving the population since 1843. It is now owned by publishing company Archant.

Local television news programmes are BBC Points West and ITV News West Country.

Weston Super Television was an on-line community television channel set up in 2011. Its volunteers make and present studio programmes, including interviews with local councillors, musicians and community leaders, as well as filming local events in and around the town.

== Landmarks ==
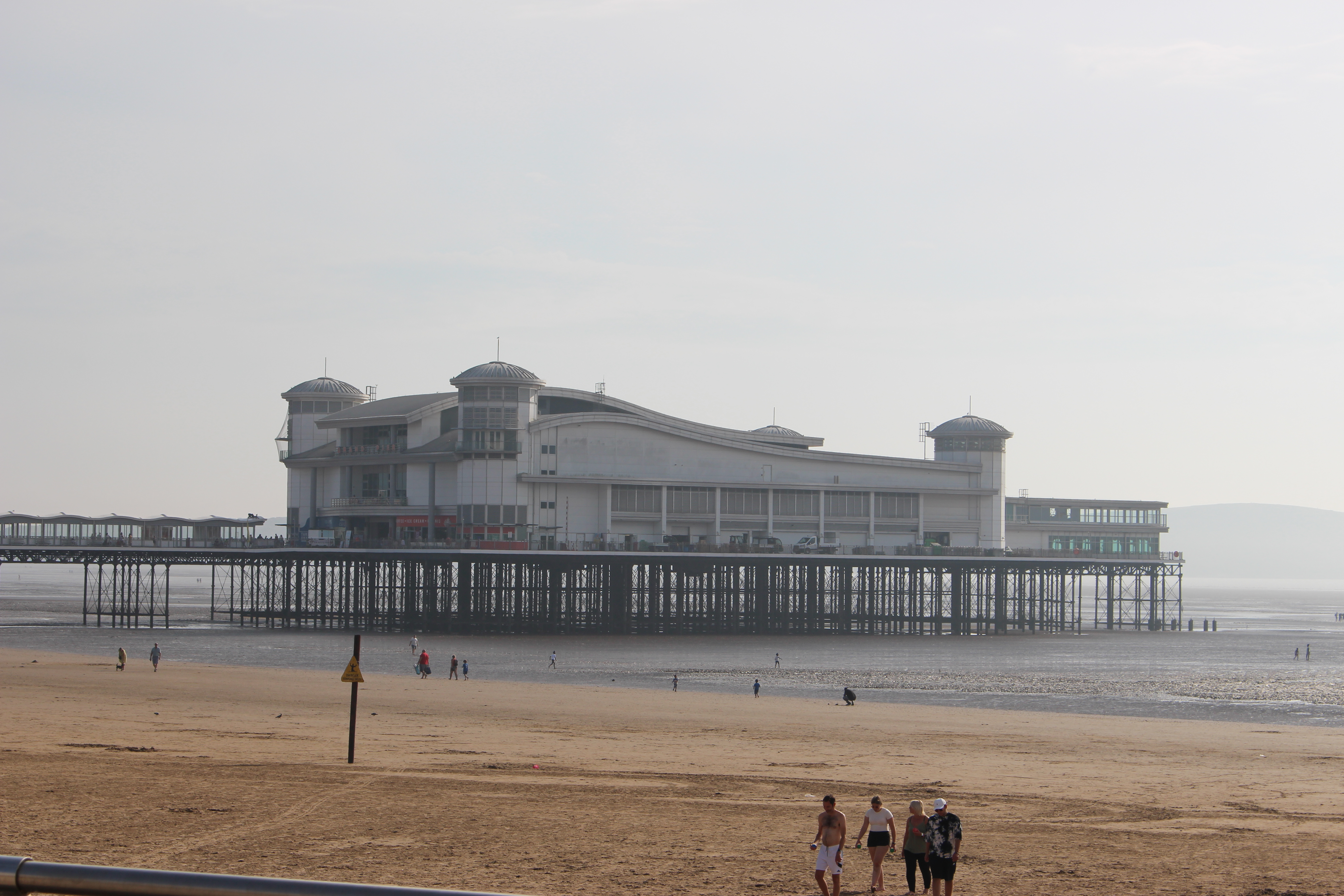
The Grand Pier

The Grand Pier is one of the most popular tourist attractions in the town. It houses funfair style attractions, a go-kart track, cafes, a fudge factory, and a host of arcade games, and underwent a £34 million re-development after a fire in 2008 destroyed the main pavilion. After a harsh winter which delayed progress, the new pier pavilion reopened on 23 October 2010.

Weston's first pier, Birnbeck Pier opened in 1867 but closed in 1994. The old Weston-super-Mare Lifeboat Station can be seen on the island with its 100 ft (30 m) slipway. A third pier was opened near the Tropicana in 1995 for a Sea Life aquarium.

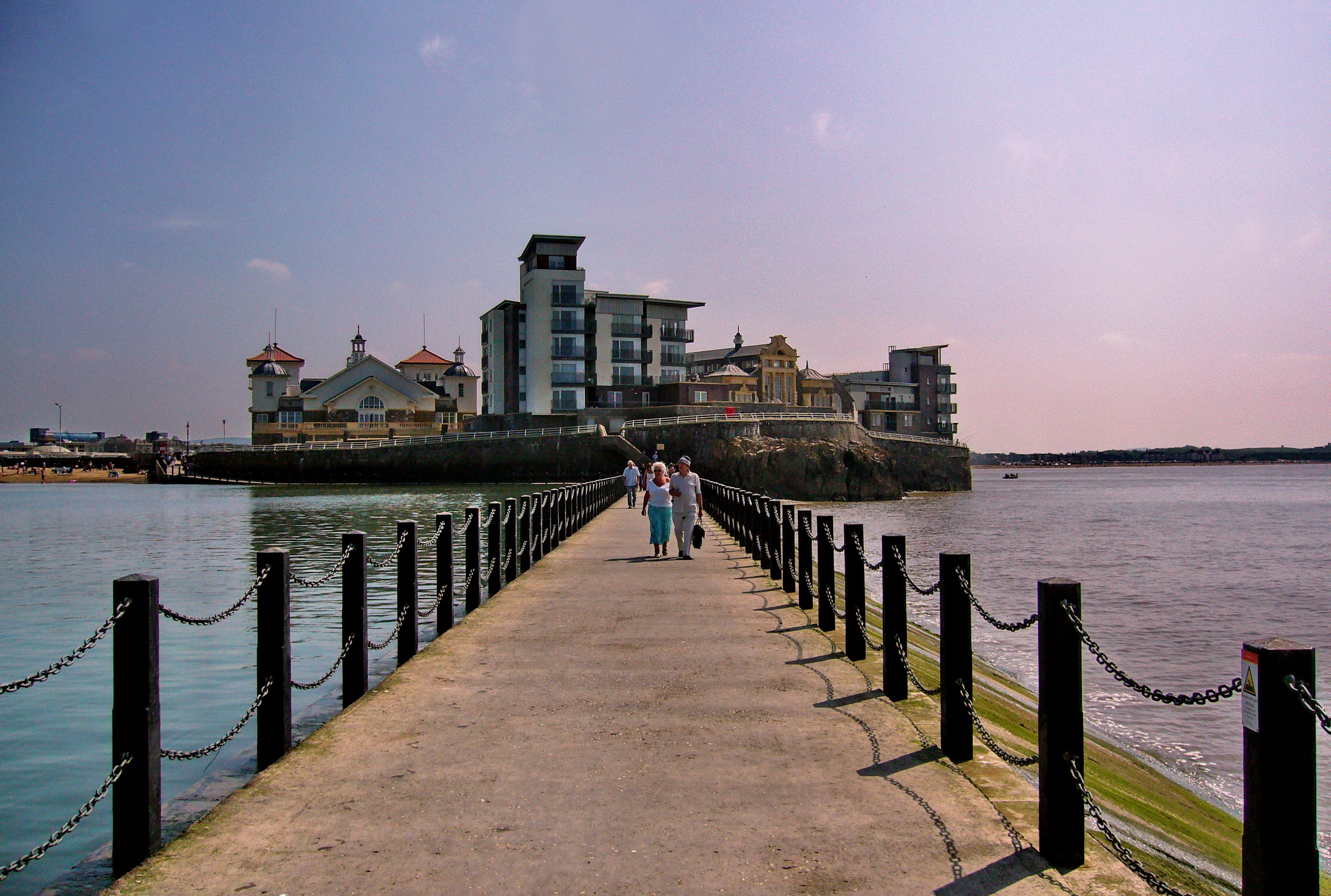
Knightstone Island, with the Marine Lake to the left. The causeway is submerged during very high tides.

Knightstone Island was developed as a sea water spa in 1820. It was purchased by the physician Edward Long Fox in 1830, linked to the mainland by a causeway and expanded with a theatre, swimming pool and sauna. After these facilities were closed, it was redeveloped with luxury apartments and commercial outlets but this was done with regard to its listed building status. Historic ships Waverley and Balmoral call at Knightsone occasionally for excursions to Steep Holm and Flat Holm islands as well as short trips around Weston Bay.

The Tropicana, an outdoor swimming pool, opened in 1937 but closed in 2000. Since then it has been used for temporary events and installation art such as Dismaland in 2015 and See Monster in 2022.

The War Memorial in Grove Park, containing a sculpture by Alfred Drury, was unveiled in 1922, It contains the names of 402 men from the area who fell in the First World War with additions by Walter Cave for the Second World War. It consists of a winged allegorical figure of Victory holding an olive branch, which stands on an octagonal column. The memorial is a grade II listed building.

== Architecture ==
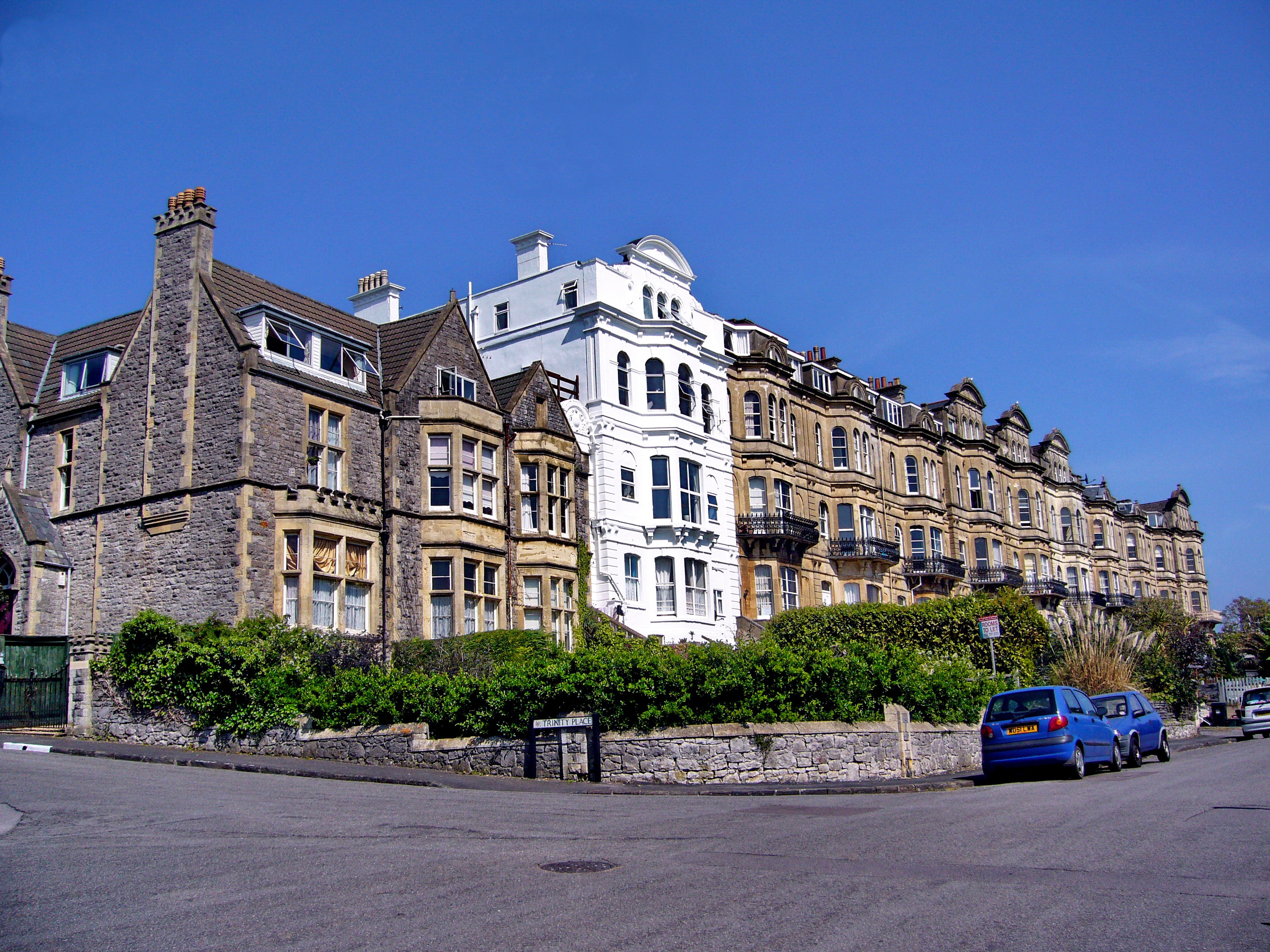
Victorian architecture typical of the town

Much of the character of the buildings in the old town derives from the use of local stone. This was quarried at Uphill and the town quarry on Queens Road along with other places along Worlebury Hill. Brick, tiles and ornamental work was produced by the Royal Pottery near Locking Road and at another pottery in Uphill. The distinctive style of many 19th-century buildings was pioneered by local architect Hans Price (1835–1912). Examples of his work include the Town Hall, the Mercury Office, the Constitutional Club (originally the Lodge of St Kew), villas and numerous other domestic dwellings.

The Odeon Cinema by Thomas Cecil Howitt is notable for fully retaining many Art Deco features both internally and externally, and retaining its original theatre organ, a Compton from 1935. It is believed to be the only cinema organ in the West Country left working in its original location and is still in regular use.

== Religious sites ==
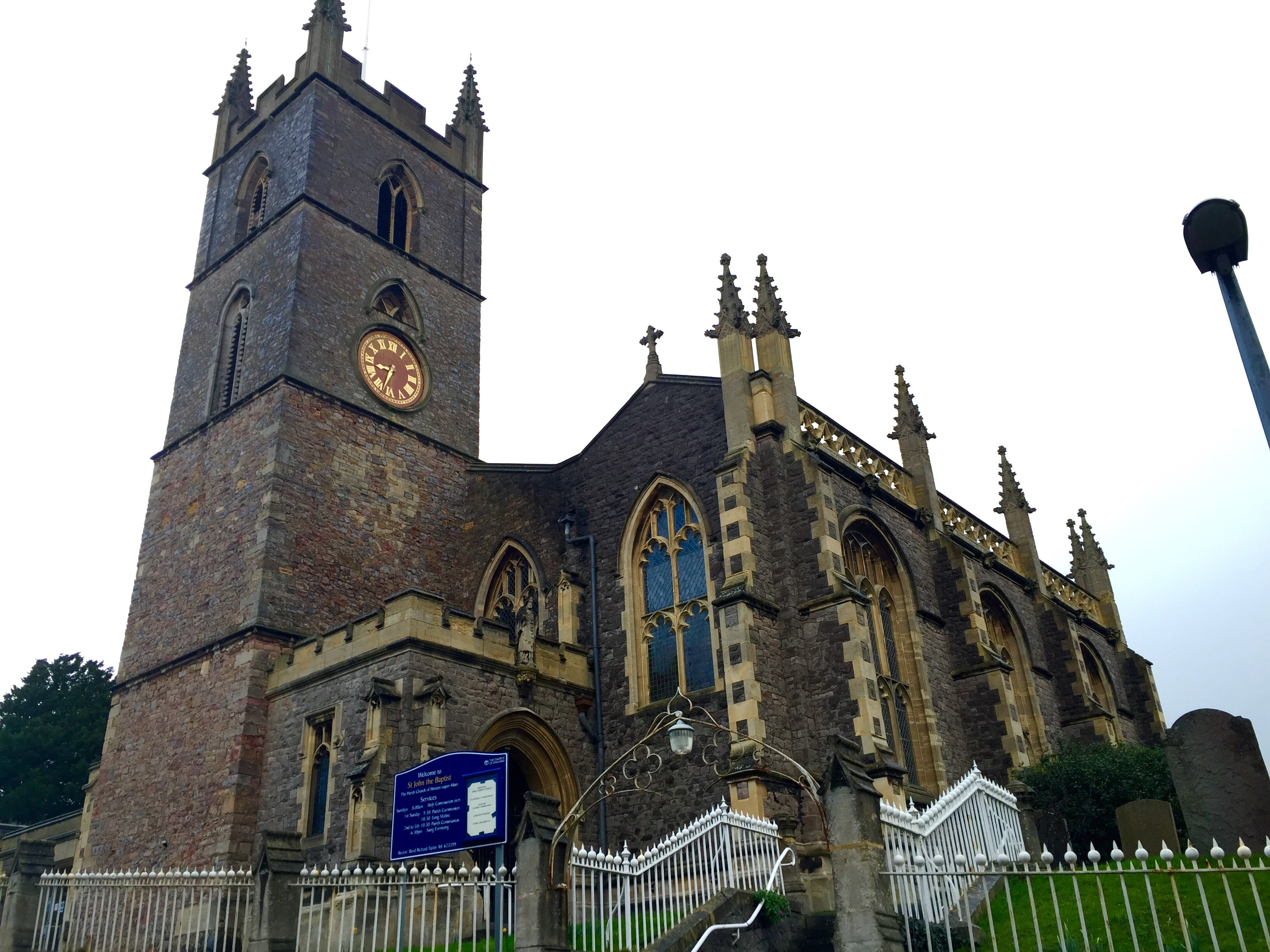
St John's church

Most of the town's churches and chapels are neo-Gothic 19th century structures. The Medieval village church of St John the Baptist was completely demolished in 1824 to make way for a new and larger place of worship. The Catholic St Joseph's Church was built in 1858 by Charles F. Hansom and extended in 1893 by Alexander Scoles.

All Saints Church was built between 1898 and 1902 to a design by George Frederick Bodley and completed by his pupil F. C. Eden in the 14th century style so favoured by Bodley. It is a Grade II* listed building. Holy Trinity Church, designed by H Lloyd and opened in 1861, is also Grade II*.

There is a Greek Orthodox Church of St Andrew the Apostle in Grove Road, Milton. Victoria Methodist Church was built in 1935–36 to replace an earlier church of 1899–1900, which was destroyed by fire in 1934.

== Sport ==
Football team Weston-super-Mare A.F.C. play in the National League South at the purpose-built Woodspring Stadium, which opened in August 2004.

There are two rugby clubs in the town; Weston-super-Mare RFC, formed in 1875, and Hornets RFC, formed in 1962.

Somerset County Cricket Club played first class and one-day matches for one week a season on a pitch prepared at Clarence Park, near the sea front. This began in 1914 and continued until the last "festival" in 1996. Weston-super-Mare Cricket Club play at Devonshire Park Ground.

The town is well known amongst motocross enthusiasts for staging the Weston Beach Race every autumn. In addition, races are also held for youth riders, sidecarcross riders and quad bike competitors.

== Notable people ==
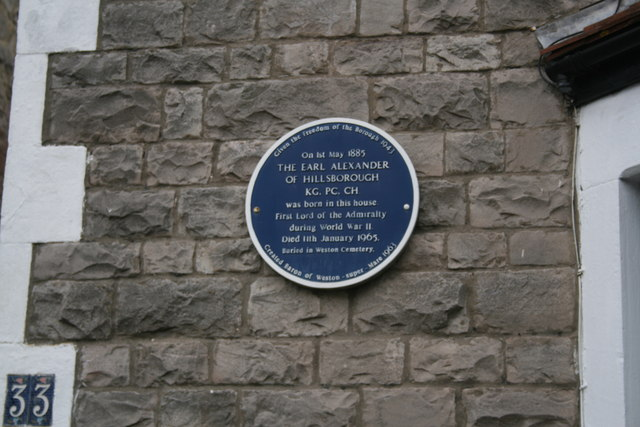
Blue plaque marking the birthplace of A. V. Alexander, 1st Earl Alexander of Hillsborough

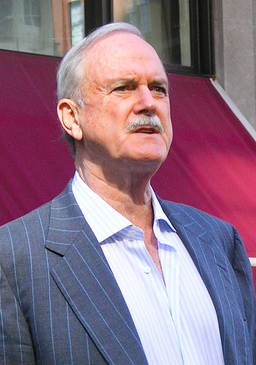
John Cleese, 2008

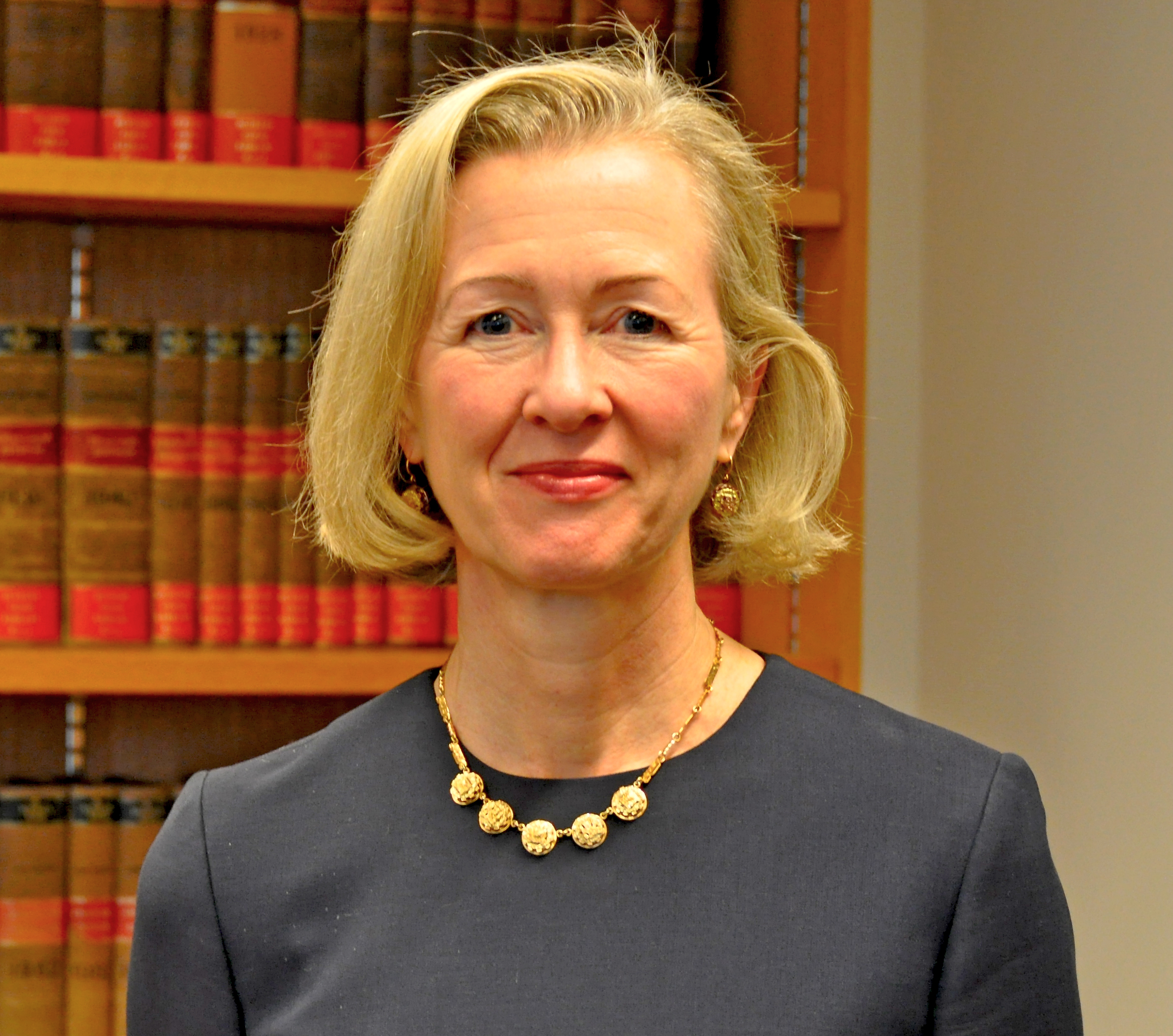
Lady Justice Cockerill, 2022

Notable current and former residents of the town include:

- John Oldmixon (1673–1742): historian; born in Oldmixon
- Hans Price: (1835–1912) architect; responsible for much of the Victorian architecture which gives the town its distinctive character
- Cecil Carus-Wilson (1857–1934), Mayor of Twickenham and amateur geologist who studied the acoustic properties of rocks.
- Augustus Edward Hough Love (1863–1940), mathematical physicist famous for research on elasticity, wrote [EB1911] article.
- Sir William Tatem (1868–1942), ship- and racehorse-owner, died during a local air raid in 1942
- Alfred Leete (1882–1933), graphic artist of the Lord Kitchener Wants You poster, studied and buried locally.
- Henry Edwards (1882–1952), film actor, director and producer
- Sir Arthur Eddington (1882–1944), an important astrophysicist, grew up in the town
- A. V. Alexander, 1st Earl Alexander of Hillsborough (1885–1965), Minister of Defence in the Attlee government, raised in Weston-super-Mare
- Arthur Millier (1893–1975), an American painter, etcher, printmaker and art critic.
- Bob Hope (1903–2003), comedian and actor, lived there as a child
- Roald Dahl (1916–1990), Welsh children's author, attended St Peter's School, 1925–1929.
- Deborah Kerr (1921–2007), actress, lived in the town as a child and first performed on stage here.
- John Polkinghorne (1930–2021), particle physicist and theologian
- Brian Cotter, Baron Cotter (1936–2023), politician. MP for Weston-super-Mare from 1997 to 2005.
- John Cleese (born 1939), actor and member of Monty Python
- Daphne Fowler (born 1939), game show champion, lives locally.
- Jeffrey Archer (1940–2026), author, politician and convicted perjurer, grew up locally
- Mandy Miller (born 1944), child actress who sang "Nellie the Elephant"
- Ritchie Blackmore (born 1945), guitarist and co-founder of Deep Purple and Rainbow.
- Nicola Bradbury (born 1951), a literary critic, lecturer, editor and author.
- Peter Christopherson (1955–2010), musician, co-founder of Throbbing Gristle and Psychic TV.
- Jill Dando (1961–1999), murdered broadcaster and journalist, after whom the sixth form centre at Weston College and a garden in Grove Park are named
- John Balance (1962–2004), musician, co-founder of Psychic TV and of Coil (band)
- Rupert Graves (born 1963), film, TV and theatre actor.
- Wendy Darke (born 1965) TV producer and marine biologist, the first woman to head the BBC Studios Natural History Unit.
- Con O'Neill (born 1966), actor, known for his performances in Musical theatre
- Dame Sara Cockerill (born 1968), a British Lady Justice of Appeal and Deputy Head of Civil Justice
- Michelle Terry (born 1979), actress and writer, grew up locally.
- Aaron Allard-Morgan (born 1980), winner of Big Brother 2011 (UK)

=== Sports people ===
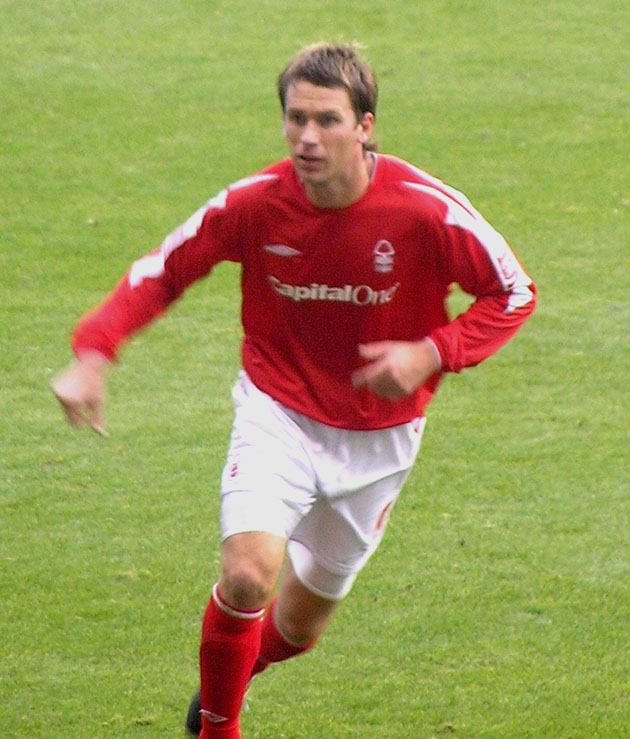
Gareth Taylor, 2006

- Paulo Radmilovic (1886–1968), water polo player and team gold medallist at the 1908 Summer Olympics, also swam for Weston-super-Mare swimming and water polo clubs
- Bill Andrews (1908–1989), cricketer who played 231 First-class cricket games for Somerset.
- Phil Slocombe (born 1954), cricketer who played 139 First-class cricket matches for Somerset.
- Gareth Taylor (born 1973), footballer, played 575 games and 15 for Wales and football manager
- Jon Bass (born 1976), former footballer, played 210 games.
- Peter Trego (born 1981), cricketer, played 223 First-class cricket games.
- Richard Kingscote (born 1986), a flat racing jockey who won the 2022 Epsom Derby.
- Dayle Grubb (born 1991), footballer, played over 500 games including 420 with Weston-super-Mare.
- Johnny Williams, (born 1996) rugby union player, played about 100 games and 9 for Wales.
- Curtis Langdon (born 1997), rugby player, played 190 games and 4 for England

== See also ==
- Grade II* listed buildings in North Somerset
