= The Blakehay Theatre, Weston-super-Mare =

The Blakehay Theatre
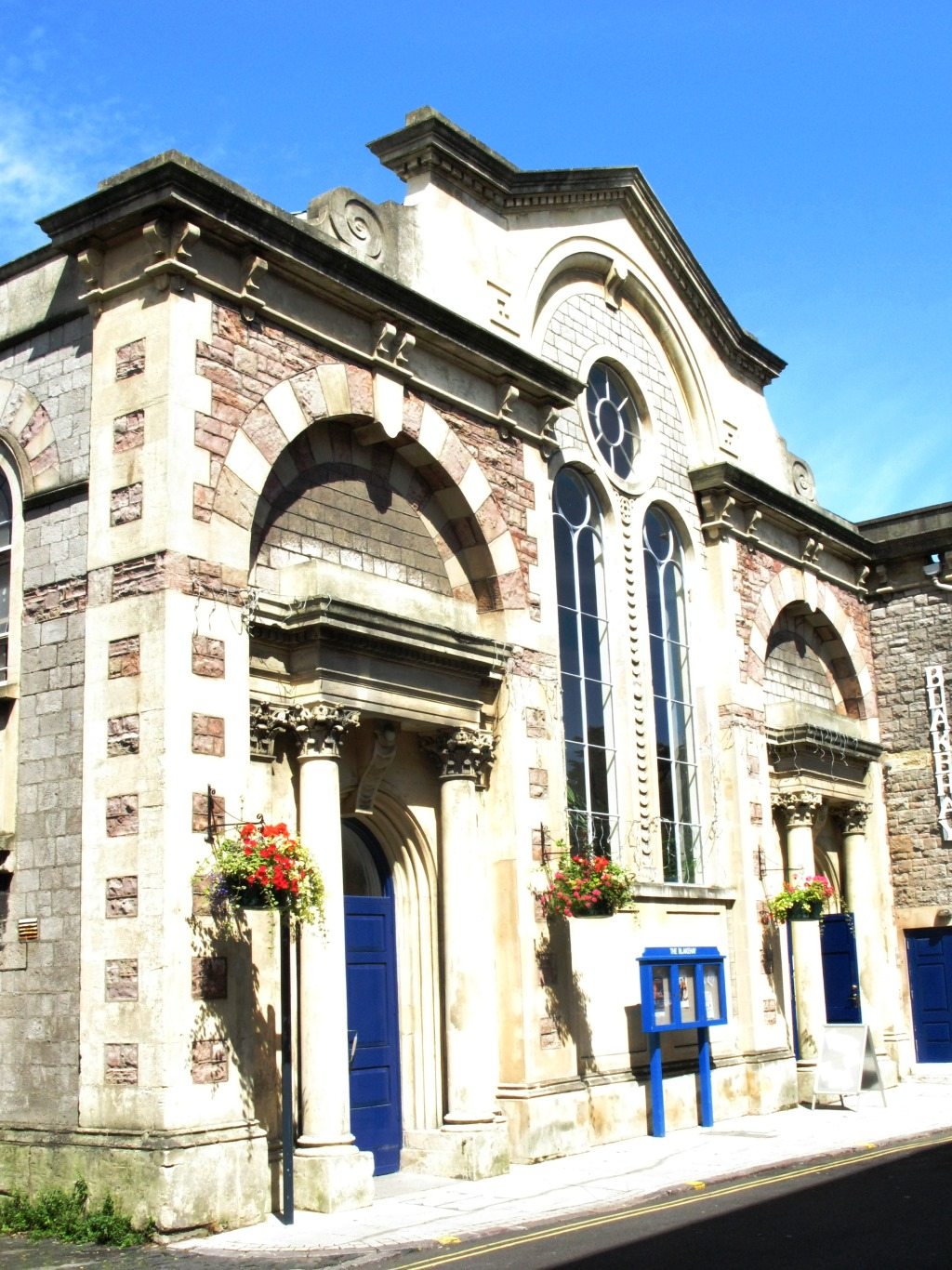
- The Blakehay Theatre which was previously the Wadham Street Baptist Church
- Interactive map of The Blakehay Theatre
- Address: Wadham Street; Weston-super-Mare; England
- Coordinates: 51.351197°N 2.980339°W
- Owner: Weston-super-Mare Town Council
- Capacity: 207 seat
- Current use: Community Theatre

Construction
- Years active: 10
- Architect: Hans Price

The Blakehay Theatre is a 207-seat theatre in Weston-super-Mare, North Somerset, England. Its building was originally a 19th-century Baptist church.

== History ==
The theatre building was Weston-super-Mare's first Baptist church, built in 1850 as Wadham Street Baptist Church, and was also the town's first public building. In 1862 Hans Price, who became the town's leading architect, was commissioned to adapt and enlarge the building. The name comes from "Black Hay", a field that originally lay between the High Street and Wadham Street.

During World War II the theatre was hit by incendiary bombs. After the war it was rebuilt inside the original Victorian shell. In 1985 the building ceased to be a place of worship. In 1986 the Blakehay was saved from demolition and replacement with a block of flats by the actions of the Weston-super-Mare Building Trust and run by the Civic Society who converted into a venue for amateur and professional events and public meetings.

In September 2004 Weston Town Council purchased the theatre for £195,000.

- 1850 – The Blakehay is built as Wadham Street Baptist Church
- 1862 – The building is enlarged
- 1985 – The building closes as a place of worship
- 2004 – Weston-super-Mare Town Council purchases The Blakehay
- 2010 – Refurbishment begins- Work starts on refurbishing parts of the building including new toilets and bar area
- 2011 – present – The Blakehay Theatre is a community theatre for the residents and visitors of Weston-super-Mare

== Current use ==
The Blakehay Theatre operates as live events venue, programming local and regional theatre, music and dance. Facilities in the building include the main Auditorium, Upper Studio, Theatre Bar, two dressing rooms and a box office.
