= Bleadon Hill =

Hill in Somerset, England

- Site of Special Scientific Interest
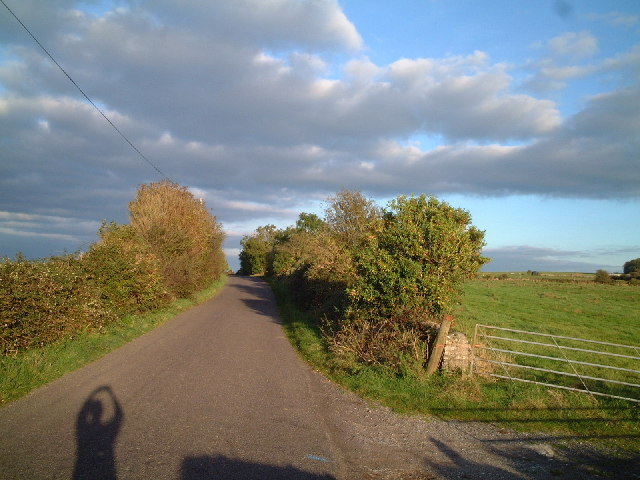

- Location within Somerset
- Location of Bleadon Hill.
- Area of search: Avon
- Grid reference: ST383588
- Coordinates: 51.3124°N 2.9318°W
- Interest: Geological
- Area: 33.41 acres (0.1352 km^{2}; 0.05220 sq mi)
- Notification date: 1999

Bleadon Hill (grid reference ST351574) is a 13.52 hectare geological Site of Special Scientific Interest just north of the village of Bleadon, North Somerset, notified in 1999.

The site is a Geological Conservation Review site, as it shows a low ridge of calcite-cemented Pleistocene sand and gravel on its southern side. Various marine or glacial origins have been postulated for the sediments and it has even been suggested that this is a Mesozoic beach conglomerate. On the basis of the sedimentology, it is most likely that these sediments accumulated during the Quaternary when an ice sheet rested against Bleadon Hill.

There is evidence or agricultural use of the land in the medieval period and possibly from Roman times.
