= Hans Price Academy =

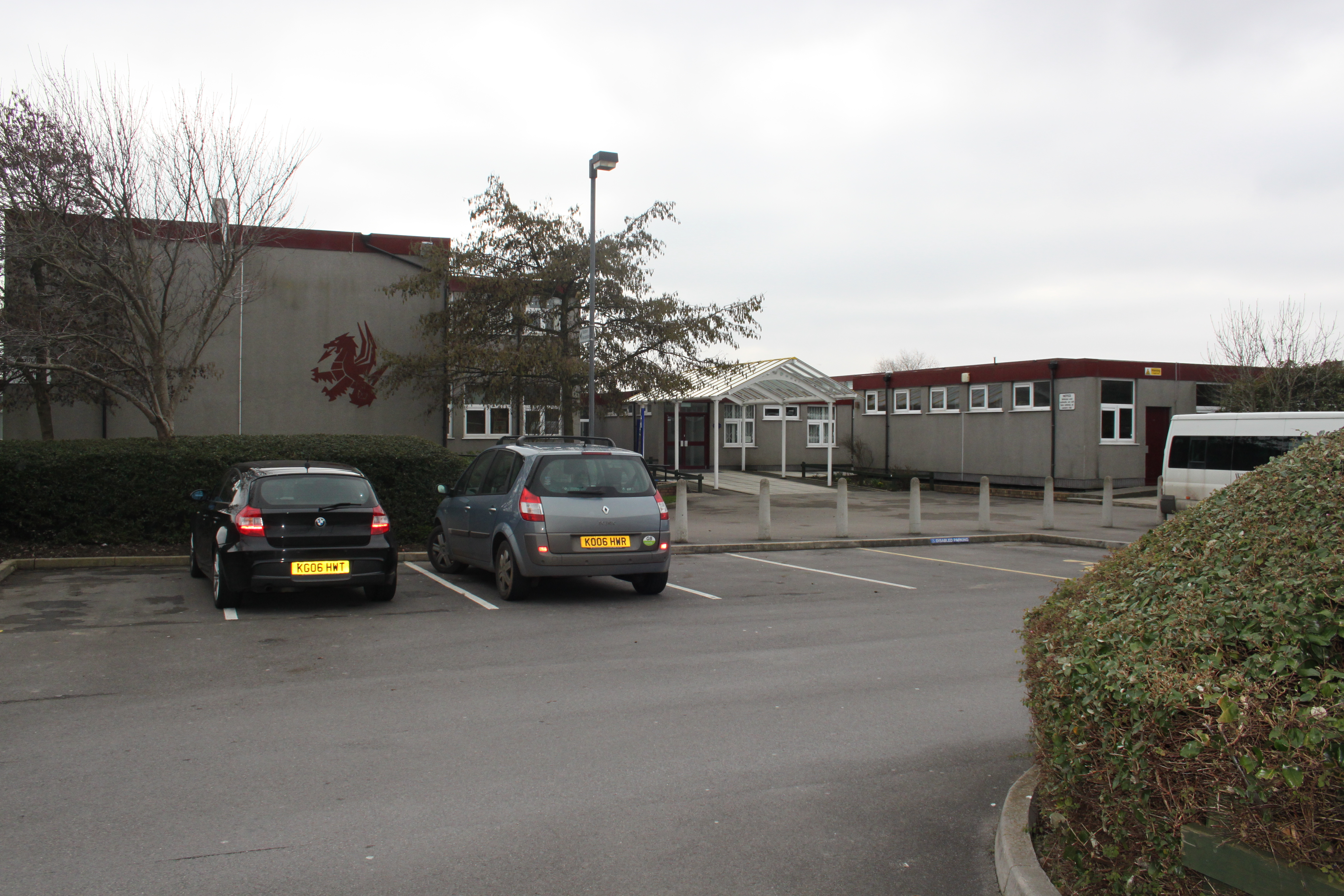

Location
- Marchfields Way; Weston-super-Mare, Somerset, BS23 3QP; England; 51.3383°N 2.9643°W

Information
- Type: Academy
- Local authority: North Somerset Council
- Trust: Cabot Learning Federation
- Department for Education URN: 136708 Tables
- Ofsted: Reports
- Principal: Adrian Esch
- Gender: Coeducational
- Age range: 11-16
- Enrolment: 933
- Houses: Clarus, Fortis, Mando and Acer
- Colours: Red, Green, Blue and Yellow
- Website: www.hansprice.org.uk

The Hans Price Academy, formerly known as Wyvern Community School, is a coeducational secondary school located on the Bournville estate in Weston-super-Mare, Somerset, England. The school (which previously had specialist Sports College status) had 743 students between the ages of 11 and 16 years as of 2013.

In 2009, 31% of the pupils at the school achieved 5 or more GCSE passes at grade C or above including mathematics and English, and a contextual value added (CVA) figure of 1002.1. In 2010, the GCSE score improved to 35%, but was still the lowest in North Somerset, and was below the local authority average of 56.1% and national average of 53.4%.

In 2009, plans to turn the school into an academy were revealed. On 1 May 2011, Wyvern School became the Hans Price Academy, named after local Victorian architect Hans Price. The academy is now run by educational charity Cabot Learning Foundation. The current principal is Adrian Esch, who took over from Tony Searle.

== Notable former pupils ==
- Rupert Graves, actor
