= Hans Price =

English architect (1835–1912)

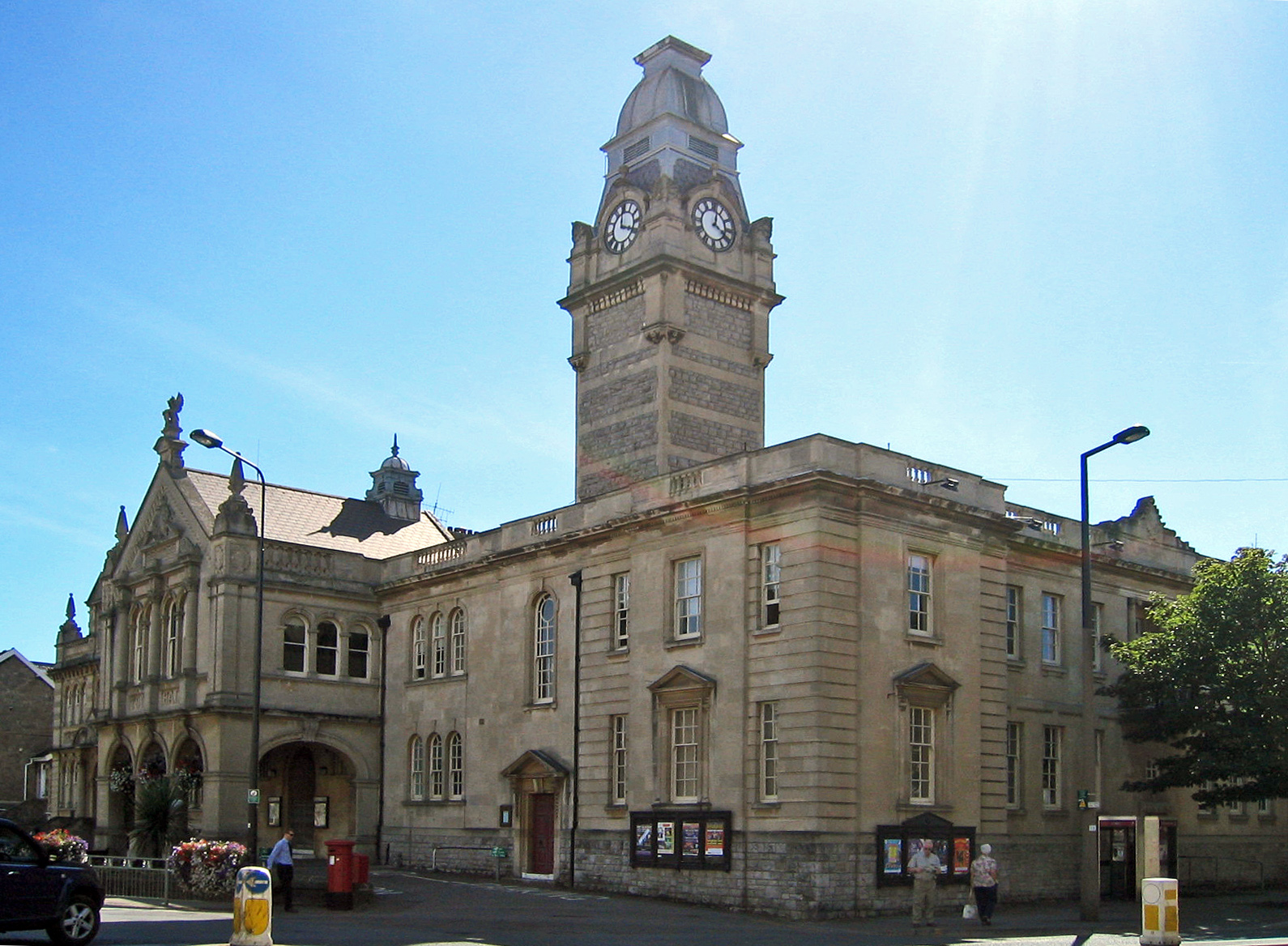
Hans Price made a significant addition to Weston-super-Mare Town Hall

Hans Price (1835–1912) was the architect responsible for much of the development of Weston-super-Mare, in North Somerset, England, during the Victorian era.

== Life ==
Hans Fowler Price was born in St James's parish, Bristol. He studied under Thomas Barry in Liverpool. By the time that he married Jane Baker in 1862 he had already established his own architectural practice in Weston-super-Mare.

Jane's father was the solicitor to the Smyth Pigott family who were major landowners in the town. Price used these connections to build his business and his personal standing. He spent time as a Town Commissioner, a director of the Gaslight Company, and on many other boards and committees.

== Style ==
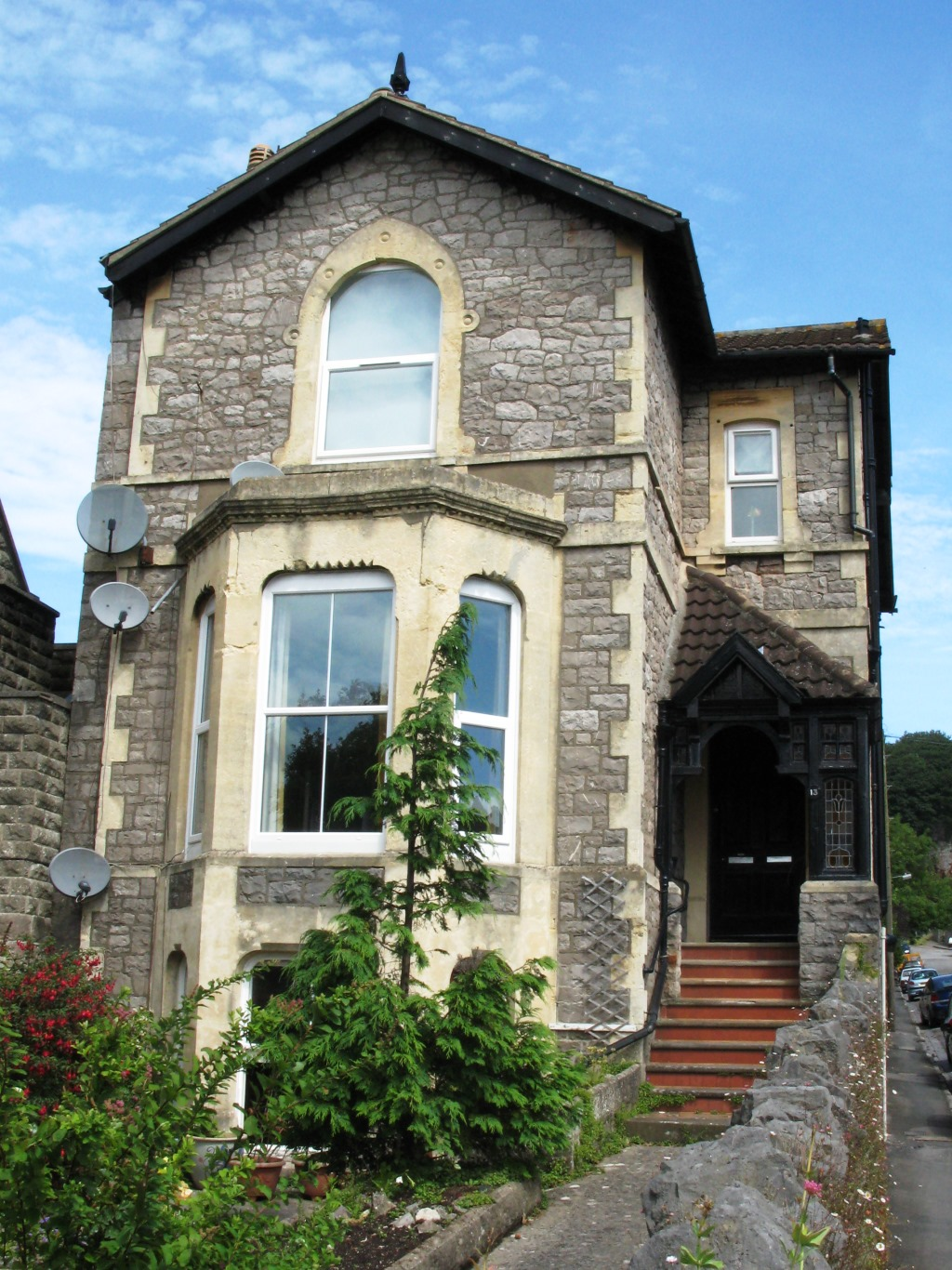
Queens Road, which leads up to the Town Quarry

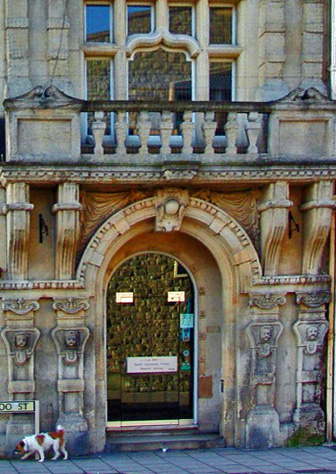
Entrance aedicule to the Mercury Office incorporating classical and eclectic stylistic elements based on the triumphal arch, 1885

Price was an eclectic architect who successfully mixed styles such as Classical, Gothic, Moorish and Flemish in different buildings, his works invariably used materials characteristic of the area. Grey Mendip limestone from local quarries formed the walls, generally as squared rubble blocks. These were decorated with pale yellow Bath Stone quoins and details, and roofed with Welsh slate shipped across the River Severn or tiles produced at the Royal Pottery, Weston-super-Mare. Both domestic and public buildings of this description are familiar in Weston-super-Mare, Clevedon, and elsewhere in the area, having been built from the 1840s through to the 1900s. Many of these were designed by other architects and builders who were influenced by Price's work.

Although rows of Price's houses have a standardised look, the extensive use of individual details in areas such as gables and windows mean that no two adjacent buildings look the same, although individual details were often repeated further down the road.

== Works ==
Using his wife's family connections, Price was responsible for developing much of the housing on Worlebury Hill to the north of the developing Weston-super-Mare town centre. Many buildings in Church Road, Grove Park Road, Cecil Road, South Road and other roads in the district were designed in his offices.

Public buildings designed by Hans Price include:

=== Weston-super-Mare ===
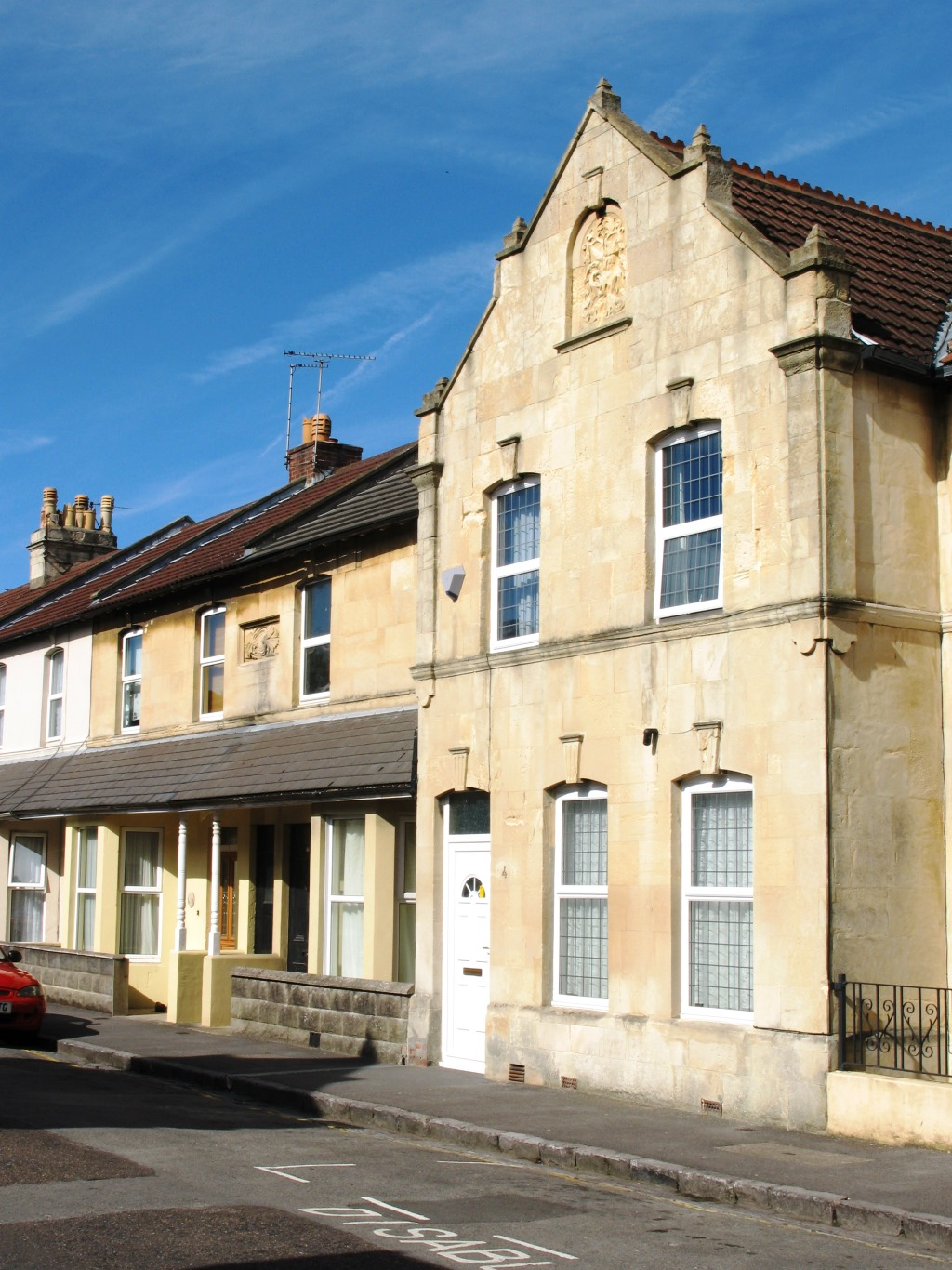
Wooler Road, building at forefront was originally part of the nearby hospital

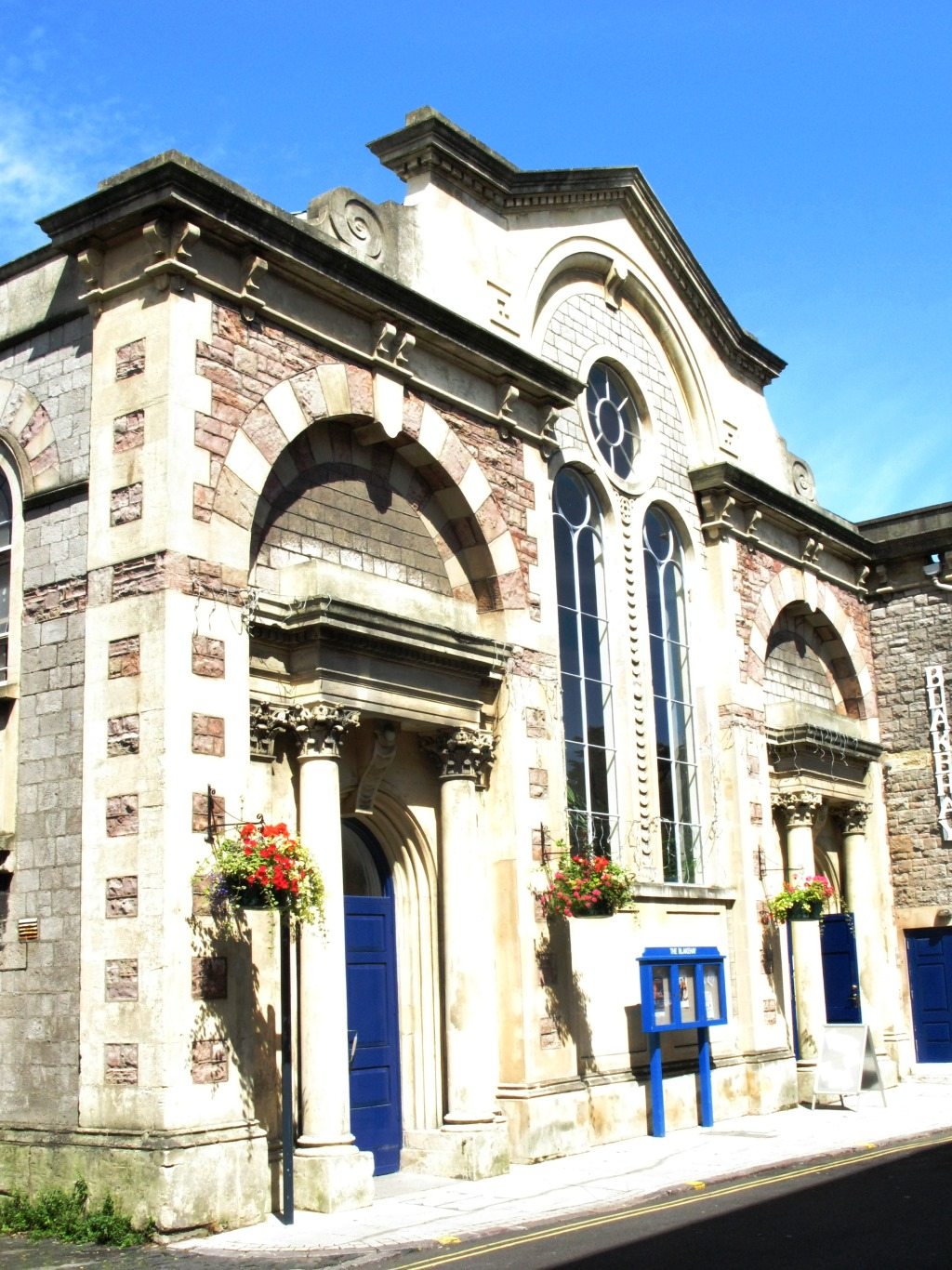
Wadham Street Baptist Church, now The Blakehay Theatre

- Wadham Street Baptist Church (1862). Situated in the oldest part of the town, this church was built using parts of the first public building in Weston-super-Mare that had been on the same site. It now houses the Blakehay Theatre.
- Hospital (1865). Later becoming the dispensary for an expanded hospital in Alfred Street, this building has been converted into flats and is known as Hans Price House.
- Toll House and Piermaster's House (1867) and Birnbeck Pierhead buildings (1897). The pier links Worlebury Hill and Birnbeck island at the northern limit of the seafront. The building is currently derelict and, as is the pier itself, in need of being found a new sustainable use that will allow its restoration.
- Bristol Road Baptist Church (1866). This church is built in pink limestone. It serves the upper-class housing development on Worlebury Hill and is situated just above The Boulevard.
- Sanatorium (1871). Situated in Uphill Road North at the south end of the beach, the Royal Hospital has since been converted into flats as part of the Royal Sands housing development. The Hans Price-designed building is now known as Royal Court
- The Boulevard (1874–85). Price built piecemeal much of this street including his own office (1874), Church Institute (1881), Masonic Lodge of St Kew (1881 – now the Constitutional Club), and the Weston Mercury newspaper office (1885).
- Somerset House (1897–9).This terrace of shops occupies the east side of the northern section of the High Street. The central section once housed a market hall but this was destroyed by fire in the 1960s and was replaced by The Playhouse theatre.
- The School of Science and Art (1892). This school, in Lower Church Road, was completely refurbished from a derelict state in 2012, and is now named the Weston College Conference Centre. In August 2013, the college's redevelopment of the building was nominated for an English Heritage Angel Award to "recognise the time, effort and determination" of the college for the rescue of the building.
- Weston-super-Mare Town Hall (1897). Hans Price was responsible for the extension of an earlier Town Hall in Walliscote Road.
- The Board Schools (1897). Now Walliscote School, separate boys' and girls' schools were built on a shared site close to the Town Hall.
- Locking Road Schools. This was the Walliscote Senior School for many years but has now been converted to flats.
- Public Library (1899). A rare building that makes extensive use of red brick. It is situated at the eastern end of The Boulevard.
- Weston-super-Mare Gaslight Company (1912). The workshops for the gas company in Burlington Street now houses the Weston Museum.
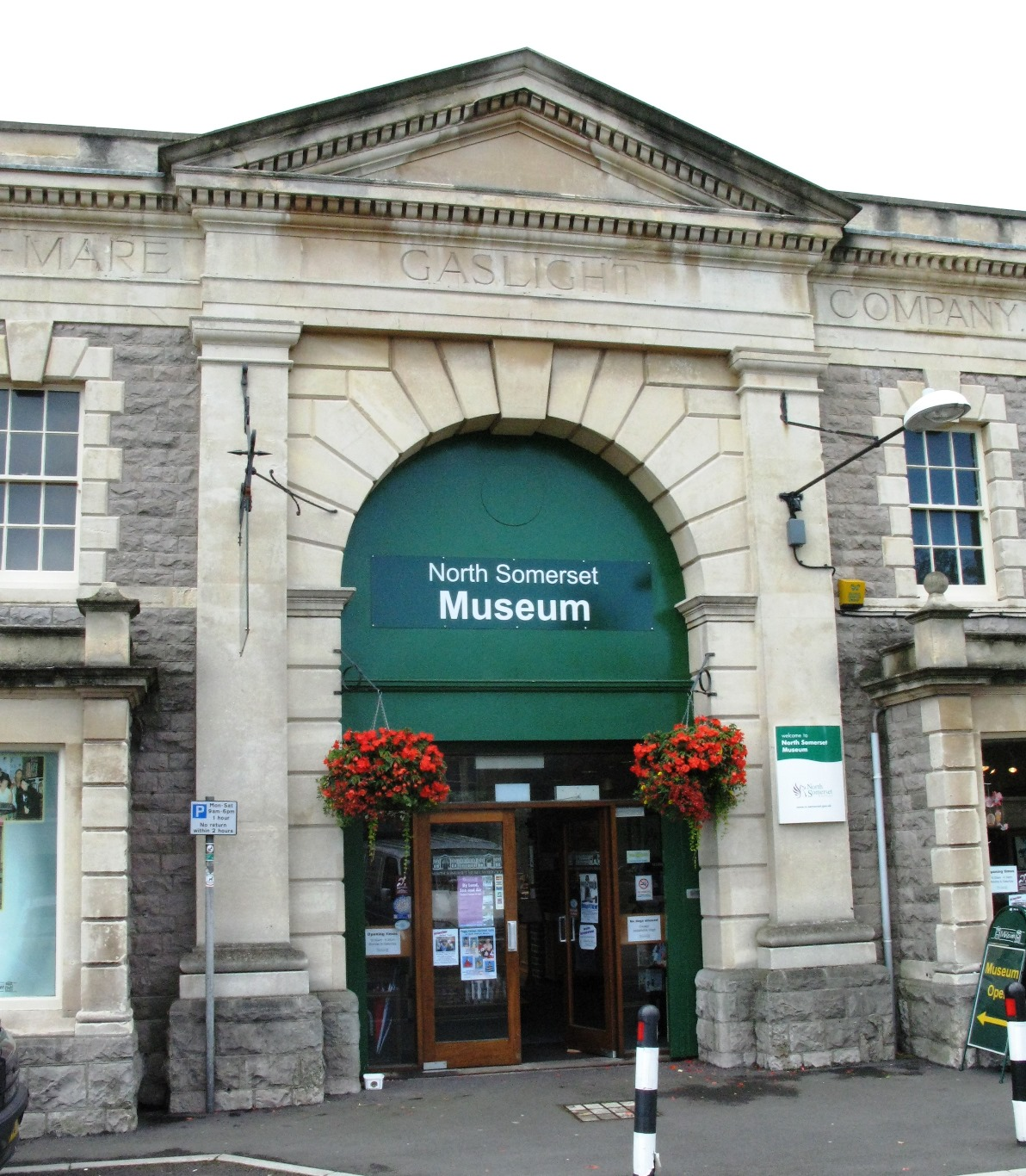
Gaslight Company

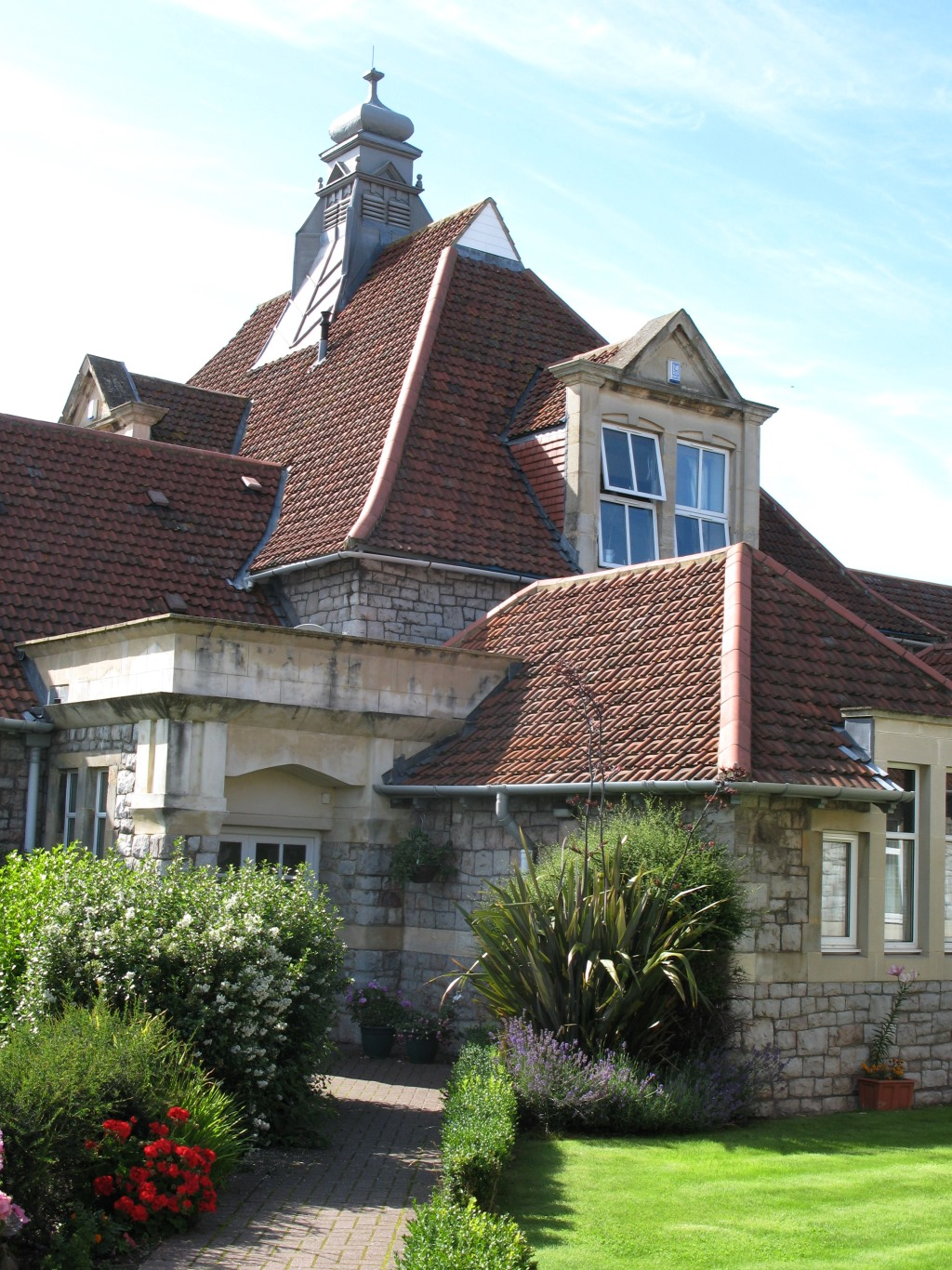
Locking Road School

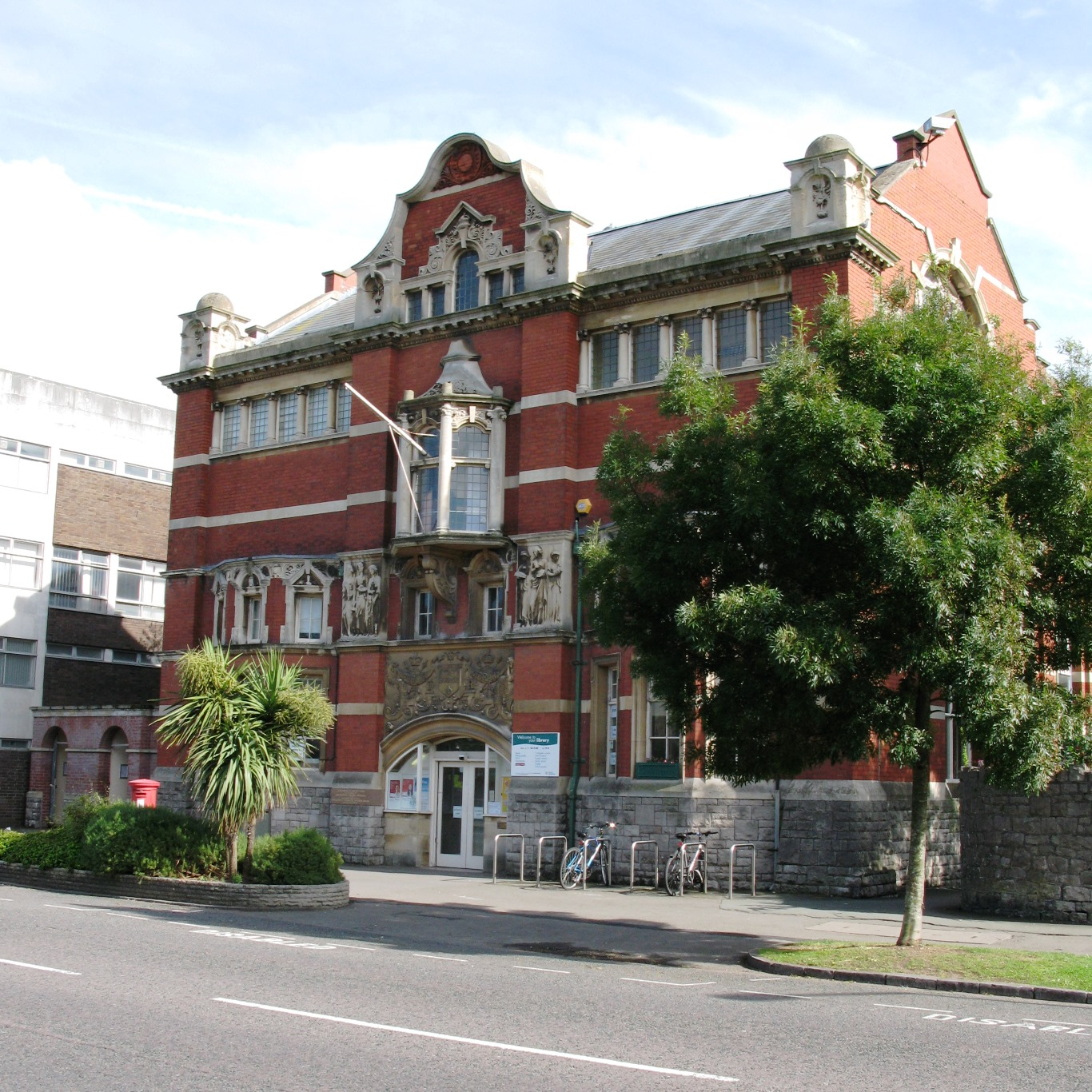
Public Library

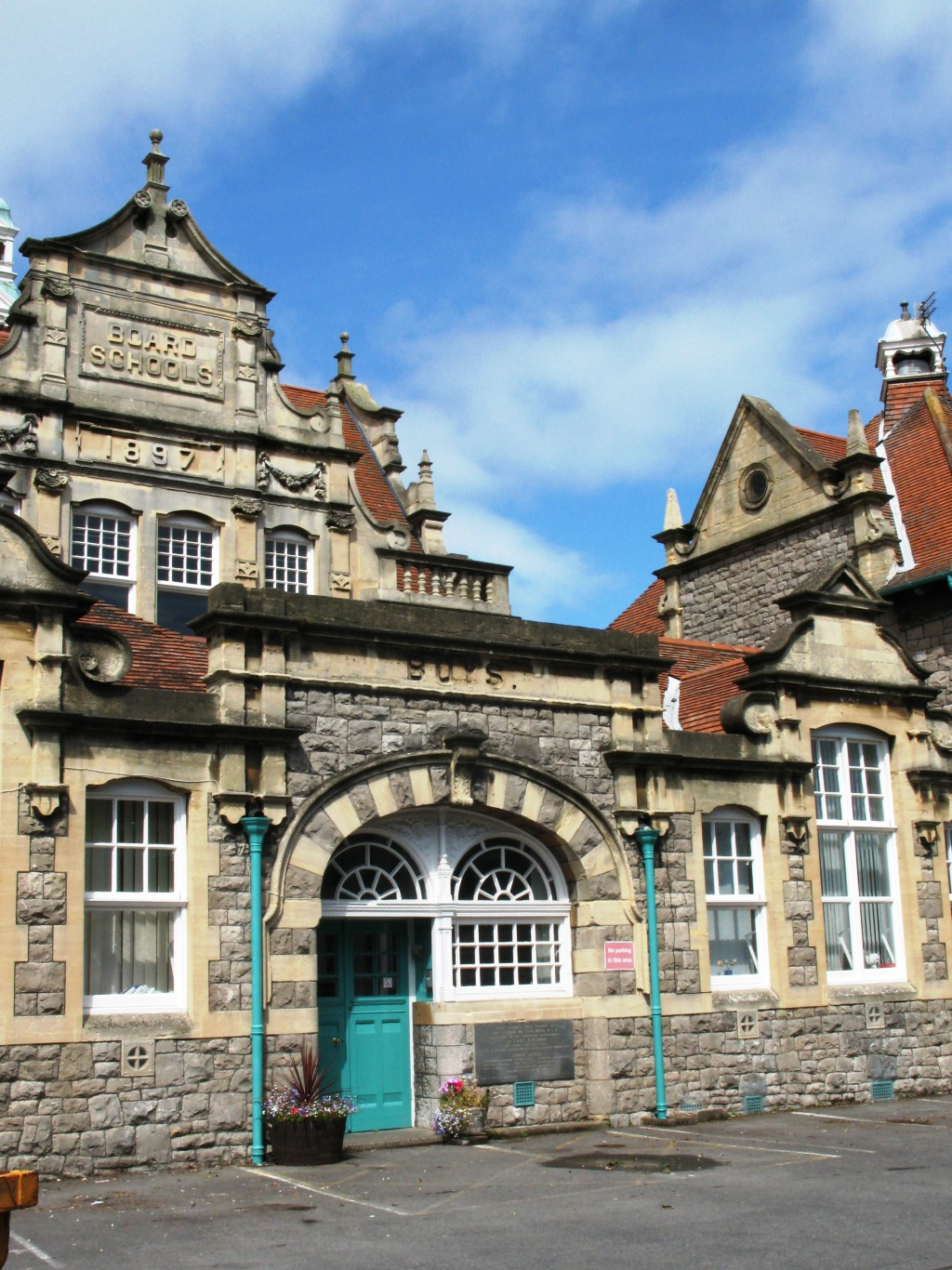
Walliscote School

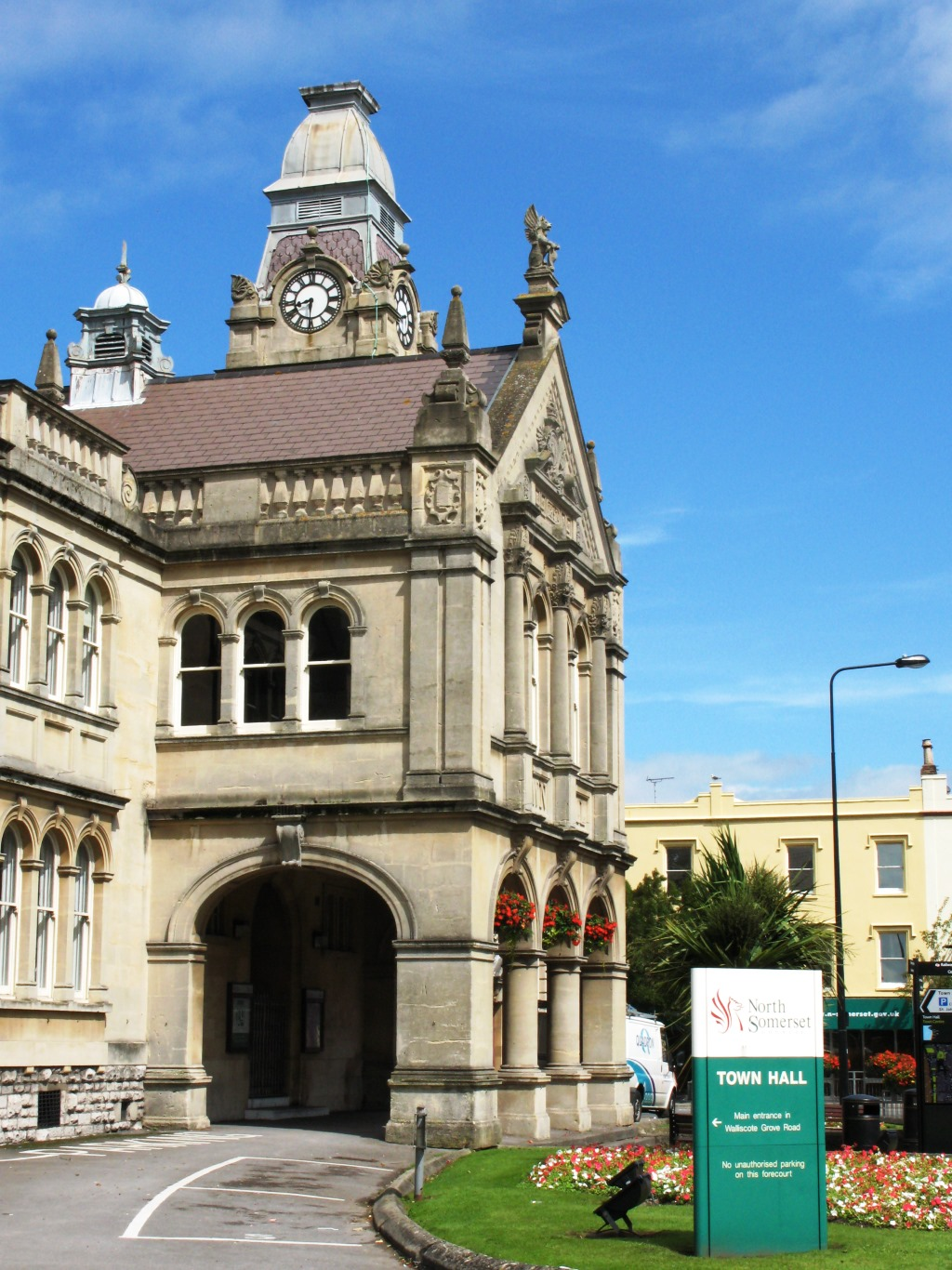
Town Hall

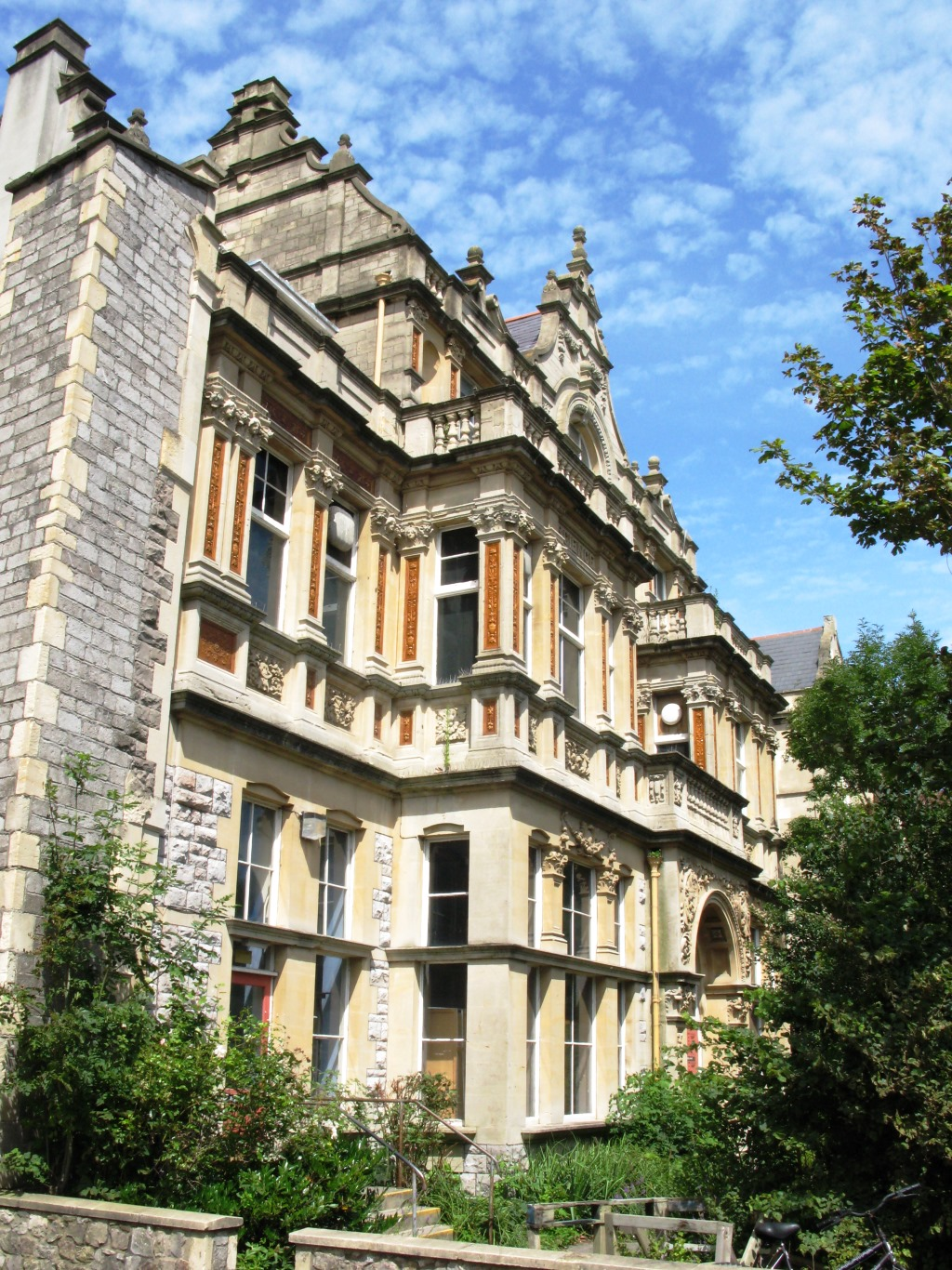
School of Science and Art

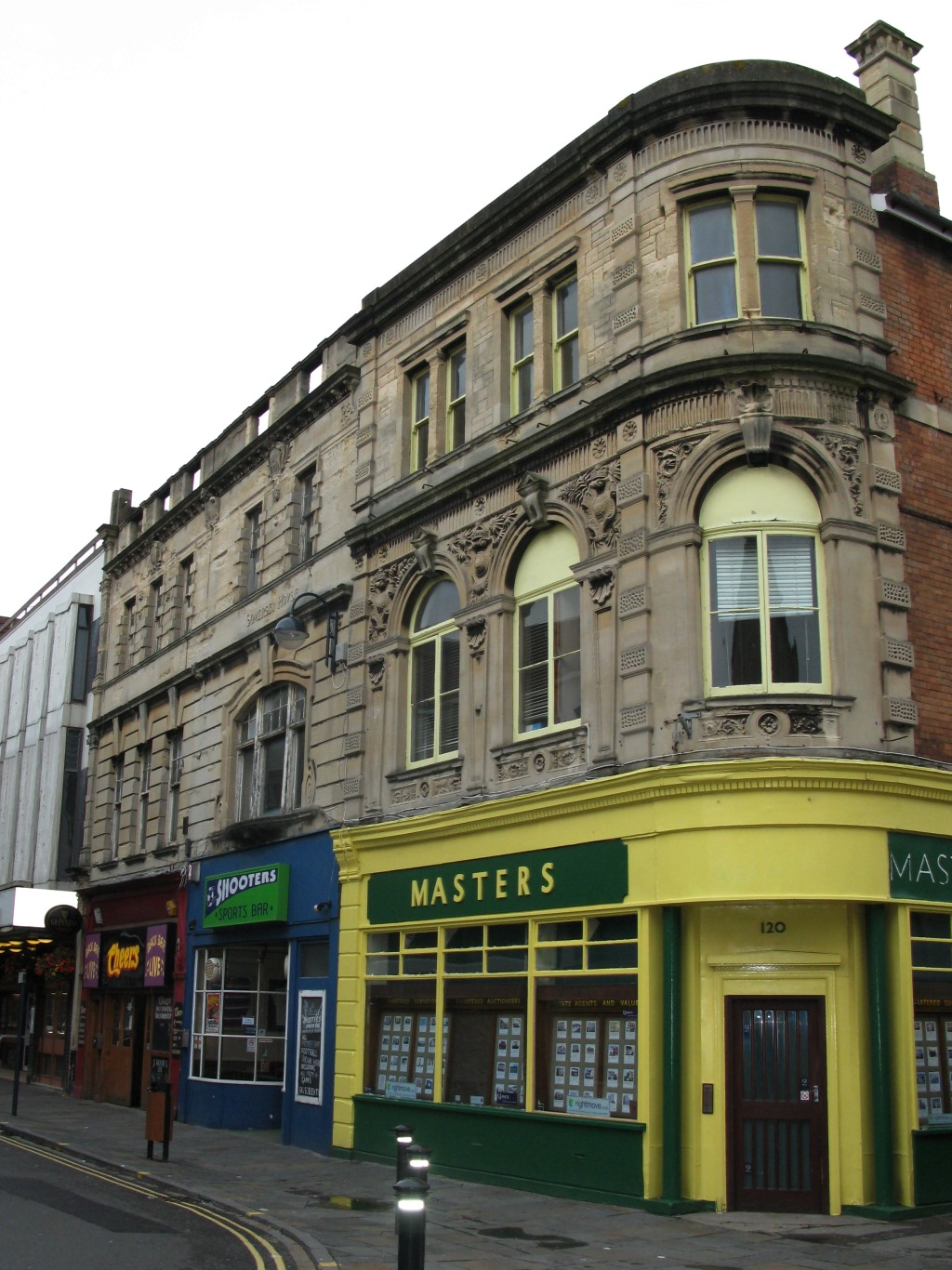
Somerset House

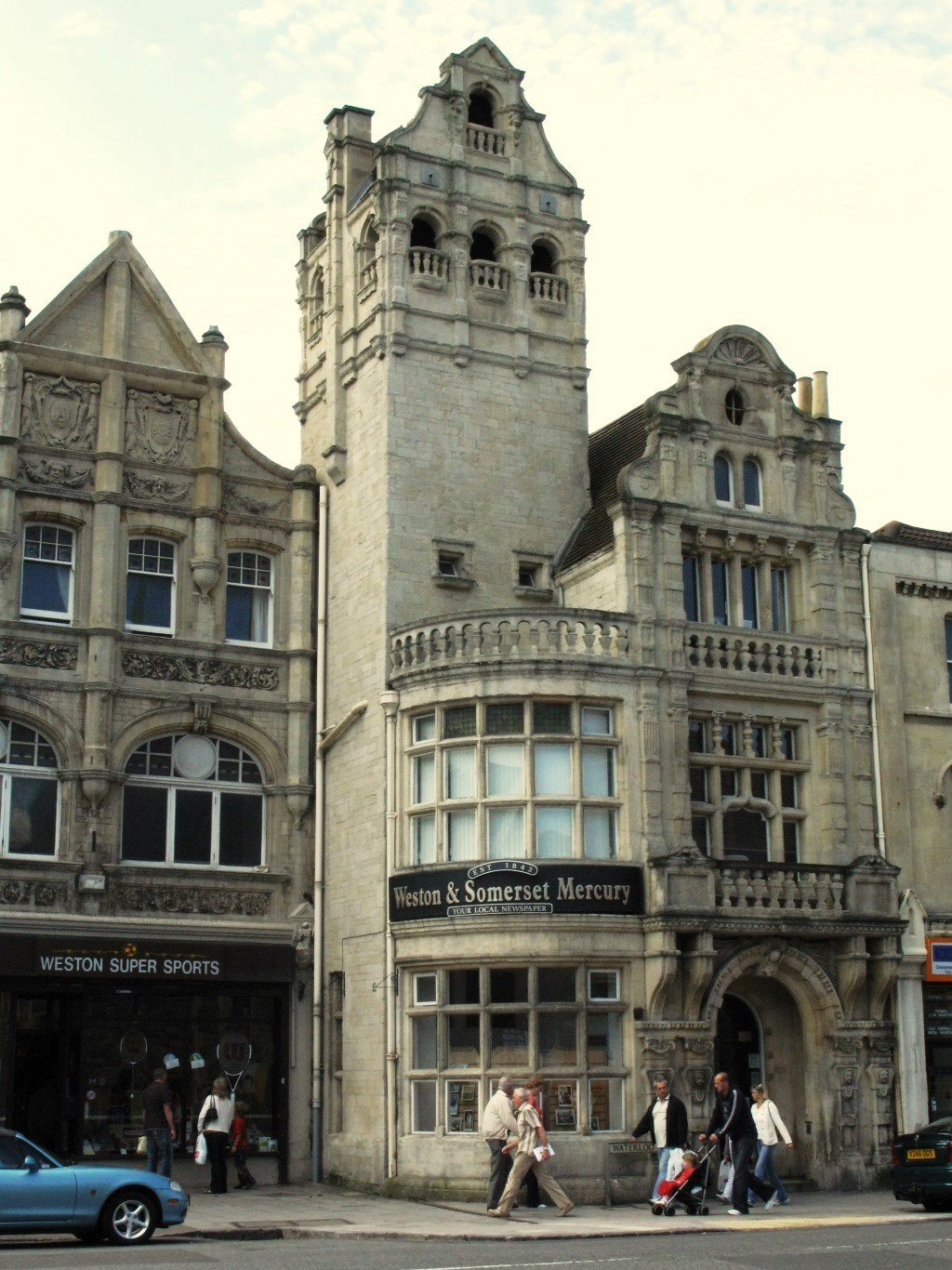
Weston Mercury Office

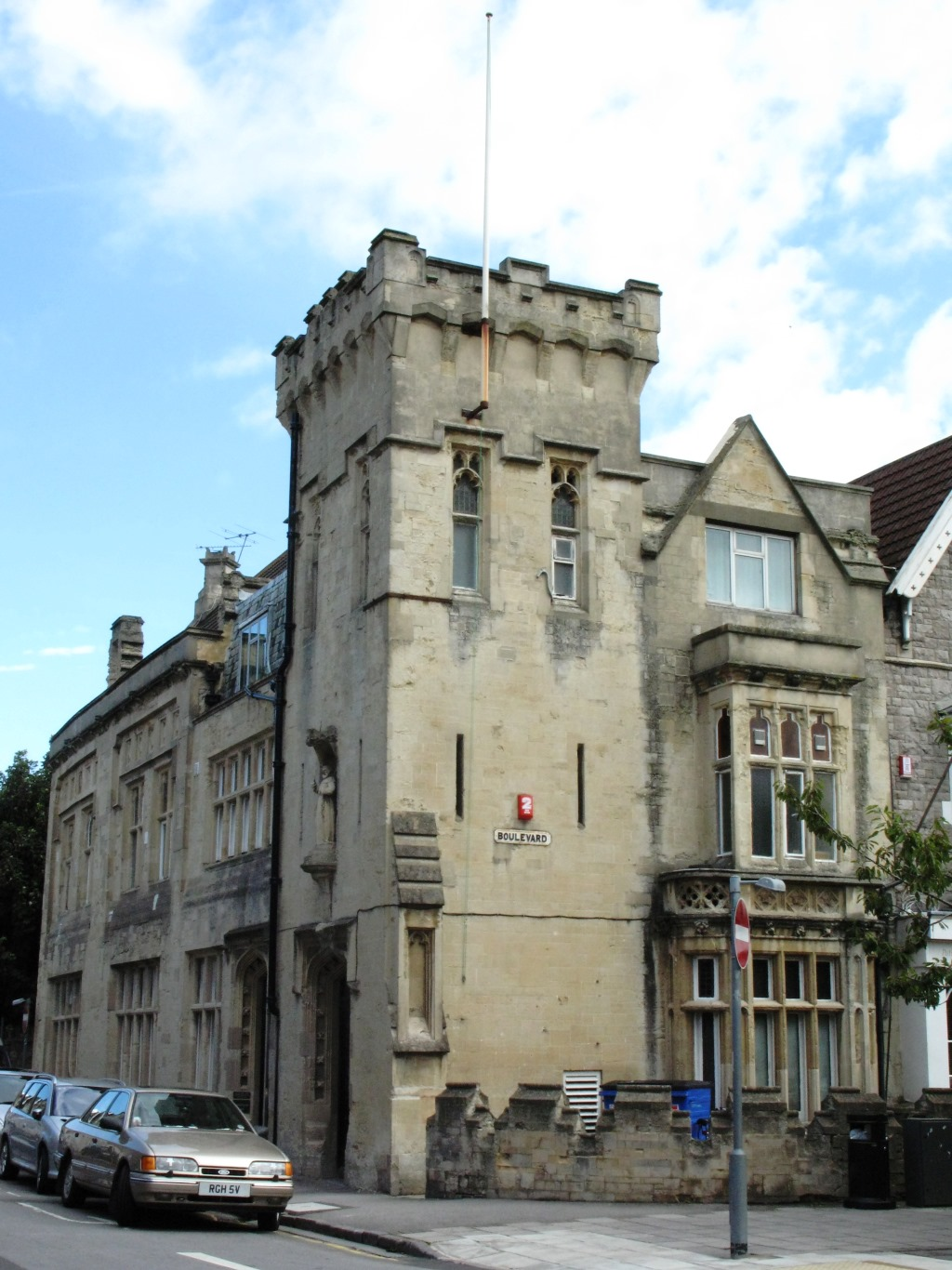
Lodge of St Kew

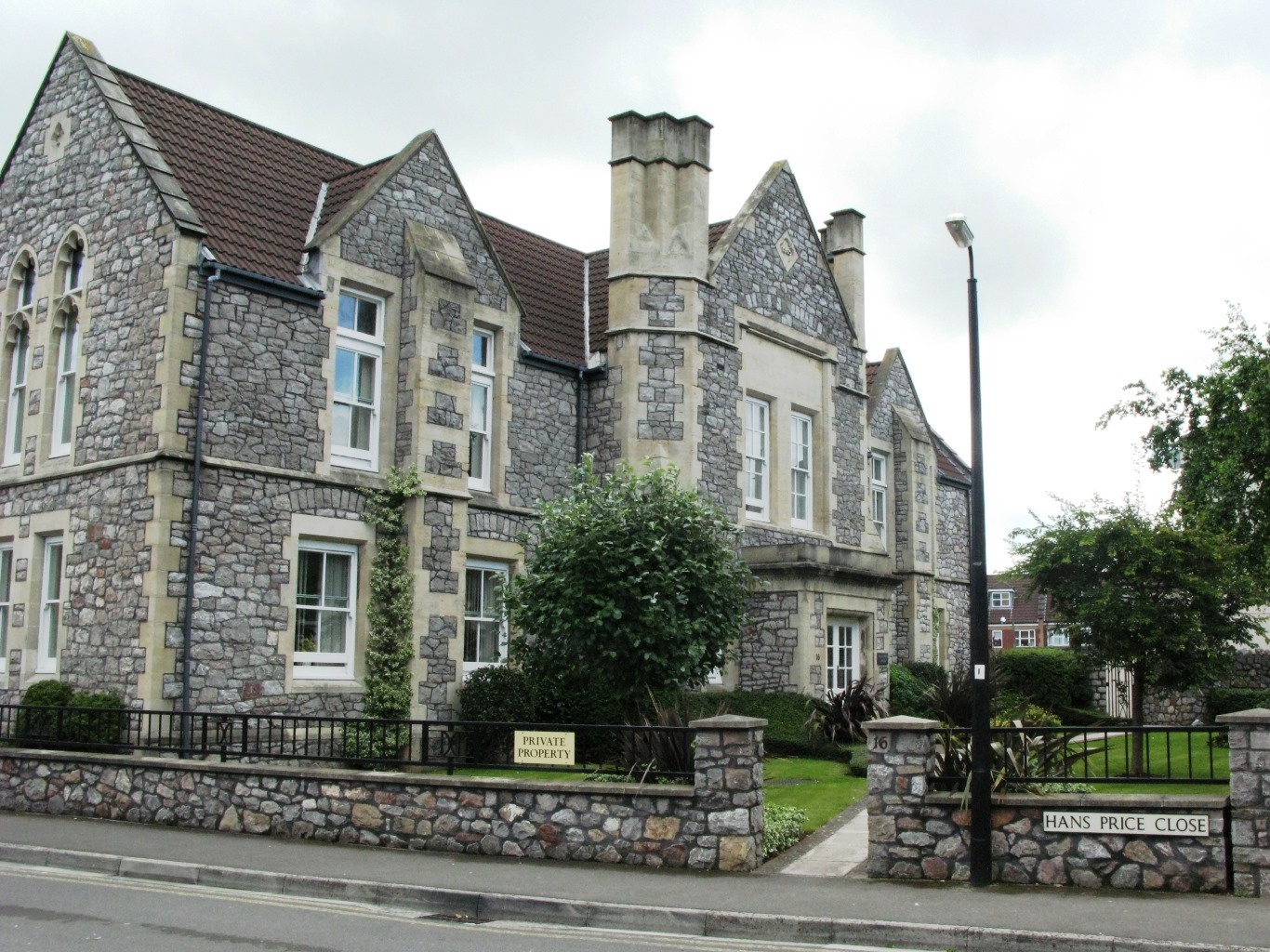
Hans Price House stands on the corner of Hans Price Close

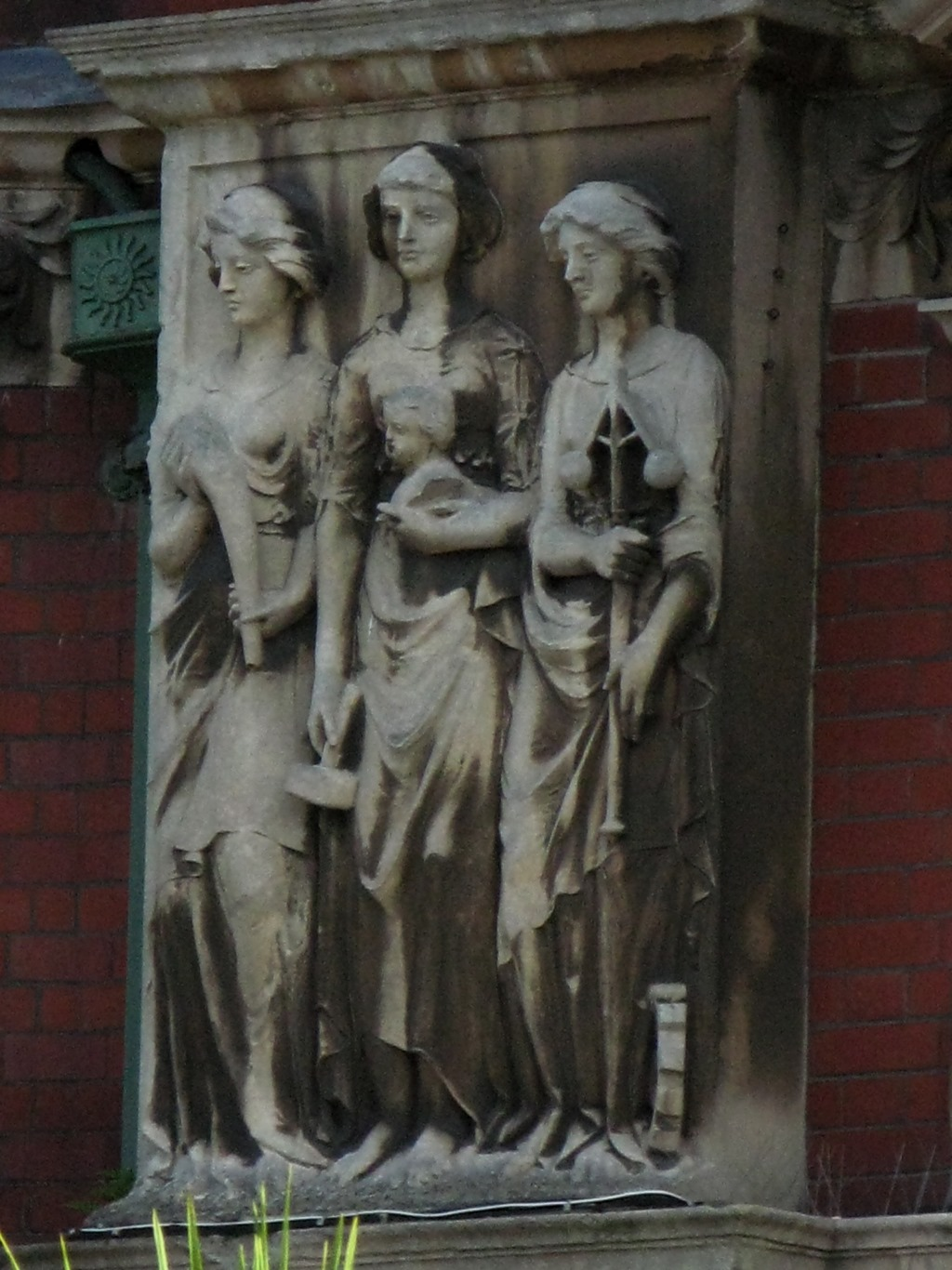
The Muses above the Library

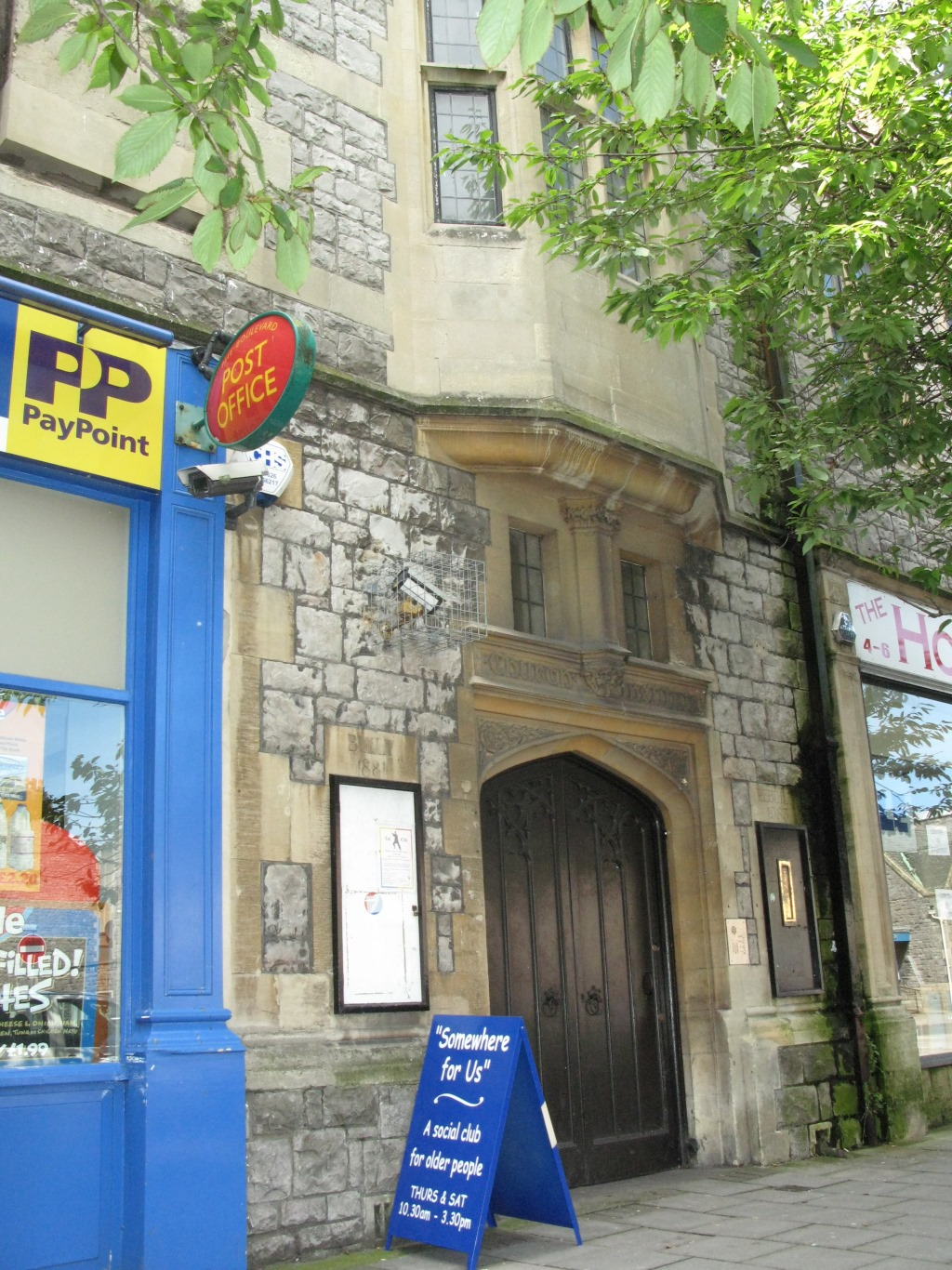
Church Institute

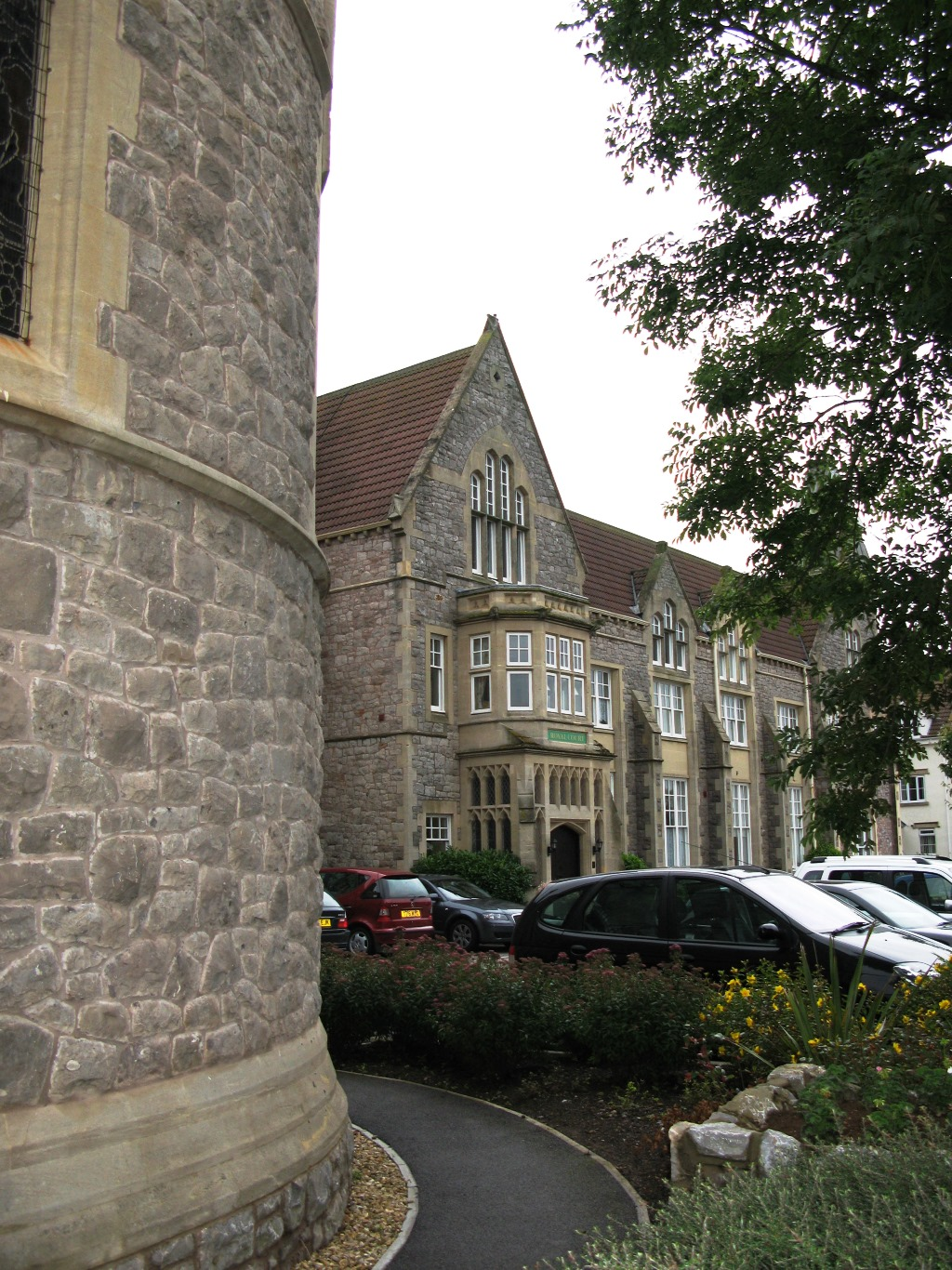
Sanatorium

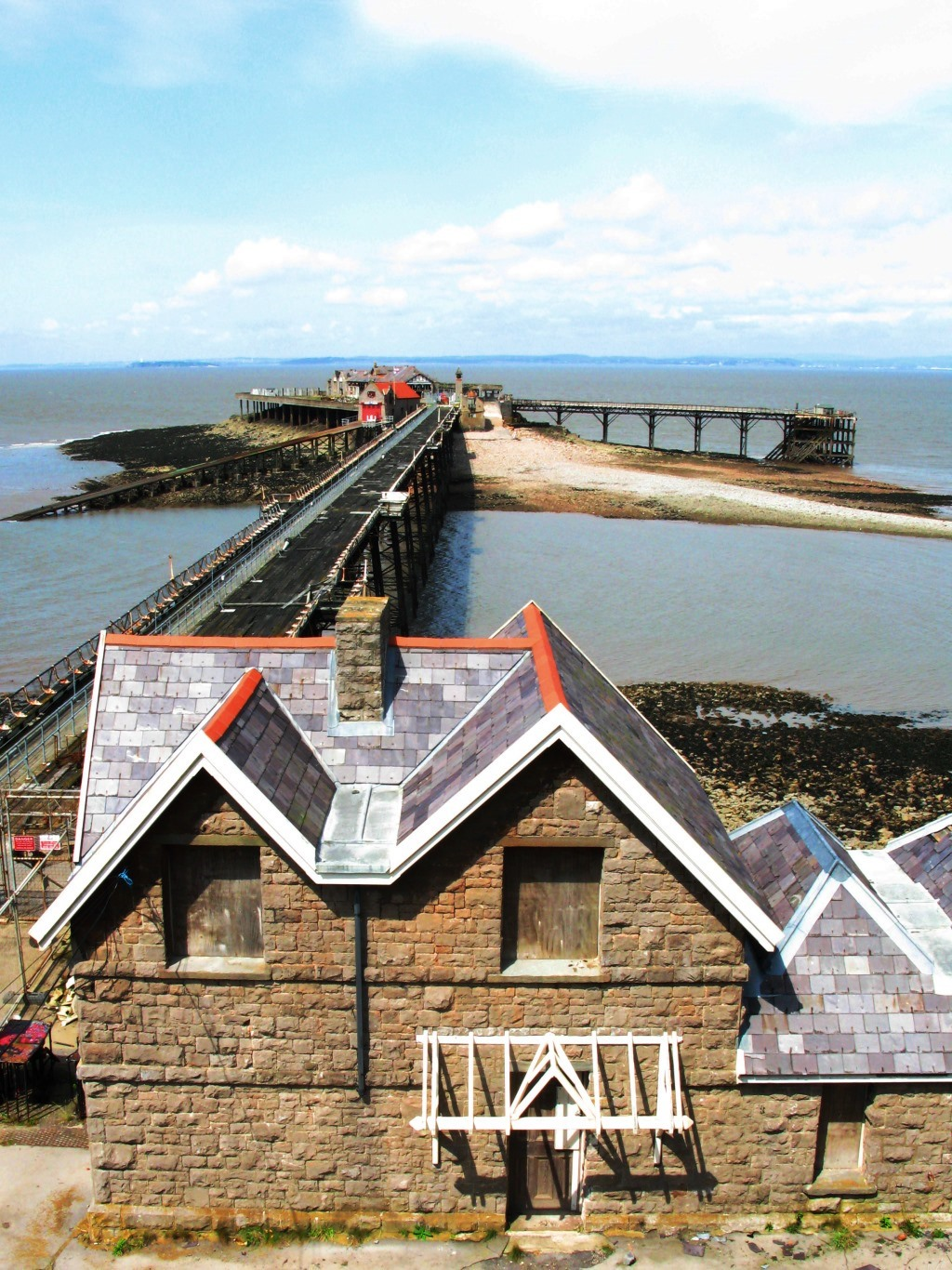
Old Pier Toll House

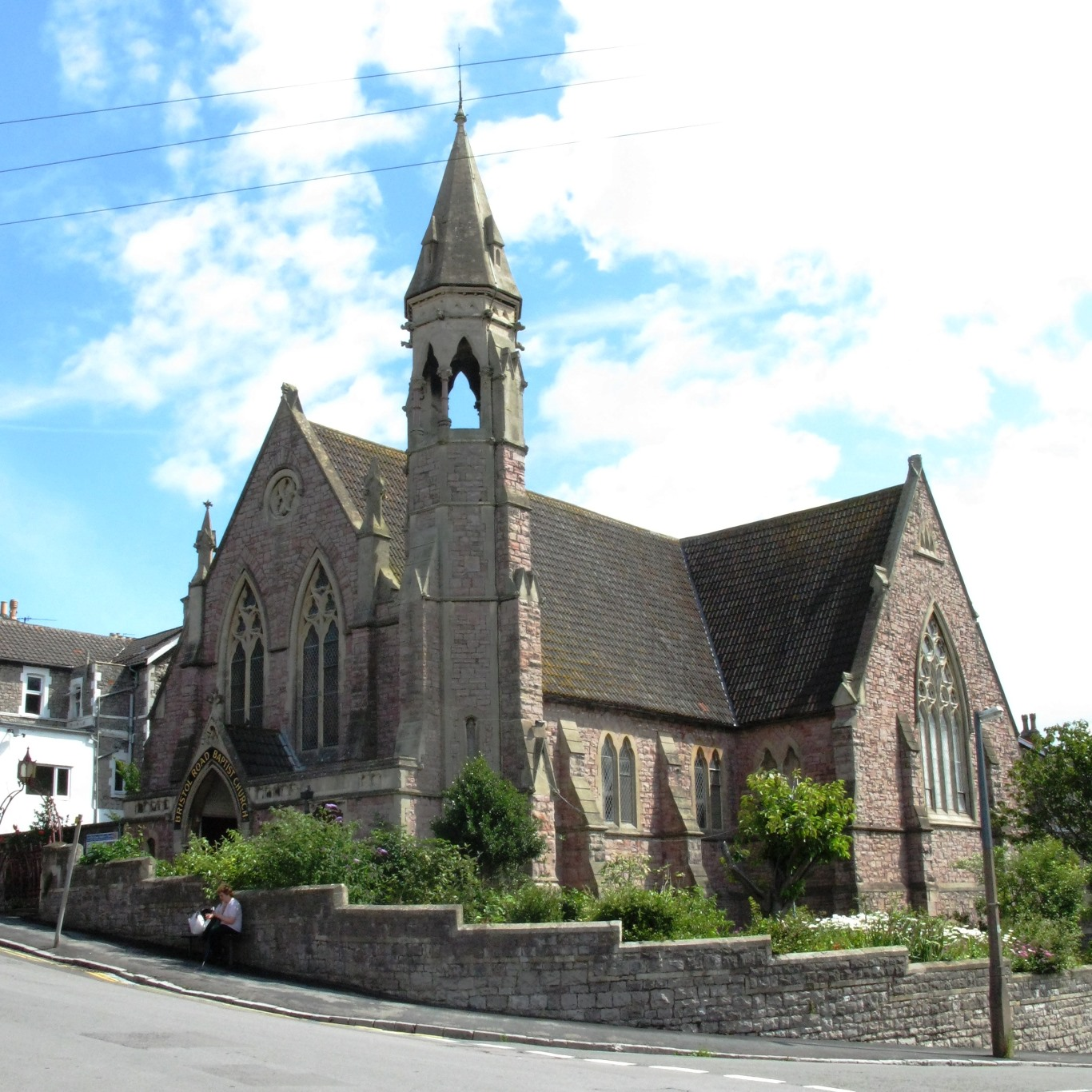
Bristol Road

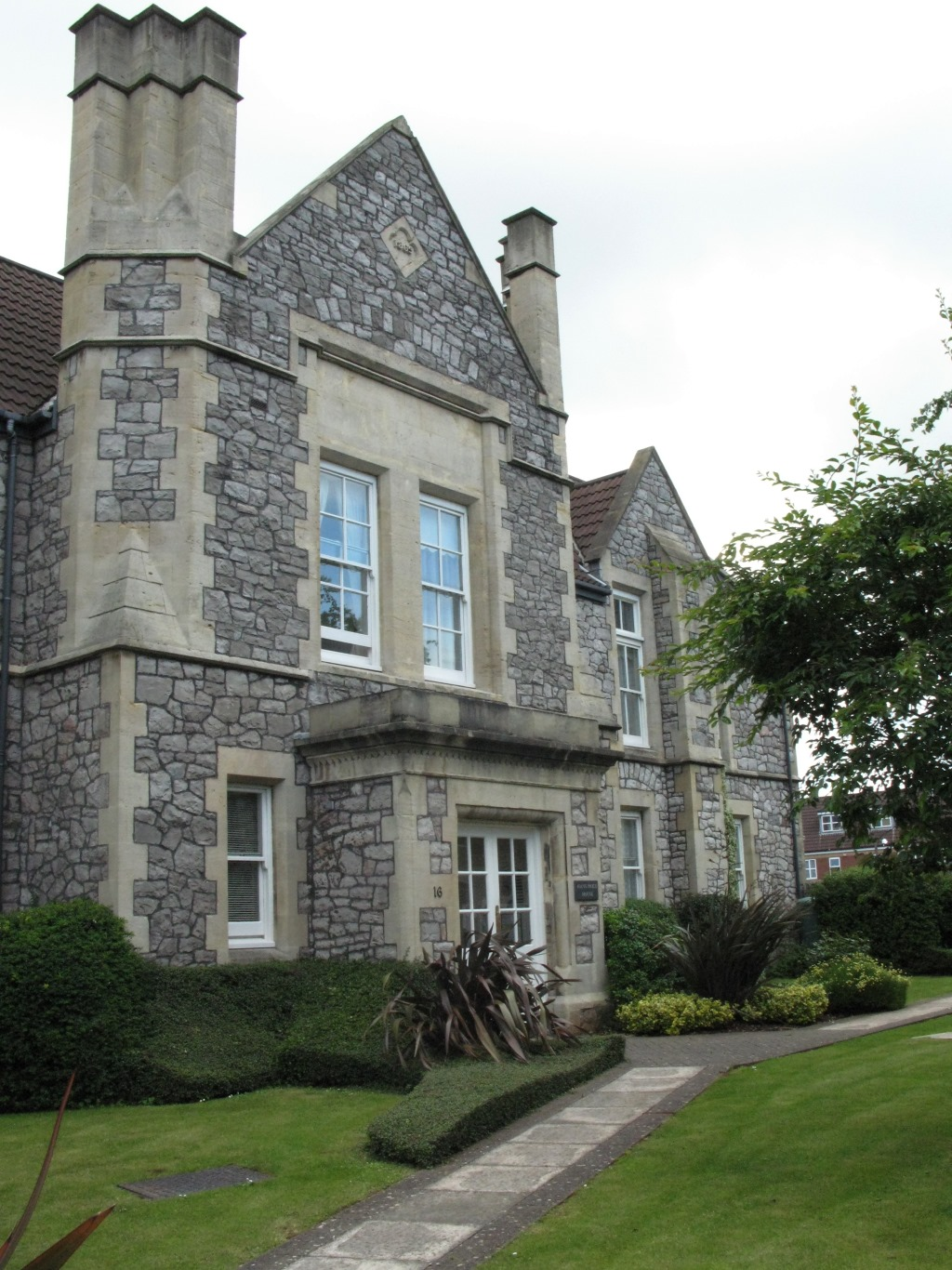
Hospital Dispensary

=== Elsewhere ===
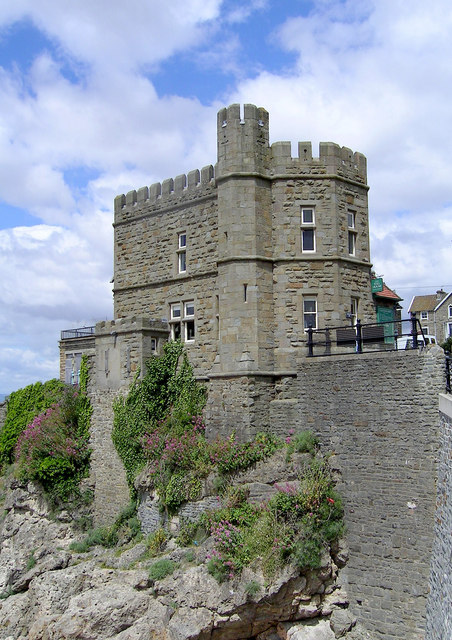
The toll house on Clevedon Pier

- The Toll House, Clevedon Pier.
- The Royal Pier Hotel, Clevedon.
- Town Market Hall, Clevedon.
- Mortuary Chapels, Oswestry Cemetery, Oswestry, Shropshire (opened 1862).
- Stapleton Road Chapel, Bristol, built 1871.
- Unitarian mission chapel, Feeder Road, St Phillips, Bristol, built 1897, demolished 1934.

== Legacy ==
An art gallery in Weston College called the Hans Price Gallery was housed in the former School of Science and Art, a building that was designed by Price. The old Weston-super-Mare Hospital dispensary has been named Hans Price House and stands on the corner of Hans Price Close. In 2011, it was announced that Wyvern Community School in Weston-super-Mare was to receive academy funding of £14 million and be renamed to Hans Price Academy. In December 2018, a blue plaque was unveiled at the former School of Science and Art, commemorating Hans Price.
