= Stapleton Road Chapel =

Congregational church in Bristol, England

Stapleton Road Congregational Chapel
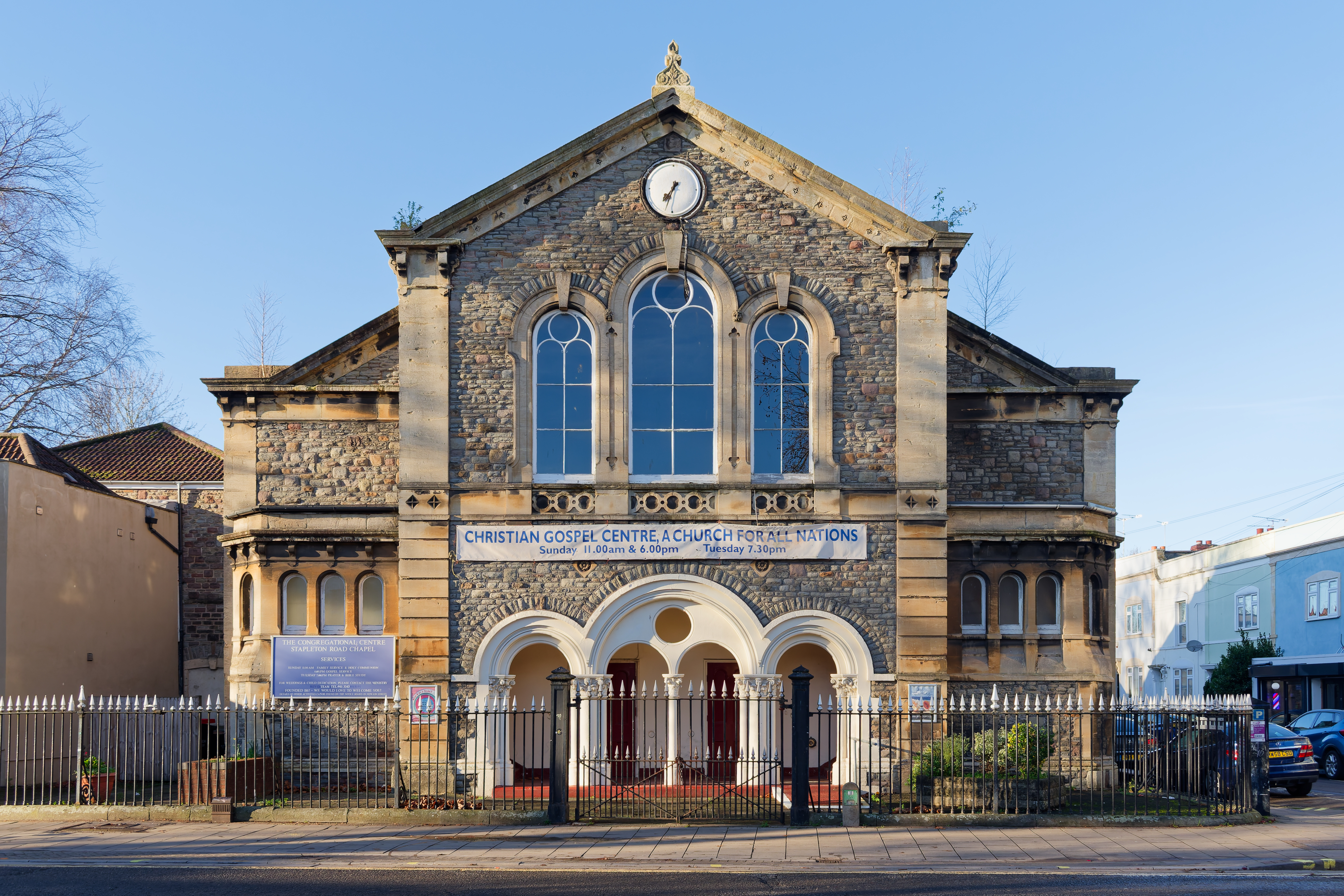
- The facade of Stapleton Road Chapel
- Stapleton Road Congregational Chapel
- 51.4599°N 2.5756°W
- Location: Easton, Bristol, England
- Denomination: Congregational

History
- Status: Active
- Founded: 1867

Architecture
- Architect: Hans Price
- Style: Italianate; Bristol Byzantine
- Groundbreaking: 1868 (schoolroom); 1871 (chapel)
- Completed: 1871
- Construction cost: £2,350 (1871)

Stapleton Road Chapel is a Congregational church located in the Easton area of Bristol, England, that was established in the mid-19th century to serve the growing working-class population of east Bristol. The building, designed by Hans Price and built in 1871, is characterised by its Italianate architectural features. The chapel did not participate in the United Reformed Church merger in 1972, thus remaining an independent Congregational church as part of the Congregational Federation. It faces Stapleton Road and is located opposite to the Easton Leisure Centre.

== History ==
The congregation originated from a schism at the Castle Green Chapel (which would later relocate to Castle Green Congregational Church) in late 1866 or early 1867. A group of separatists initially gathered for worship in the Old Workhouse on Pennywell Road. As the congregation expanded, they secured a site on the Goodhind Estate, an area then undergoing significant development with the construction of hundreds of new terraced houses. The acquired parcel of land was described at the time as being situated nearly opposite the Wagon and Horses public house, now the site of the Easton Leisure Centre.

The first permanent structure on the site was a large schoolroom, opened in March 1868. Designed to accommodate religious services until funds for a main chapel could be raised, the schoolroom was a stone building featuring a gallery and nine classrooms, with a capacity of 1,000 people. The church managers rejected the practice of pew rents, declaring that all seats would be free with the church relying entirely on donations by congregants.

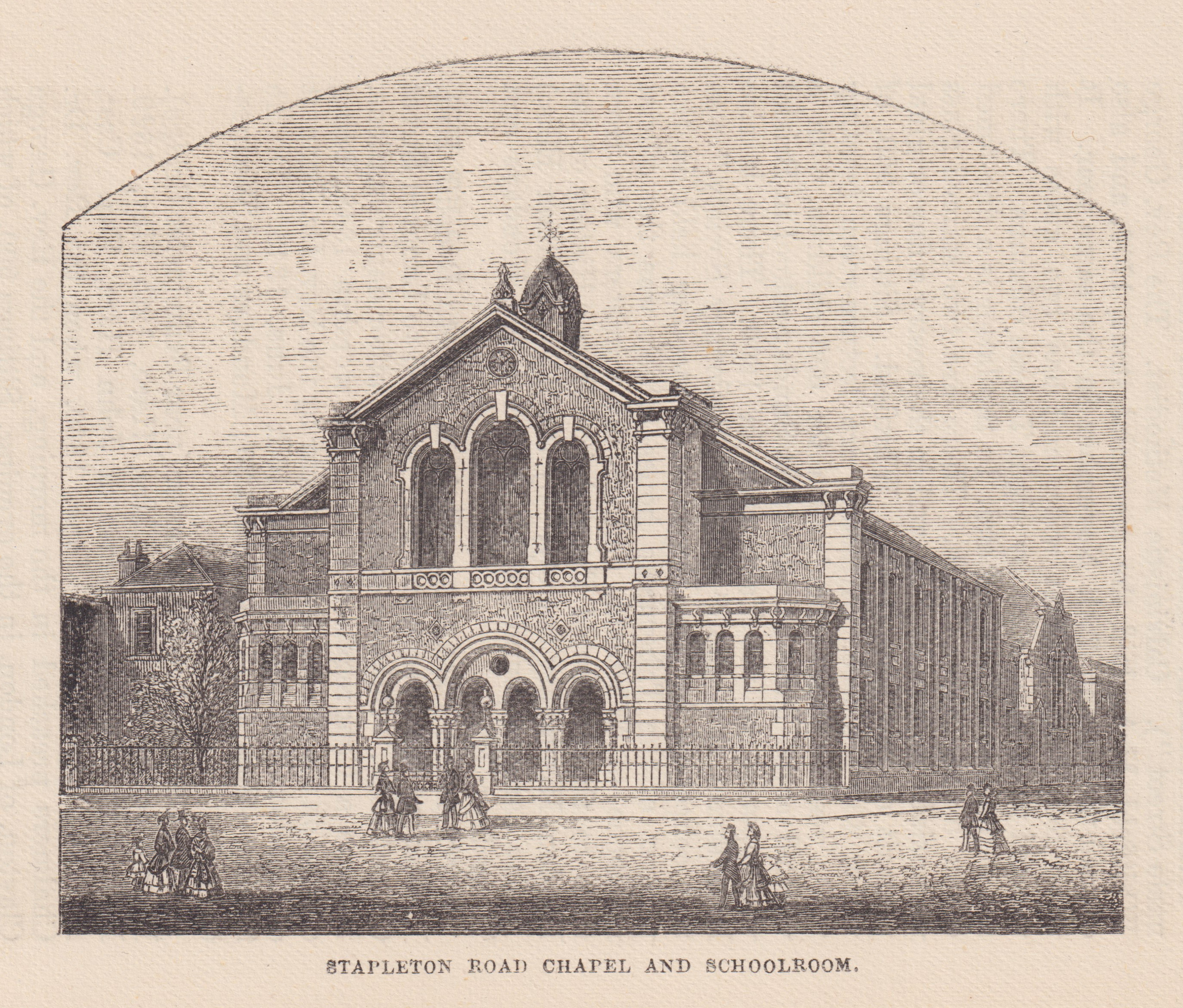
Illustration of the chapel by S. D. Major, 1872. The turret that once existed on the rooftop is depicted here.

Construction of the main chapel began in 1871, with the foundation stone laid on 8 March by H. O. Wills. The building committee adopted a strict policy of avoiding debt, delaying construction until sufficient subscriptions were secured. The chapel was officially opened on 20 October 1871, with the first sermons preached by the Rev. Henry Quick. In an 1872 report, it was noted that the church had raised over £5,500 in its first five years of existence. The building was registered for marriages in February 1873.

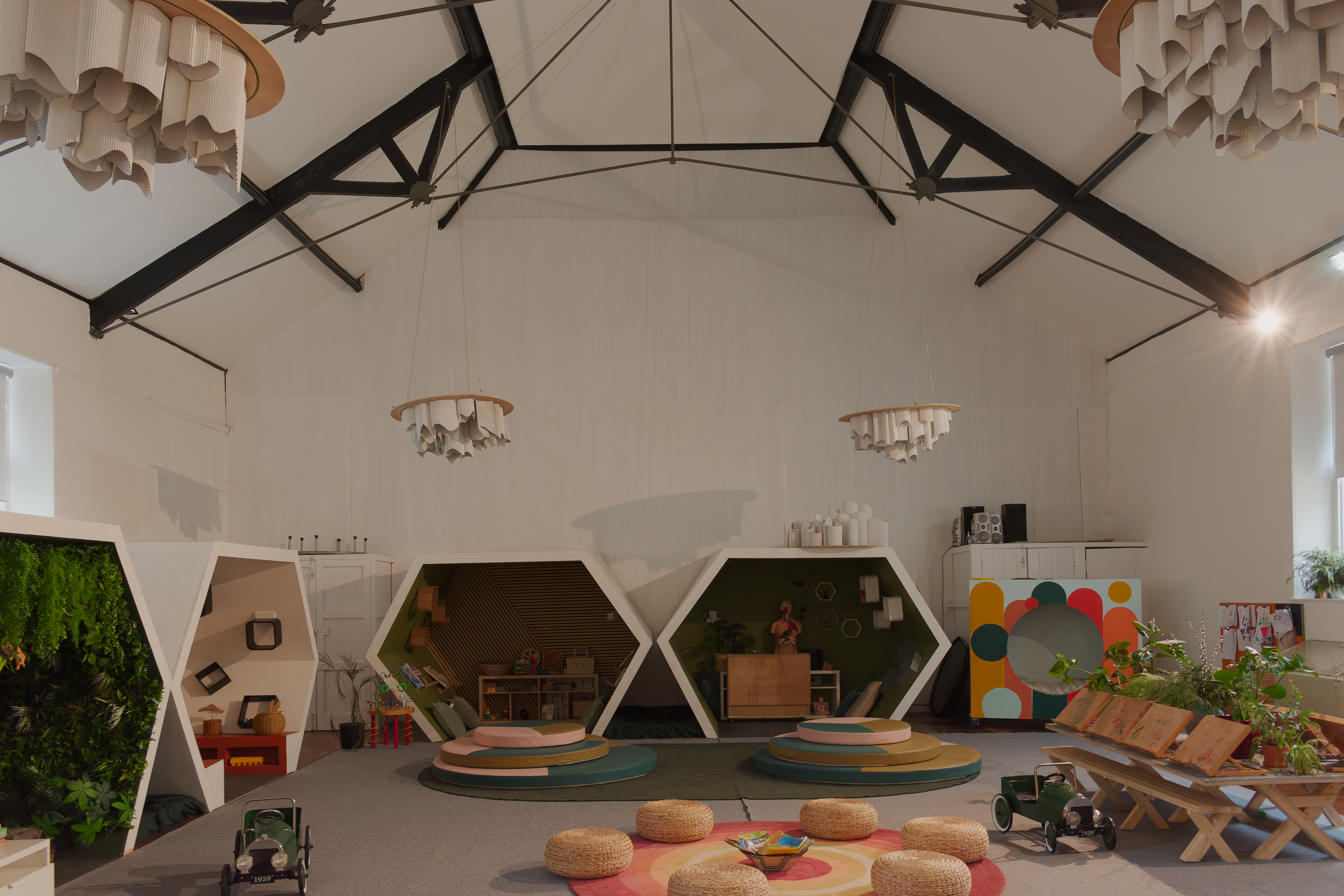
The church hall, currently used to care for young children, which connects to the former Sunday school rooms

By 1872, the Sunday school enrolled over 1,000 children, with a further 400 young adults attending Bible classes. The church also established a Sick Fund Society and a mothers' meeting group to support the poor in the surrounding district. The congregation was active in outreach to "neglected children", running night schools in the Old Workhouse to educate street children. This work expanded with the founding of the nearby Brick Street Mission, a daughter church of the chapel. In 1880, the church was involved in an early test of the Burial Laws Amendment Act 1880; the minister, Rev. W. H. Jellie, successfully negotiated to officiate a funeral in the churchyard of St Mark's Church, Easton, though he eventually declined to perform the rite due to legal ambiguities at the time.

In 1875, the Stapleton Road congregation had entered into a union with the Tabernacle Chapel in Penn Street under the joint pastorate of the Rev. W. Adams. However, the dual pastorate arrangement proved difficult to sustain, and in 1883, the joint minister, Rev. W. H. Jellie, resigned. He cited the impossibility of effectively managing two distinct congregations, and thus the union was eventually dissolved. Following a period without a settled minister, the Rev. J. James was appointed in 1888.

In 1986, under the leadership of Minister David Thomas, the church secured funding through the government's Inner City Pilot Project to refurbish the church hall. A new advice and resource centre was launched that year at a cost of approximately £250,000.

In 1996, the church ended a voluntary work rehabilitation scheme in partnership with HM Prison Leyhill. The decision came after it was revealed that the prison service had sent two offenders, including a child murderer, to work at the church without disclosing the nature of their crimes to the minister.

The chapel underwent repairs and renovation in the early 1990s, re-opening in June 1991. It remains an active place of worship and did not join the United Reformed Church, retaining its Congregational status.

== Architecture ==
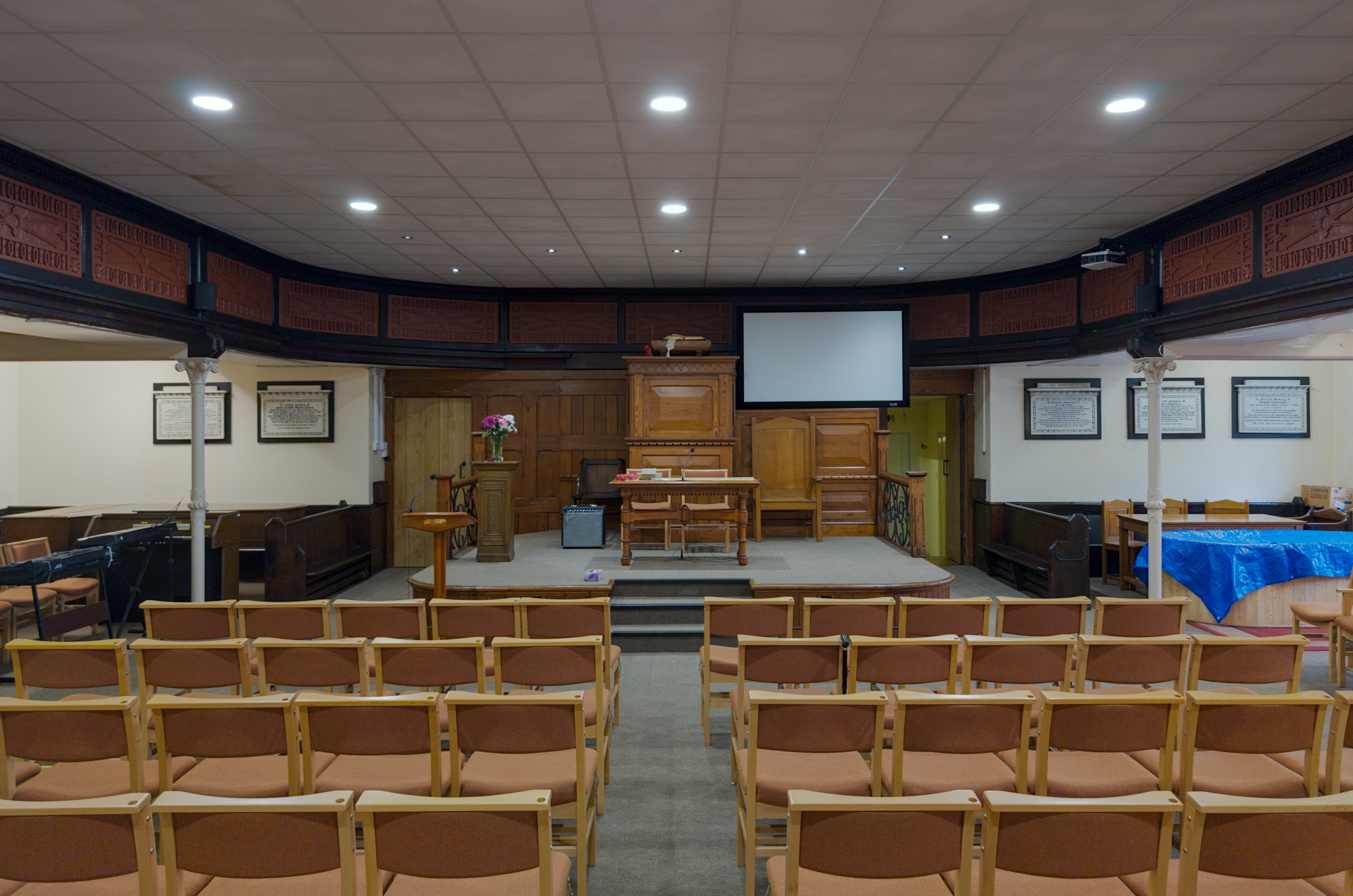
Interior of the church, facing north toward the altar

The chapel was designed by Hans Fowler Price of Weston-super-Mare and built by W. Gorvett of Bristol. The building is constructed in the Italianate style, utilising blue Pennant stone with freestone dressings. The Stapleton Road frontage consists of a recessed porch featuring an arcade of three arches, supported by shafts of polished stone quarried from the Forest of Dean and topped with carved capitals. Above the entrance is a three-light window, surmounted by a gable containing a clock manufactured by Llewellyn and James. The clock face is marked with quarter-hour divisions and once bore the inscription "Time to Seek the Lord". The roofline was originally topped by an ornamental ventilating turret, which has since been removed.

The interior features a wide, single-span roof that covers the width of the building without intermediate walls. It is upheld by two lines of slender iron pillars, which also bear the weight of the galleries that run along the sides and end of the nave. The original seating, capable of accommodating 1,000 congregants, was constructed of varnished pitch pine. A false ceiling has since been installed to cover the width of the redundant galleries for the purpose of lowering heating costs, and the pews have also largely been replaced with chairs.
