= The Playhouse, Weston-super-Mare =

Theatre in England

Coordinates: 51°21′03″N 2°58′44″W

The Playhouse
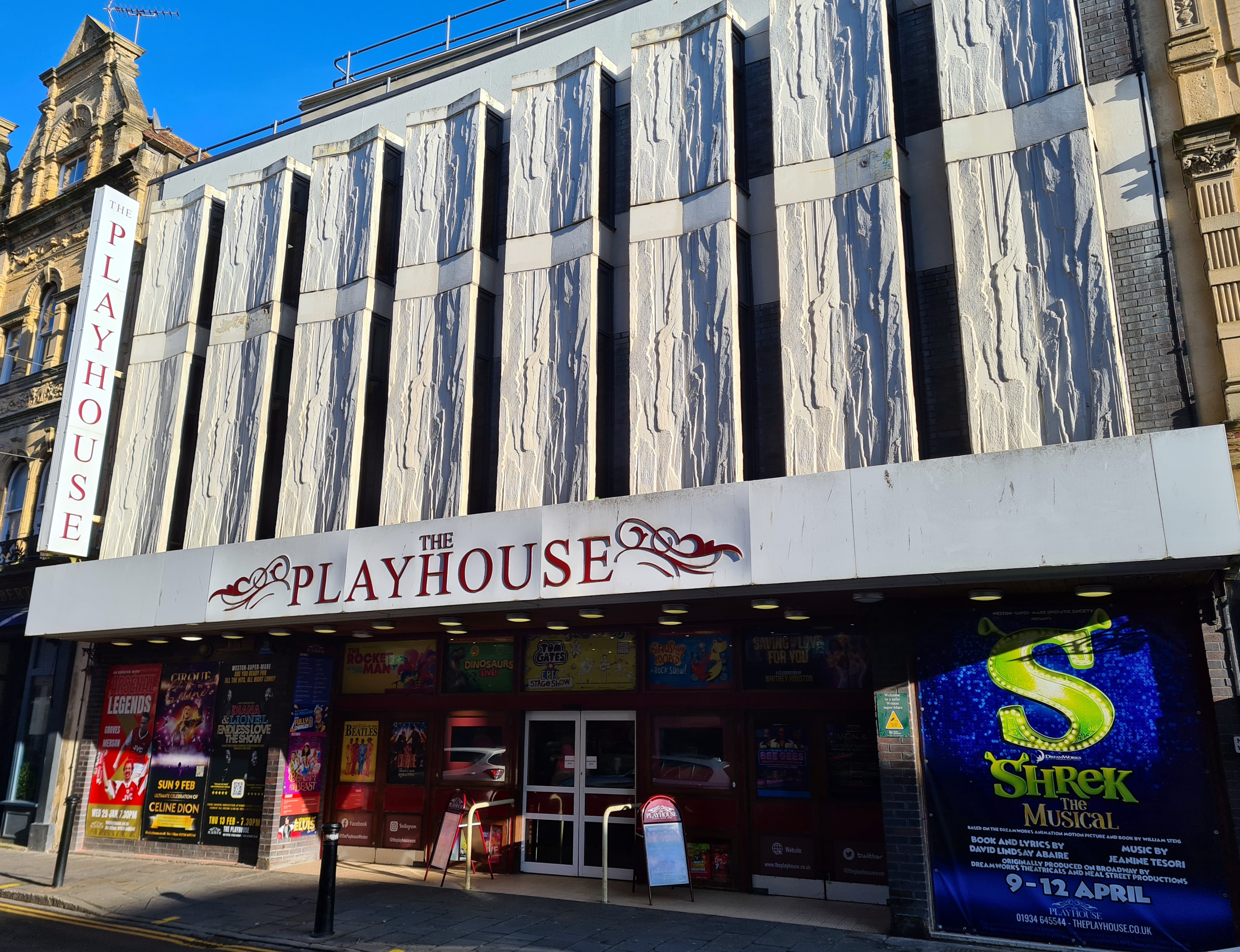
- Interactive map of The Playhouse
- Address: High Street; Weston-super-Mare; England
- Capacity: 664 seats

Construction
- Opened: 1946
- Rebuilt: 1969
- Architect: Hans Price (original building)

Website
- www.theplayhouse.co.uk/

The Playhouse is a 664-seat theatre in Weston-super-Mare, Somerset, South West England that hosts shows all year round including opera, ballet, comedy, music and pantomime performances.

In 1946 an old market building, designed by Hans Price, a local architect, was converted into a 500-seat theatre. For the next 18 years this theatre, The Playhouse, provided the town with a great variety of entertainment. Stars included Frankie Howerd, Bob Monkhouse and Ken Dodd. On 21 August 1964 a fire destroyed most of the theatre and the unsafe structure had to be demolished. In 1969 at a cost of £230,000 a new theatre opened and has been in continuous use ever since. The stage measures 59 feet (18 m) by 28 feet (9 m) and can be extended by covering the orchestra pit.

On 6 June 2007 the theatre staged the world première of Houdini—The Musical, which is based on the life of the escapologist Harry Houdini. The musical includes Houdini's famous trick the Chinese Water Torture Cell.

The theatre suffered a major flooding incident on the evening of 27 April 2017 whilst hosting the North Somerset Schools Dance Festival. A rising water main burst on one of the upper floors leading to the evacuation of over 200 children and over 600 members of the audience. The fire brigade were called with 6 tenders attending to pump out the basement level which was completely flooded.

== Pantomime ==
The following is a list of recent annual pantomimes:

- 1996 - Jack and the Beanstalk starring Keith Harris with puppets Orville the Duck and Cuddles the Monkey
- 1997 - Dick Whittington starring Sophie Lawrence (Eastenders), Simon Parkin (CBBC Presenter), Mike Nolan (Bucks Fizz)
- 1998 - Aladdin starring Stefan Dennis
- 1999 - Snow White and the Seven Dwarves starring Anne Charleston
- 2000 - Cinderella Starring Andrew Linford, Adele Silva, Jack Douglas
- 2001 - Jack and the Beanstalk starring Antonio Fargas, Paul Moriaty and Katy Reeves
- 2002 - Peter Pan starring Derek Griffiths and Sonia
- 2003 - Aladdin starring Peter Amory, Bindya Solanki and John Pickard
- 2004 - Snow White and the Seven Dwarves starring Bernie Clifton, Danielle Nicholls and Kim Hartman
- 2005 - Cinderella starring Jimmy Cricket as Buttons, with children's TV personalities Lucinda Rhodes-Flaherty and Jacqueline Boatswain.
- 2006 - Dick Whittington starring Jeremy Edwards, Anna Kumble and Shaun Williamson
- 2007 - Jack and the Beanstalk starring Bruce Jones and Sue Hodge
- 2008 - Peter Pan with Timmy Mallett and David Griffin
- 2009 - Snow White starring Peter Duncan and Vicki Michelle
- 2010 - Cinderella starring Sean Wilson, Kelle Bryan, John Lyons
- 2011 - Aladdin starring John Challis, Cat Sandion, Craig Daniel Adams, Simmons and Simmons
- 2012 - Sleeping Beauty starring Lorraine Chase
- 2013 - Jack and the Beanstalk starring George Sampson
- 2014 - Peter Pan starring Dean Gaffney, Gemma Bissex, Jordan Fox, Sophie Adams
- 2015 - Cinderella starring Joe Swash, Sophie Adams
- 2016 - Beauty and the Beast starring John Challis
- 2017 - Aladdin starring John Altman (Eastenders)
- 2018 - Snow White and the Seven Dwarves starring Linda Lusardi
- 2019 - Cinderella starring Linda Lusardi
- 2020 - Sleeping Beauty
- 2021 - Jack And The Beanstalk
- 2022 - Sleeping Beauty starring Vicki Michelle
- 2023 - Dick Whittington starring Linda Lusardi
