= Weston Museum =

Museum in North Somerset, England

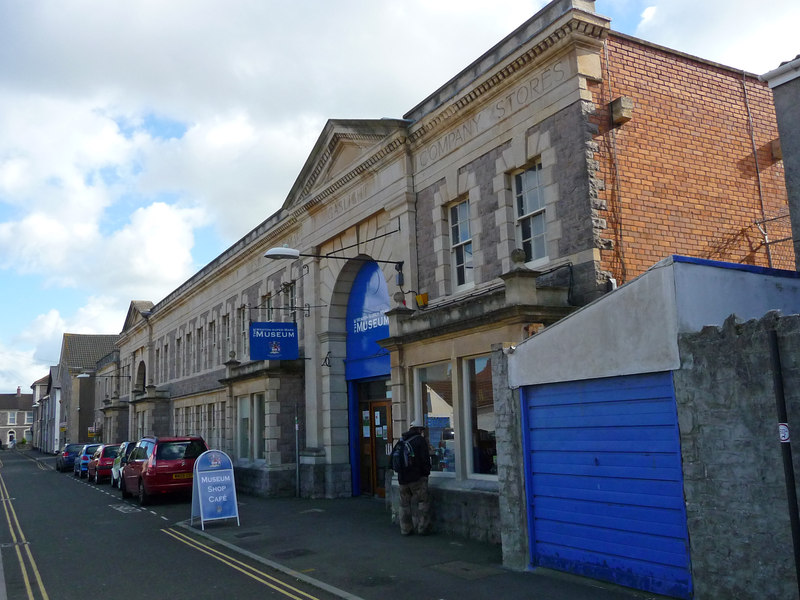
- The museum's main entrance

- Location within North Somerset and the United Kingdom
- Established: 1861
- Location: Burlington Street, Weston-super-Mare, North Somerset, England, BS23 1PR
- Coordinates: 51.349097°N 2.975176°W
- Website: Weston Museum

Weston Museum is a museum in Weston-super-Mare, North Somerset, England. It was established in 1861. It is home to Weston Town Council museum collection with exhibits relating to Weston-super-Mare and the surrounding area from 400 million years ago to the present day.

== History ==
Weston Museum was founded in 1861 by William Mable. A shoemaker by trade, Mable came to Weston-super-Mare from London prior to the 1851 census.

In 1851 the Reverend R Warre instigated an archaeological investigation of the camp of Celtic Britons on Worlebury Hill. Mable was fascinated by the excavations but was disappointed that the findings were transported to the museum at Taunton thereby not allowing local people to see them.

He began to put together a collection of "specimens of natural history" with his aim being, "to secure a museum for the town of Weston, free to the public at all reasonable times".

Following concern about the ill-educated donkey boys in the town, Mable opened a night school in rooms on the town's Carlton Street with the support of a Miss Salter. Here the boys could receive education and support. He was also sensitive to rapid changes taking place in the town and started to collect ephemera from times past. He amassed a collection too large for his workman's cottage and in 1861 he gave the collection to the president and committee of the Night School with the objective of it becoming the museum of the town, on the condition that a proper place was provided to display it.

In 1863 he established the town's first museum in the Albert Memorial Hall, next to Emmanuel Church. The church had raised money to build a hall in memory of the late Prince Albert and the Night School collection moved in. One of his 'social betters' wrote a vindictive letter to the town's local newspaper, the Weston Mercury, asking why a mere cobbler should be allowed to run a museum, but others wrote of him as "an unusually intelligent working man". Four years later the hall was extended to include a workers' institute, superintendent's house, and museum.

William Mable died in 1887. His broader vision of a Public Museum finally came to pass in 1901. During the previous year, the museum moved from the Albert Memorial Hall to the first floor of the purpose-built Free Library and Museum in the town's Boulevard. This 'vaguely Renaissance-style, red Cattybrook brick building' was designed by local architects Hans Fowler Price and Sydney Wilde. The new building was partly paid for by public subscription and partly by a bequest of Mr Frederick Wood of Chew Magna, who donated his valuable reference library to the town, with an estimated worth of £4,000.

In 1975, the museum was moved to its present location in the site of the former offices and showrooms of the Weston Gaslight Company in Burlington Street. Collections were moved from the upper floor of the Public Library and was renamed 'The Woodspring Museum'. New galleries were opened and in 1985 the museum acquired a Victorian cottage standing adjacent to the eastern end of the building. This cottage was named Clara's Cottage.

From 1996, North Somerset Council took over from Woodspring and the museum was renamed "The Time Machine" until 2002, when its name changed again to "The North Somerset Museum".

Weston-super-Mare Town Council acquired the Burlington Street building in 2011 and in 2012 a bid was made to the Heritage Lottery Fund to make major improvements. The bid was successful and the museum closed its doors to the public in April 2015 so work could begin on a major redesign. The museum also adopted its present name, "Weston Museum" and re-opened on 26 August 2017.

The redevelopment of the museum included the addition of a gallery for hosting temporary and travelling exhibitions, which has been named the William Mable Gallery in his honour.

== Today's building ==
The present home of Weston Museum is the former industrial premises of the Weston Gaslight Company. It is a Grade II listed building. It was designed and built by local architects Hans Fowler Price and William Jane in 1912 to house the company's stores and distribution workshops, incorporating an existing stable yard in its construction. During the 1970s, many Victorian buildings in Weston were demolished and replaced with apartment blocks. Weston Civic Society was formed during this decade to raise awareness and appreciation of the beauty and elegance of Weston's Victorian landscape in the hope fewer buildings would fall to redevelopment plans.

The Gaslight Company Workshops was one such building that was saved from demolition. It was purchased by Weston Borough Council and turned into a new home for the museum. In 1975, the local council converted the workshop into a new museum and the facility was reopened on 30 June that year.

In 2010 there were plans to close and sell the whole Burlington Street museum site and move displays to a small section of the Winter Gardens premise on the seafront. Local campaigners including Clara's grand nephew, Brian Austin, fought against the move. In 2012 Weston-super-Mare Town Council took over the building with the plan to develop and refurbish the museum for the community and for visitors of the town.

=== Refurbishment ===
The refurbishment of Weston Museum is the biggest project that Weston Town Council has undertaken.

The project would not have been possible without the contribution of a variety of grant funding bodies, including but not limited to the Heritage Lottery Fund and Arts Council England.

Friends of Weston Museum, a local residents organisation that promotes and supports the museum, were instrumental in saving the museum from closure. Members wrote letters to councillors, local newspapers, organised a march, and lobbied council meetings. They were "delighted" when Weston Town Council agreed to take over the running of the museum. In July 2015 the group was awarded charity status by the Charity Commission. In December 2016 they were awarded a large grant that was donated to the Museum Regeneration fund.

The Lottery Fund has been the biggest contributor, granting £1.1 million in 2015 towards redevelopment. This sum was £346,000 more than the town council initially asked for. Preliminary funding came during 2013 in the form of a £72,000 grant to investigate redevelopment options and create a sound business model for a refurbished museum. Design consultants Imagemakers and local Somerset architects Messrs Chedburn & Dudley were commissioned to draw up plans. Nerys Watts, Head of the Heritage Lottery Fund South West in 2015, described the plans as "a transformational project for Weston-Super-Mare." [sic?]

In total at least 7 organisations contributed toward the regeneration fund:

Source	Contribution
Heritage Lottery Fund	£1.1 million
Arts Council England	£52,000
Coastal Revival Fund	£50,000
Garfield Trust	£30,000
Fairfield Trust	£15,000
Anonymous	£15,000
Weston Society of Arts	£3,330

The £52,000 award by Arts Council England was a 'Resilience Fund', a grant for the museum to appoint café, retail, and audience development consultants. These consultants would advise the redevelopment project on how to establish a "unique visitor destination within an economically sustainable business", so that town council subsidy could be kept as low as possible. In December 2016 Arts Council England also provided a grant of an additional £15,000 to fund two new art projects. The first was the creation of a series of high-impact art installations for the revamped courtyard, produced by artist Mary Flower. The second was a series of collaborative workshops enabling local schools and community groups to help create an "eye-catching" wood print mural. Malcolm Nicholson, Town Clerk at this time, described this support as "fantastic".

The council has plans to start a second phase of museum refurbishment which will include Clara's Cottage and an original 1860s mews cottage façade that forms part of the museum's rear courtyard.

== Exhibits ==
The museum has four permanent galleries with key objects from the collections, including geology, archaeology, art, and social history. There are two spaces for temporary exhibitions, the William Mable Gallery and the Community Gallery. Since refurbishment in 2017 the William Mable gallery has featured four temporary exhibitions (as of October 2018).

Exhibition	Description	Start date	End date
Making Weston Museum	The museum's redevelopment	26 August 2017	13 January 2018
The Art of Self-Expression	Facial hair and tattoos through the ages	27 January 2018	13 May 2018
That's The Way To Do It: Punch and Judy Through The Ages	The history of Punch and Judy	26 May 2018	16 September 2018
Alfred Leete: The Man Behind the Icon	Weston man who created the ‘Your Country Needs You’ poster.	29 September 2018	13 January 2019

The 'Community Gallery' provides a space to 'explore, share and offer an understanding of modern society in Weston-super-Mare', enabled by a Heritage Lottery Fund 'Sharing Heritage' grant of £10,000 in 2017. It is a completely volunteer led initiative, under the supervision of the museum's Community Liaison Officer. The first exhibit to feature was a display about the town's Greek community. This was chosen as this community represents the largest ethnic minority group in Weston. This was followed by an exhibit about the North Somerset BME (black and minority ethnic) Network. From October 2018, the gallery included an exhibition about the Uphill Village Society. Forthcoming subjects include links between the West Country and the Spanish Civil War, Pride, and the Citizen's Advice Bureau.

=== Literary festival ===
Weston Town Council intends to develop the museum as an arts and cultural facility for the benefit of the local community and visitors to the town. In Spring 2018 the museum was co-host to Weston's first literary festival, which ran from 22 February to 1 March, coinciding with World Book Day. Writers who featured in the event include Amanda Prowse, Huw Powell and Lord Jeffrey Archer, who grew up in Weston.

The festival returned in February 2019, with speakers including writer and broadcaster Christina Patterson, the children's authors Claire Barker and Duncan Beedie, and the women's rights activist Dr Helen Pankhurst.

=== Clara's Cottage ===
In 1985, the museum acquired a Victorian cottage standing next door to the eastern end of the building. Between 1901 and 1985 this had been lived in by successive members of the Payne family. Clara Payne lived there between 1901 and 1952. She brought in extra income by letting out one room to lodgers. In honour of the former resident the cottage was named Clara's Cottage. It opened to public visitors in June 1987.

When the Council bought the cottage the aim was to restore it to how it looked at the turn of the nineteenth century and to recreate three main rooms – the kitchen, parlour, and the lodger's bedroom. Nearly all the items in Clara's Cottage were donated by local people or came from North Somerset properties. The dresser in the kitchen is original to the cottage. It has also been adapted to showcase the museum's collection of antique toys.

=== Rusty the iron age dog ===
The official mascot of Weston Museum is 'Rusty the Iron Age Dog', a canine character based on the skeleton remains of a pair of dogs that were discovered in Christon during excavations for the construction of the M5 motorway. The two dogs are believed to be between 2100 and 2600 years old and were found at the feet of a 25-35-year-old man in an Iron Age burial site. The skeleton remains are now on display in the museum's 'Living Landscape' gallery. 'Rusty' gained his name through a public competition in January 2016. The winning name was chosen through a combination of votes and for honouring Rusty's Iron Age heritage. The mascot currently gives his name to the Weston branch of the Young Archaeologists' Club which meets at the museum.
