= Jeff Gillette =

Contemporary American artist (born 1959)

Jeff Gillette (born 1959) is a contemporary American artist based in Southern California. His work is known for combining consumer images with dystopian themes. His "slumscape" paintings were featured in Banksy’s 2015 Dismaland installation.

== Influences ==
Gillette was born in 1959 and grew up in the suburbs of Detroit, Michigan. He cited the TV show "The Wonderful World of Disney" as an early source of creative inspiration. During a 1978 visit to Disneyland, he reportedly found the park's atmosphere unconvincing and left after 30-minutes. As an artist, he remained interested in Disney characters, especially Mickey Mouse.

Gillette dropped out of college in 1982 and traveled widely, visiting locations including the Himalayas and Calcutta, India (present-day Kolkata). He later became a volunteer with the Peace Corps. Many of the "slumscapes" he paints are directly inspired by the residential slums he witnessed in his travels.

After moving for a teaching position in Orange County, California (where Disneyland is based), he began painting works that combined imagery of residential slums with Disney characters.

Gillette has cited German philosopher Arthur Schopenhauer as an influence. He has described his work as "taking the things people love and imposing the worst-case scenario [on them]".

== Exhibitions ==
Gillette has exhibited his work since 1997, with his first solo show at Broadway Gallery in Santa Ana, California.

The style for which he is currently known emerged in a solo show called "Slumscapes – Blasphemy Blowout", which depicted American fast-food restaurants such as McDonald's against backdrops of slums and well-known cartoon figures juxtaposed with religious iconography.

In 2010, Gillette held a solo show at Copro Gallery in Santa Monica titled "Dismayland," which attracted the attention of British artist Banksy. The exhibition marked the beginning of the style for which he later became recognized.

In 2017, he mounted a solo show at Gregorio Escalante Gallery in Los Angeles called "Total Dismay", which turned the exhibition space into an "art landfill". In the show, he premiered a series of new paintings mounted on walls and priced for thousands of dollars, while the floor was littered with paper prints that patrons would walk on top of and which were on sale for $5.

== Dismaland ==
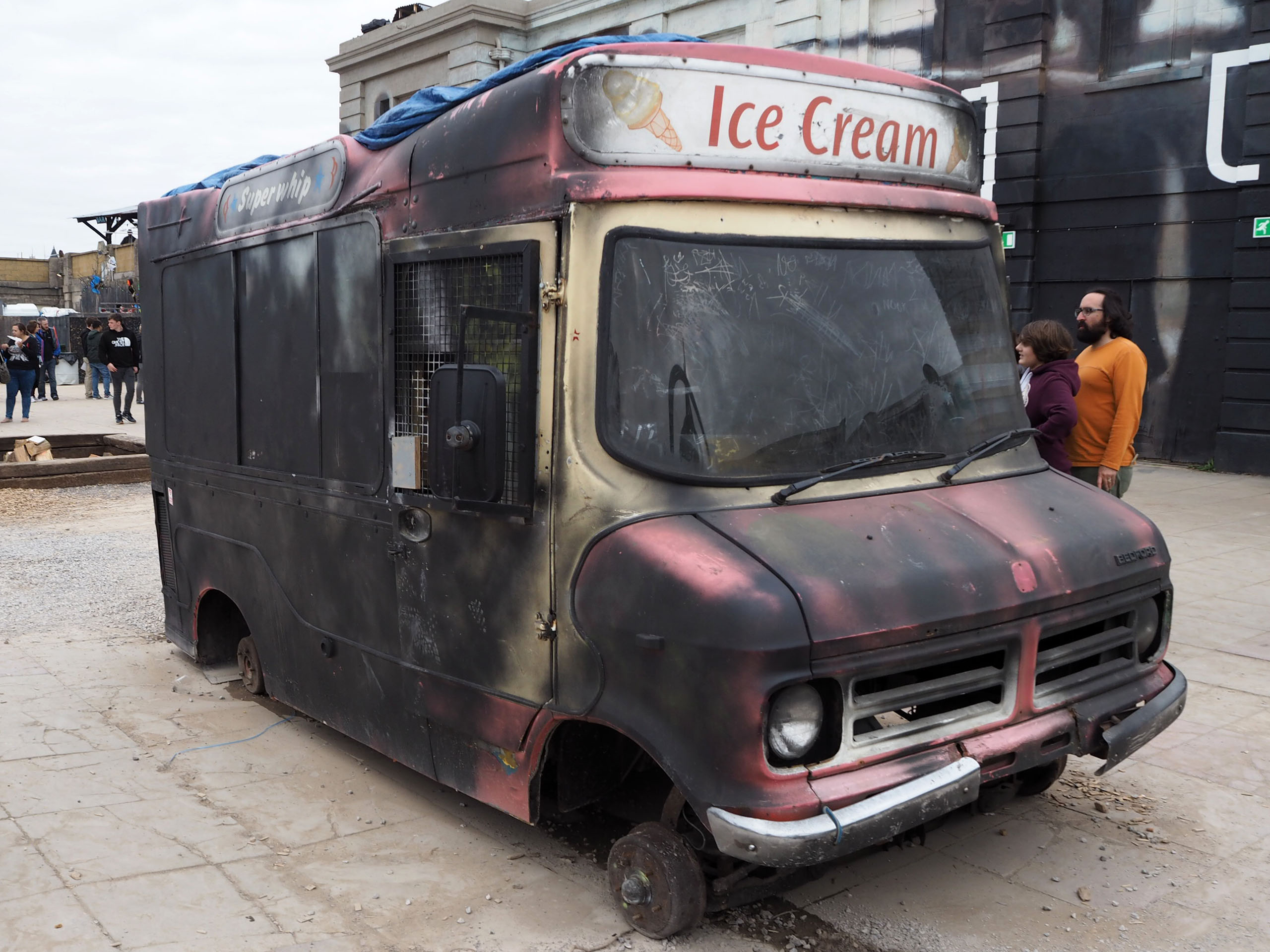
2015-09-20 Dismaland

In Spring 2015, Banksy contacted Gillette through his manager to purchase a “Minnie Hiroshima” painting. He then invited Gillette to participate in a group exhibition called Dismaland, a temporary art project organized by Banksy and built in the resort town of Weston-super-Mare.

The temporary exhibition was built as a parody of the Disneyland theme park. Described by Banksy as a "family theme park unsuitable for children." It ran from August 21 to September 27, 2015.

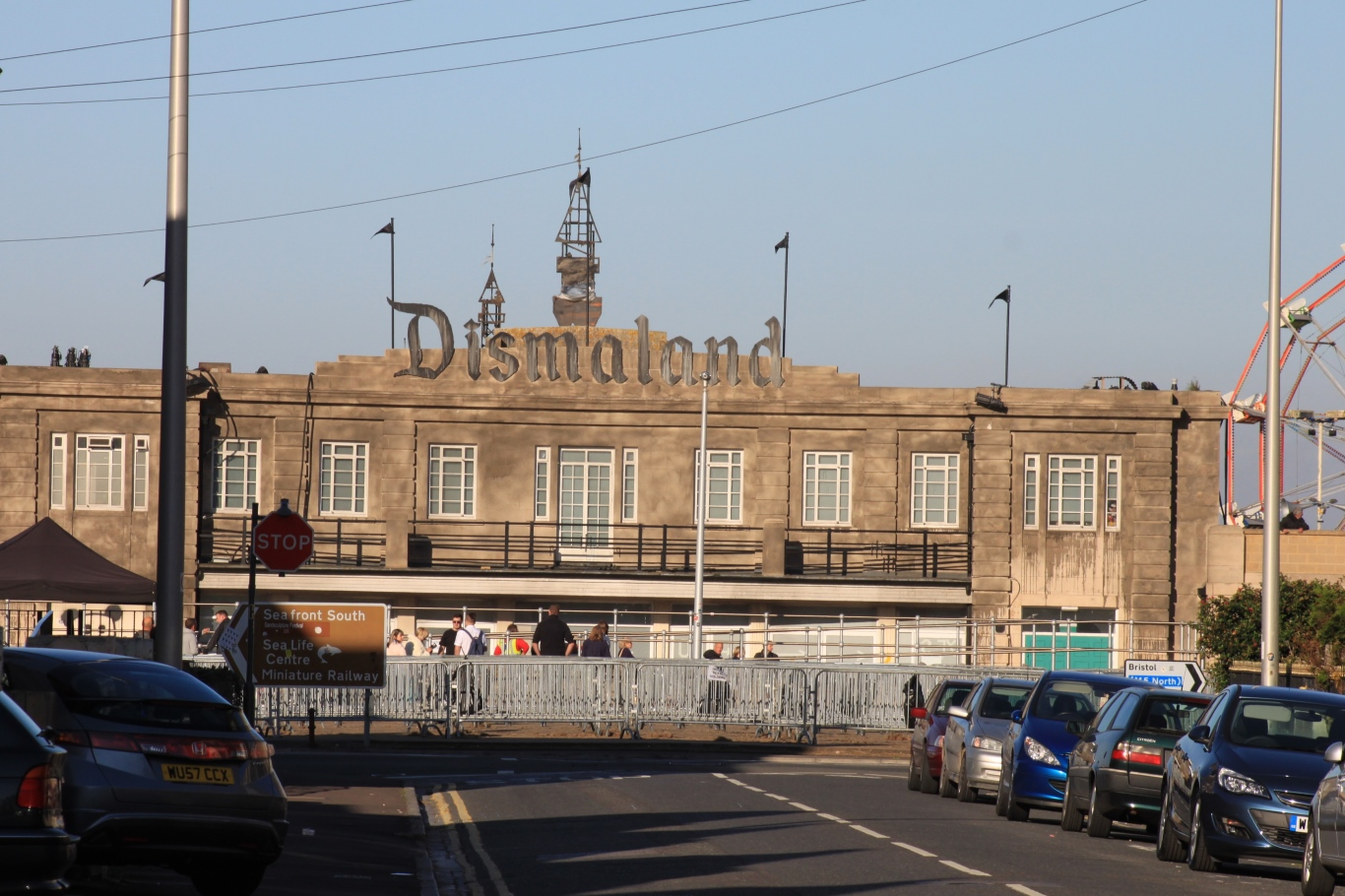
Dismaland from Clevedon Road

The exhibition featured 58 artists, including Bill Barminski, Damien Hirst, Jenny Holzer, Peter Kennard, and Ben Long. Gillette premiered six new paintings on canvas as part of his Dismaland series. Ten new works were created by Banksy, he also funded the construction of the exhibition himself. Approximately 4,000 tickets were available for sale per day, priced at £3 each.
