= Dismaland =

2015 art installation at Weston-super-Mare, England, by Banksy and others

- Date: 21 August – 27 September 2015
- Location: Weston-super-Mare, Somerset, England; 51.3409°N 2.9828°W
- Theme: Art exhibition
- Organised by: Banksy
- Website: www.dismaland.co.uk

Dismaland was a temporary art project organised by street artist Banksy in the seaside resort of Weston-super-Mare in Somerset, England. Prepared in secret, the pop-up exhibition at the Tropicana, a disused lido, was "a sinister twist on Disneyland" that opened during the weekend of 21 August 2015 and closed on 27 September 2015, 36 days later. Banksy described it as a "family theme park unsuitable for children." The aesthetic of the "bemusement park" was potentially inspired by the "Dismayland" series of paintings created by American artist Jeff Gillette, who also participated in the exhibition.

Banksy created ten new works and funded the construction of the exhibition himself. The show featured 58 artists of the 60 Banksy originally invited to participate. 4,000 tickets were available for purchase per day, priced at £3 each. It received 150,000 visitors in the five-week period it was open. After it closed, the building material for the project was repurposed as shelters for refugees in the Calais Jungle where he also added murals.

== Development ==
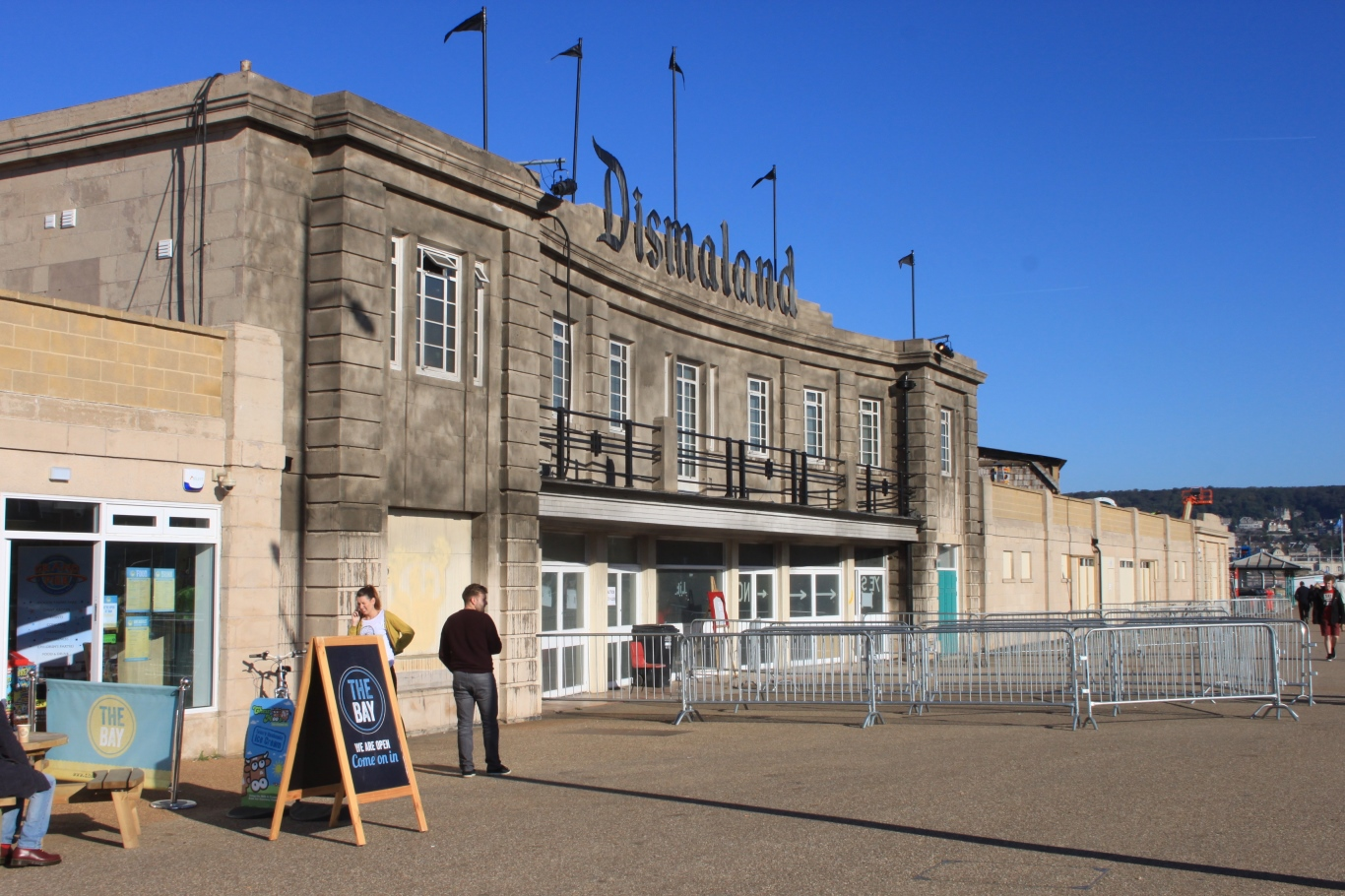
The 'Tropicana' swimming pool that became 'Dismaland'

Local residents of Weston-super-Mare were told that a Hollywood company called Atlas Entertainment was using the location to film a crime thriller called Grey Fox. Signs proclaiming "Grey Fox Productions" were posted around entrances to the site. Pictures of its construction began surfacing online in early August 2015, and included a "fairy castle and massive sculptures". Holly Cushing, whose name appeared in the credits of a documentary about Banksy and who is often reported to be his manager, was sighted at the construction site before the opening, which made the project less of a "secret".

== Works ==
Among the structures photographed prior to the opening were a large pinwheel by Banksy, Horse Scaffolding Sculpture by Ben Long, and a twisted truck sculpture, Big Rig Jig by artist Mike Ross which was previously shown at Burning Man in 2007. Works by 58 artists, including Jenny Holzer, Damien Hirst, Jeff Gillette, Jimmy Cauty and Bill Barminski were featured in the park. Banksy said he contacted the "best artists I could imagine" to exhibit, two of whom turned him down.

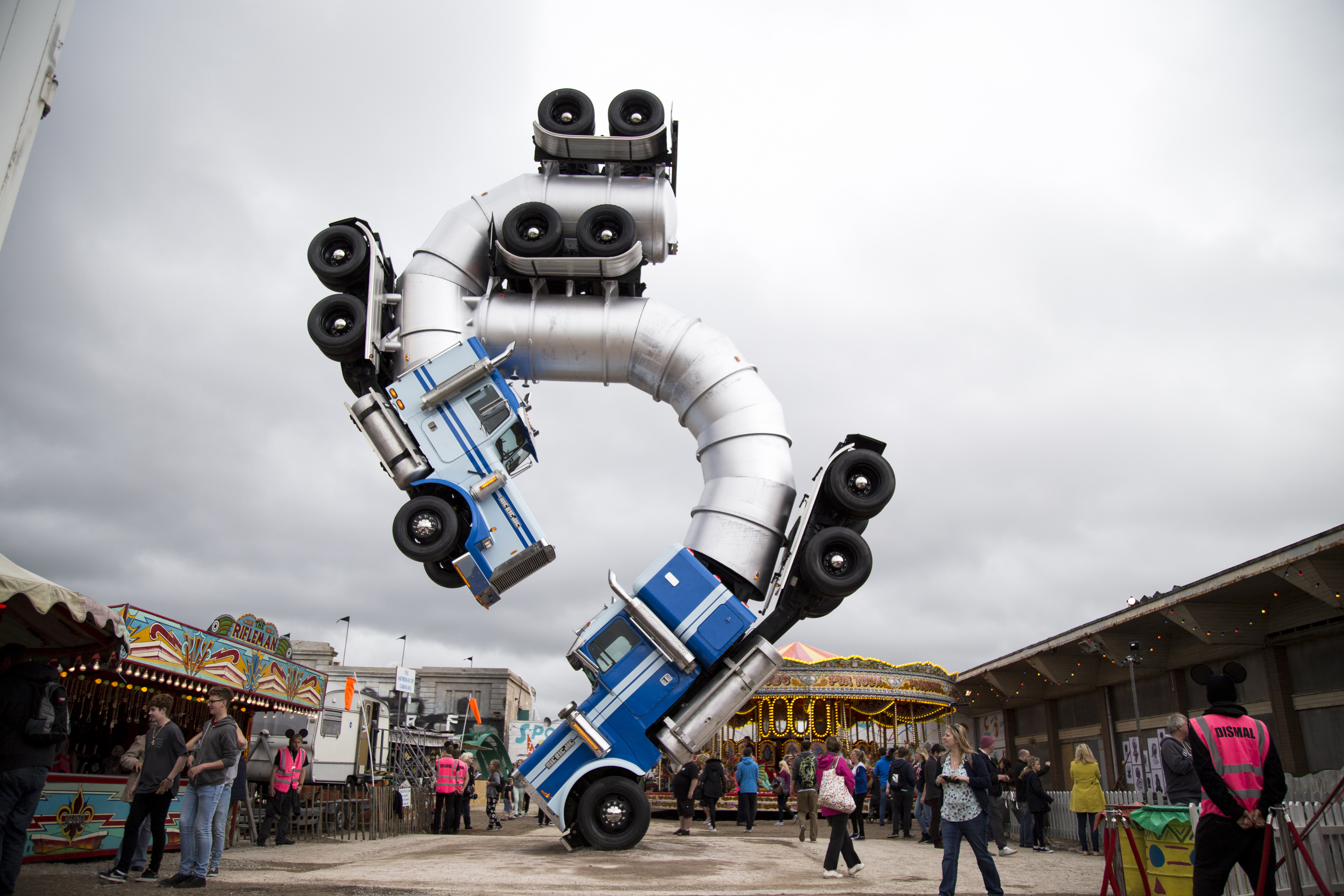
Big Rig Jig at Dismaland in 2015

Art Historian Dr Gavin Grindon from the University of Essex curated Dismaland's political exhibits, including a bus housing a collection of dangerous and violent objects (from homeless spikes to riot shields and rubber bullets) under the banner of 'Cruel Designs'.

A fake payday loan shop for kids called Pocket Money Loans by Darren Cullen was open next to the children's sand pit. Offering kids an "advance on their pocket money at 5000% interest", the floor had a trampoline installed so the children could jump high enough to read the small print on their credit agreements.

The artist and engineer Tim Hunkin and Andy Plant created The Astronauts Caravan ride for the theme park. Visitors sat in the centre of the caravan while outside a steward turned a wheel to rotate the entire caravan around them, producing an optical illusion that the visitors themselves were spinning inside a static room.

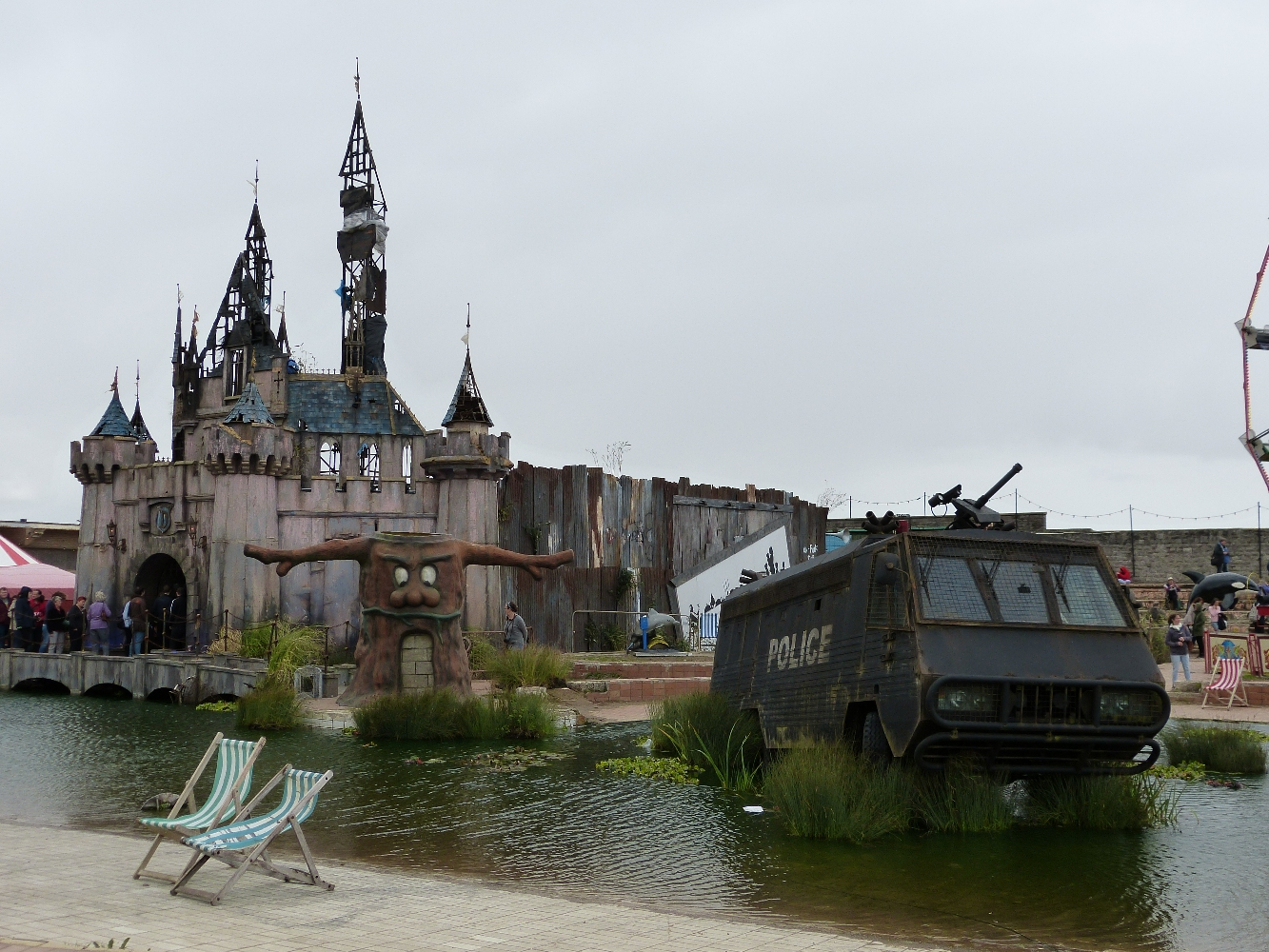
Water Cannon Creek

For one exhibit, the books of Jeffrey Archer, Baron Archer of Weston-super-Mare, a British novelist and former politician who served a prison sentence for perjury, were burned each day in a fire pit. Every one of the estimated 150,000 visitors to the park entered through a fake cardboard, handpainted security check point created by artist Bill Barminski. On Fridays there were scheduled performances by musicians including Run the Jewels, De La Soul, Damon Albarn, and Pussy Riot.

Banksy's coin-operated Dream Boat, created for Dismaland, was donated by the artist to the NGO Help Refugees (now known as Choose Love) in the run-up to Christmas 2018 to help raise money for the charity. The artwork was displayed in Help Refugees' London pop-up shop and members of the public could pay £2 to enter a competition to guess the weight of the piece. The person whose guess was closest to the actual weight would win Dream Boat. The 'guess-the-weight' competition was seen as 'deliberately school fair' in style.

== Contributors ==
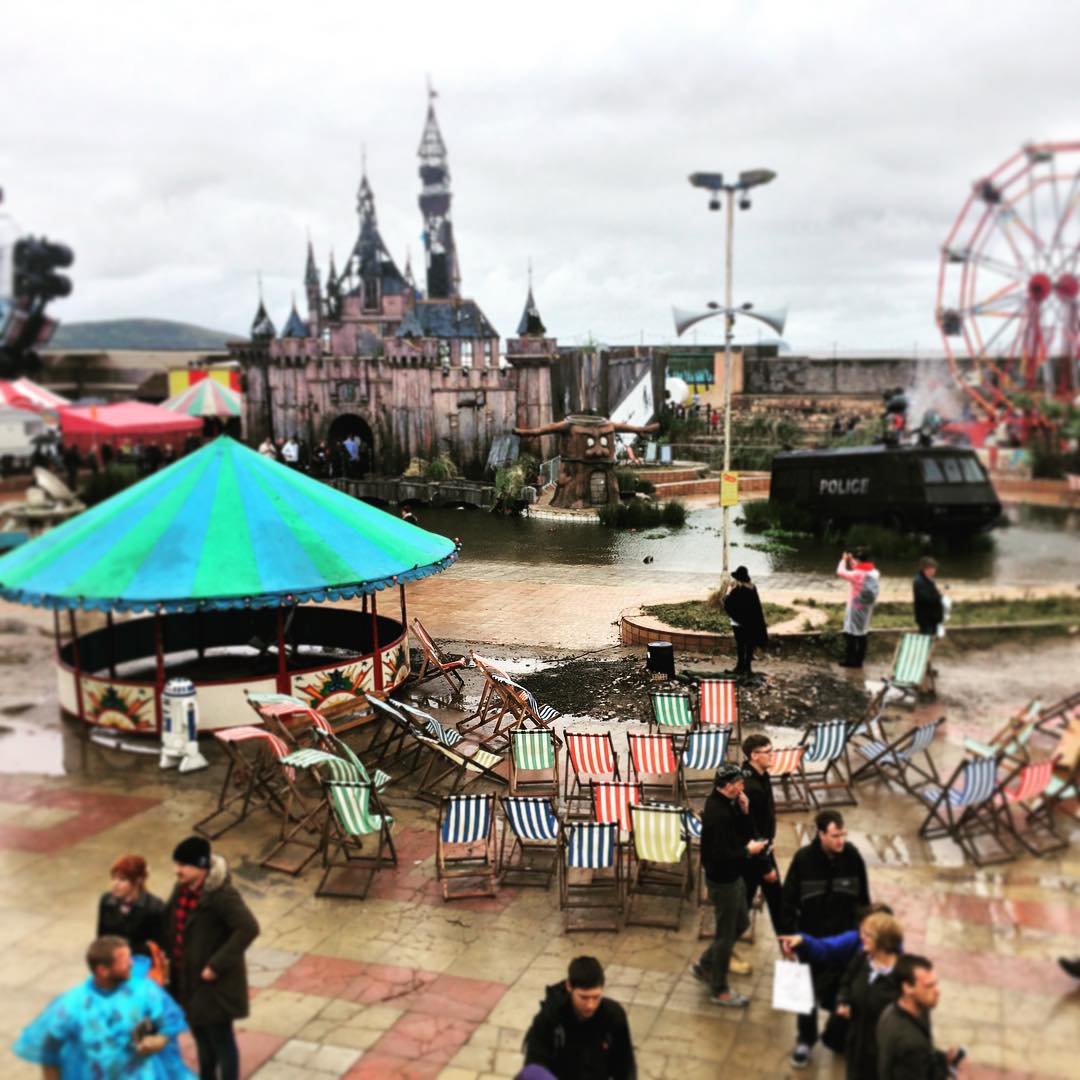
Inside Dismaland

Contributors of artworks included:

- Banksy
- Bill Barminski
- Julie Burchill
- Jimmy Cauty
- Darren Cullen
- El Teneen
- Espo
- Ed Hall
- Greg Haberny
- Jeff Gillette
- Damien Hirst
- Jenny Holzer
- Tim Hunkin
- Andreas Hykade
- Paul Insect
- Peter Kennard
- Josh Keyes
- Jani Leinonen
- Ben Long
- Lush
- Polly Morgan
- Mana Neyestani
- Mike Ross
- David Shrigley

A full list was published on the Dismaland Web site.

Contributor Shadi Alzaqzouq from Palestine covered up his work with a bedsheet bearing a slogan in protest at the presence of Israeli artists; the covered work remained in place. The work was uncovered days later with a statement by the artist.

Musical guests for the opening night of Dismaland included DJs Breakbeat Lou, Peanut Butter Wolf, and DJ Yoda, along with a surprise appearance by rapper Mos Def (now known as Yasiin Bey).

== Reception ==
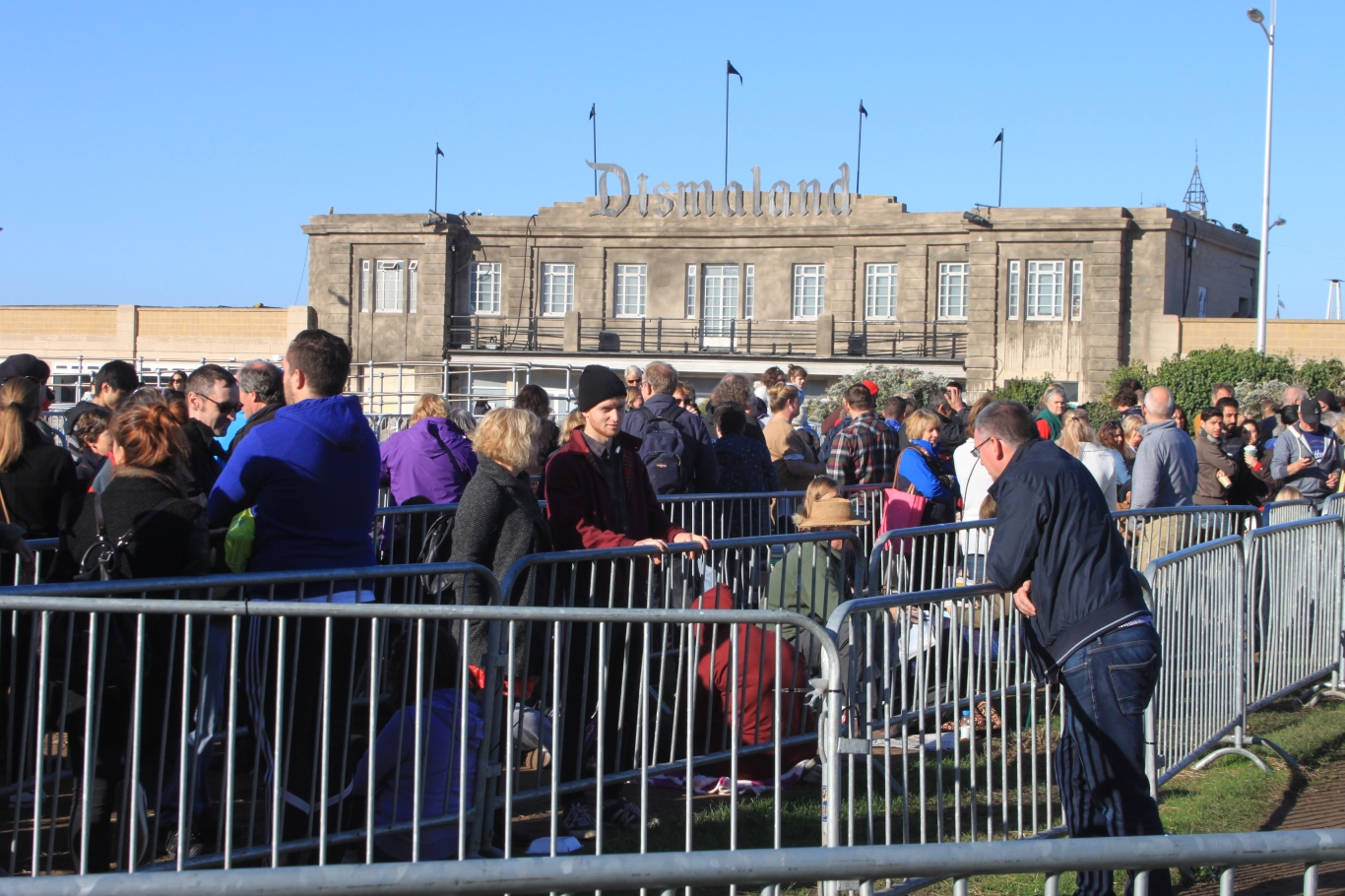
Visitors queuing for tickets

High demand for tickets to the exhibition caused the Dismaland website to crash repeatedly. Some wondered whether or not this was deliberately contrived by Banksy as part of the irony of the Dismaland experience.

Many celebrities were attracted to the venue, some international, such as Brad Pitt, Jack Black, Neil Patrick Harris, Nicholas Hoult, Wayne Coyne, Russell Brand, Ant & Dec, Mark Ronson, Darren Criss, Daddy G, CGP Grey and Brady Haran.

The exhibit had a mixed reception from critics. Jonathan Jones in the Guardian found it depressing: "brings together a lot of bad art by the seaside." Dan Brooks in The New York Times was critical of the easy sarcasm.

The exhibition proved to be popular with visitors, with many prepared to queue for hours each day for one of the 500 daily walk-in tickets. It brought in 150,000 visitors from around the world, boosting the local economy of Weston-super-Mare by £20m.

In May 2016, it was announced that Dismaland had been shortlisted for the South Bank Sky Arts Award.

== See also ==
- See Monster
- List of works by Banksy
