= See Monster =

Art installation in North Somerset, England

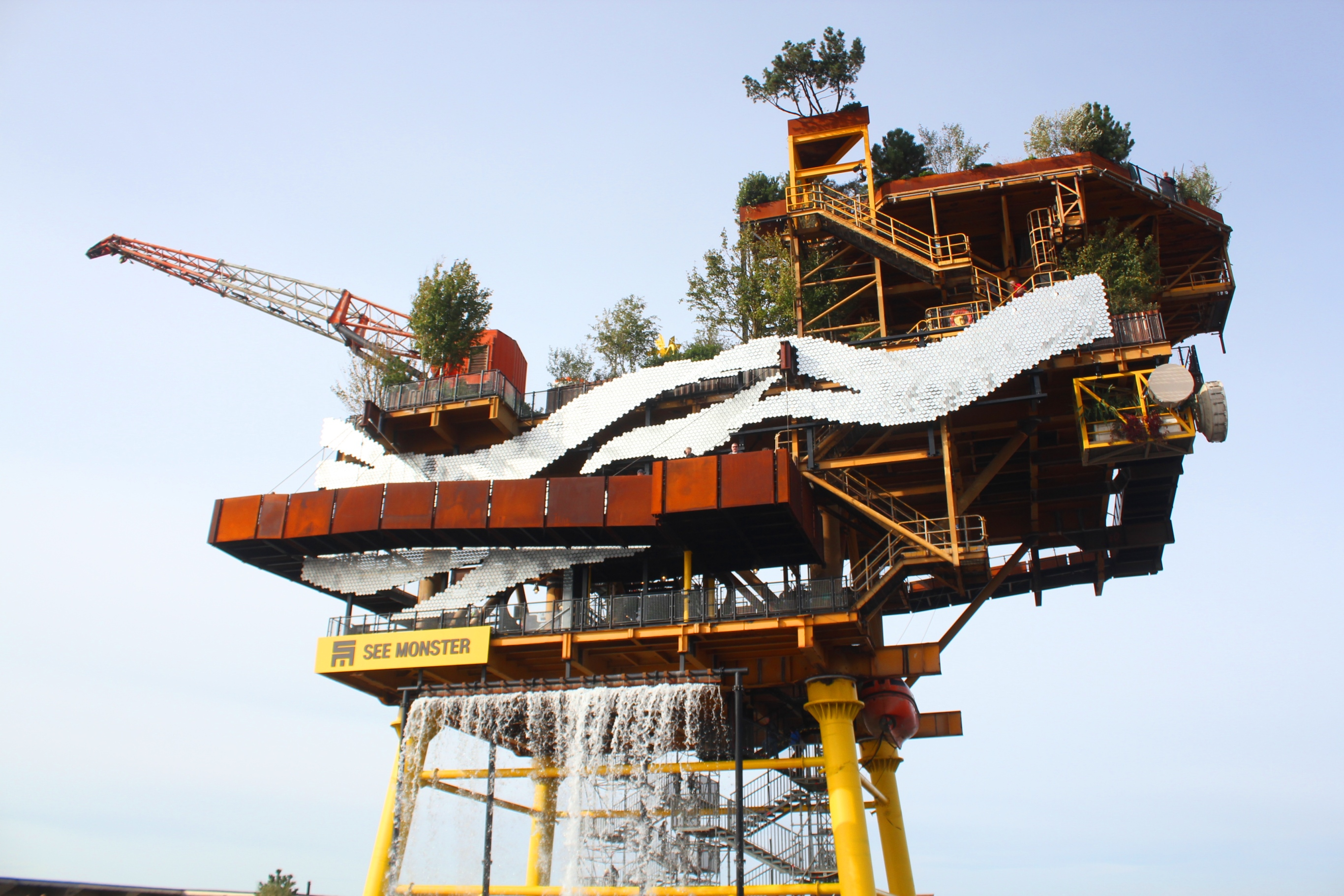
- Date: 23 September – 20 November 2022
- Location: Weston-super-Mare, Somerset, England; 51.3409°N 2.9828°W
- Theme: Art exhibition
- Organised by: NewSubstance; Unboxed: Creativity in the UK
- Website: seemonster.co.uk

See Monster (stylised in all capitals) was a temporary outdoor art installation in Weston-super-Mare, England. It was part of the nationwide arts festival Unboxed: Creativity in the UK and consisted of a converted decommissioned offshore platform featuring a garden and artworks that promoted sustainability.

Along with the wider Unboxed festival, the installation attracted some controversy. However, more than a million people engaged with it through visitation, related activities and various forms of media.

== Development ==
=== Background ===
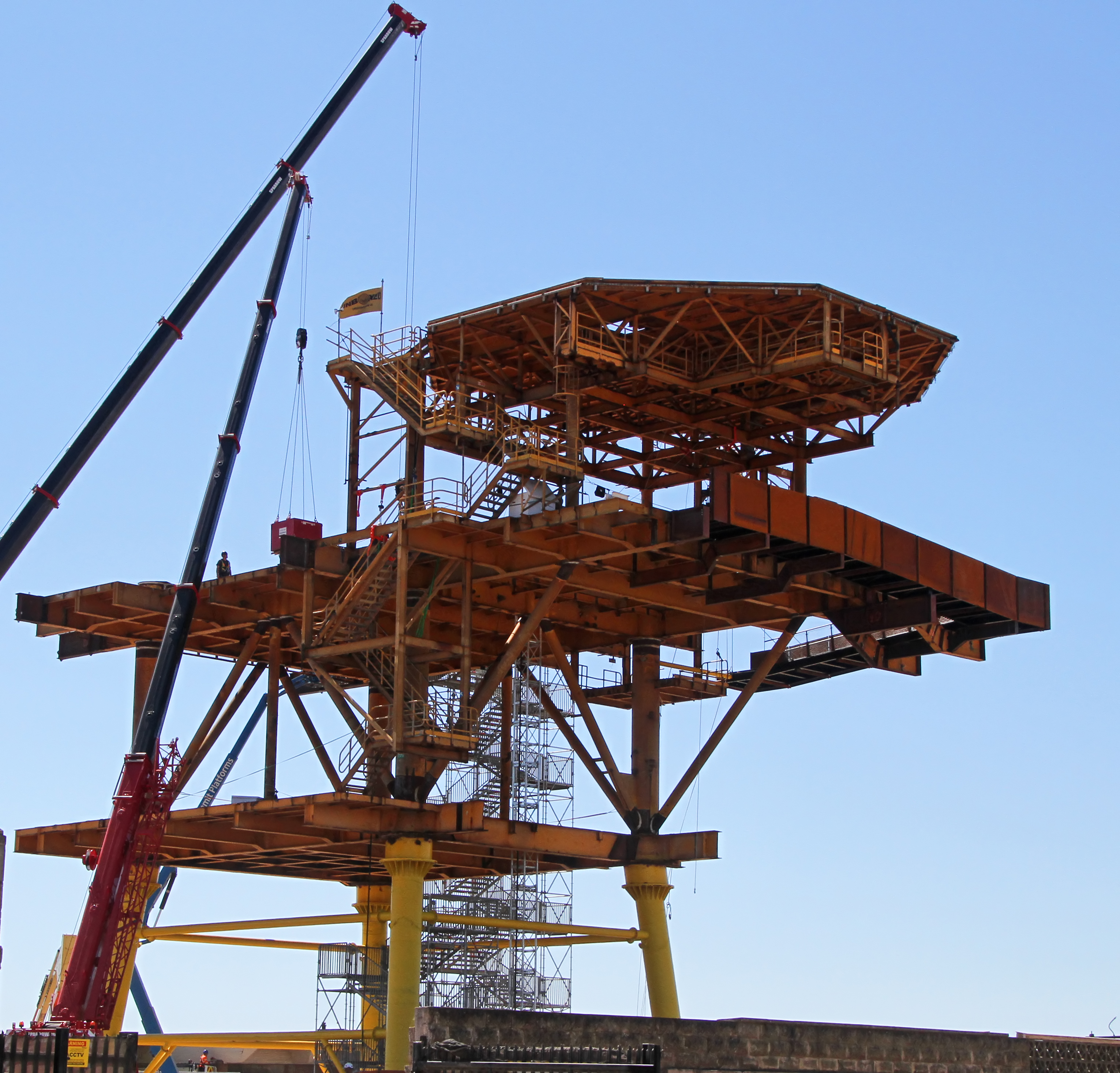
See Monster under construction

See Monster was originally a North Sea offshore platform and was one of ten works commissioned as part of Unboxed: Creativity in the UK, a nationwide arts festival based around science, technology, engineering and mathematics. The installation was located at the Tropicana, an events space and former lido that had previously hosted the Banksy art installation Dismaland in 2015. It was a work of the Leeds creative studio NewSubstance and was supported by North Somerset Council. It was expected to cost £10.5 million.

The intention of See Monster was to inspire people to discuss the sustainable reuse of industrial structures. Martin Green, chief creative officer of Unboxed, said that the installation would "take something that took from the earth and ask it to give back." The installation was purported to be the first example in the world of an offshore platform being repurposed after decommissioning, rather than scrapped.

=== Construction and opening ===
The 450-tonne platform was stripped, repaired and cleaned in a shipyard in the Netherlands over 12 months. It arrived in Weston-super-Mare by barge on 13 July 2022 and was moved onto the beach by a Mammoet self-propelled modular transporter. A 1,500-tonne crane lifted it onto a set of pre-constructed legs within the Tropicana on 16 July.

The opening had originally been planned for July to coincide with the summer holidays, but was ultimately delayed until 23 September. The delay was attributed to the unprecedented nature of the project and to the weather, with construction work being unable to take place during high winds, rain or lightning. A viewing platform opened on 15 August, allowing visitors to watch the construction. The installation was intended to be open until 5 November, but this was later extended to 20 November.

== Overview ==
=== Installation ===
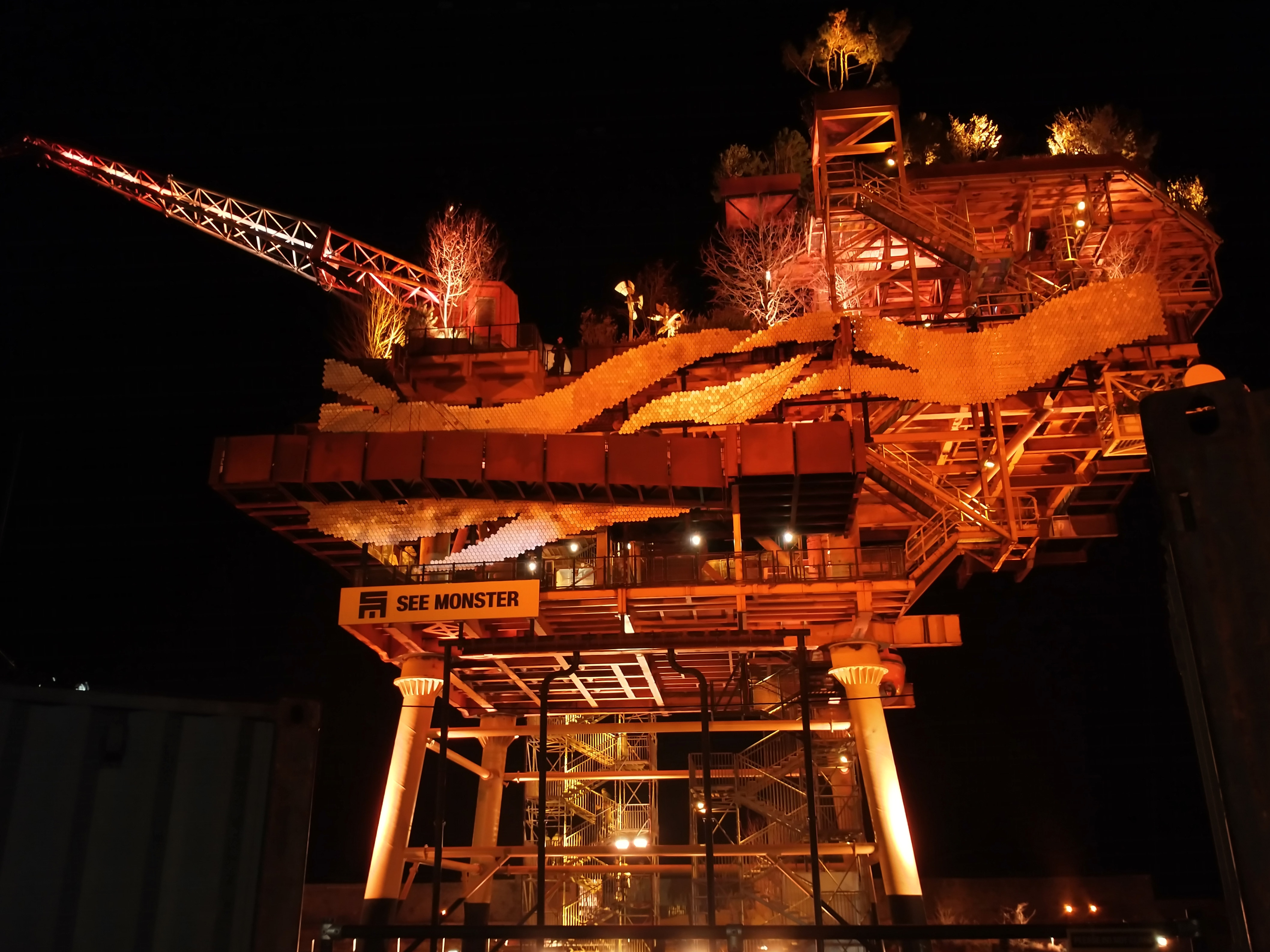
See Monster illuminated at night

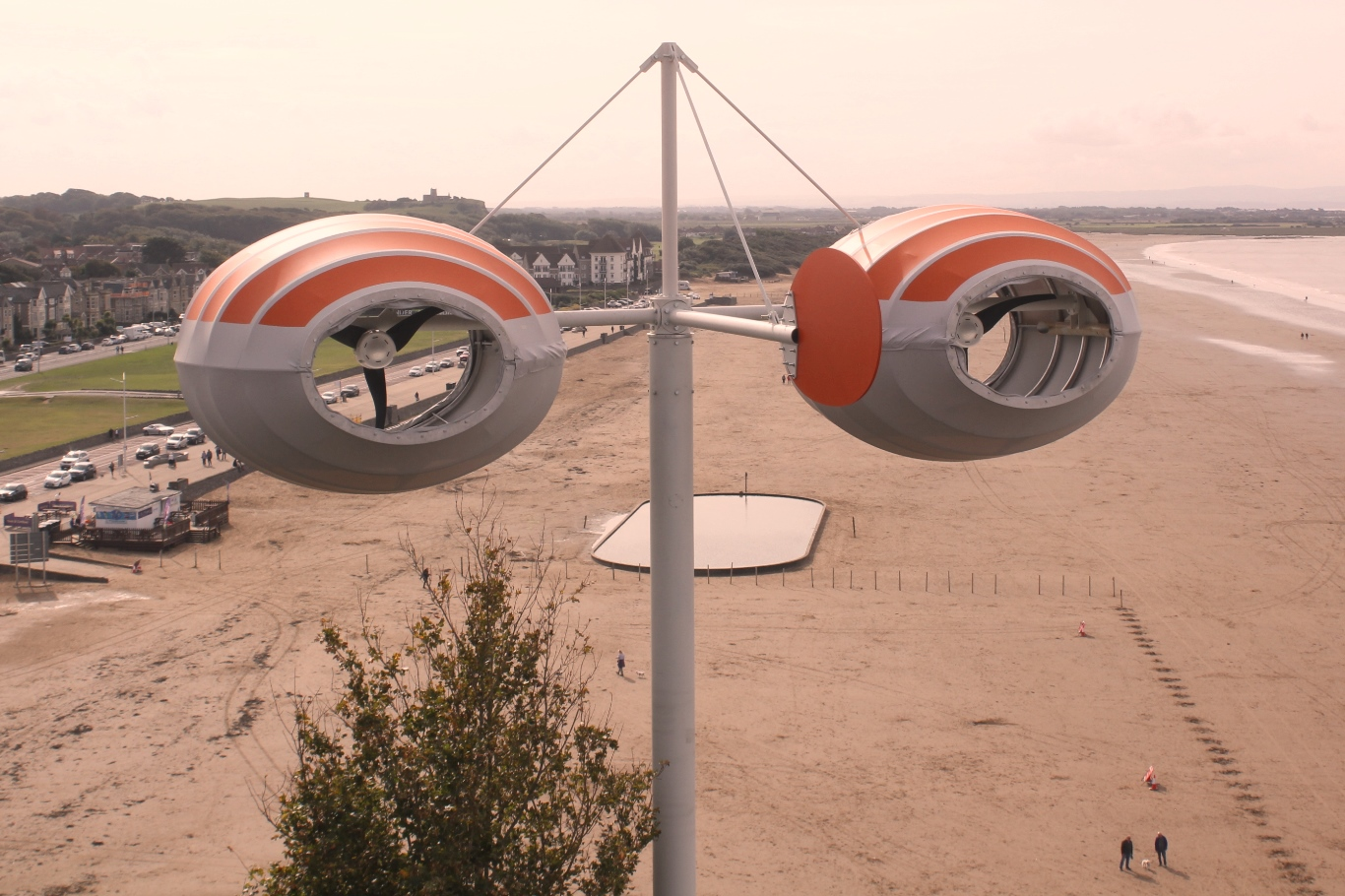
The WindNest by Trevor Lee

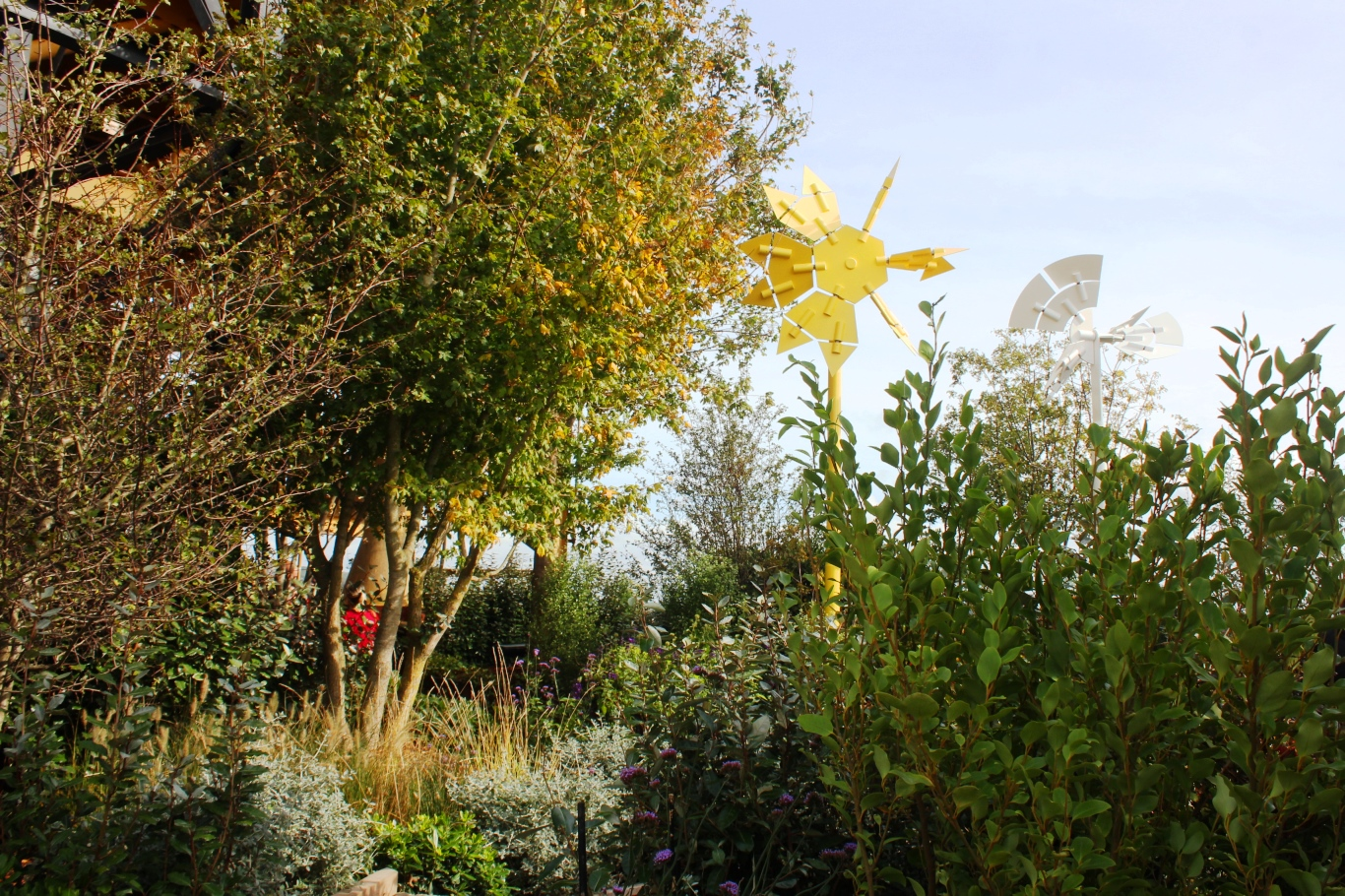
The Garden Lab with kinetic sculptures by Ivan Black

See Monster was 35 metres (115 ft) tall and had four distinct levels. A 10-metre (33 ft) waterfall representing the monster's roar cascaded into the pool in which the platform stood. Above this were the Cellar Deck, Garden Lab and Helideck. More than 6,000 pieces made up a shimmering kinetic artwork representing the monster's scales and a 16-metre (52 ft) crane represented the monster's head and neck.

Other features included a garden of trees and plants grown to survive in a coastal microclimate, a cloud-making machine, an amphitheatre, telescopes to show the view and a curly slide. The installation's irrigation system was powered using renewable energy generated by the WindNest, an artwork by Trevor Lee comprising two rotating pods generating wind power, and the Solar Tree, comprising a solar panel mounted atop a metal tree generating solar power. There were also two kinetic sculptures by Ivan Black representing the Sun and Moon, as well as a studio from which radio programmes and podcasts were broadcast.

=== Programmes ===
In addition to the physical installation, there was a learning programme offering educational visits and resources to schoolchildren, young people, Scouts, youth groups and students and a think tank programme involving local residents.

=== Drone light shows ===
Prior to See Monster's opening, a series of three drone light shows called The Awakening took place on Weston-super-Mare seafront on 28 August, 30 August and 1 September 2022. They were performed by SkyMagic and involved 400 drones.

== Reception ==
=== Reaction and controversy ===
Patrick O'Mahony, See Monster's creative director, expected that the installation would "split opinion" but remarked that he would "rather people love it or hate it rather than being indifferent" and that "there's nothing worse than doing something people have no reaction to." Charlotte Lytton, writing for The Telegraph, compared See Monster favourably to Dismaland and remarked, "even if its eco-message does not entirely cut through, this is the better end of public art: a supersized spectacle in equal parts immersive and unusual."

Julian Knight, chair of the Digital, Culture, Media and Sport Committee, said that the installation looked "fantastic" but criticised the fact that the delay caused it to miss the summer holidays, questioned the relevance of it and the other Unboxed installations to the public and described the festival as an "irresponsible use of public money." The installation's delay was also criticised locally, although some suggested that the later opening had helped to prolong Weston-super-Mare's tourist season. Knight called for an investigation into the festival and the National Audit Office (NAO) subsequently announced that it would conduct one.

=== Audience engagement ===
Unboxed announced overall audience engagement of 1,087,646 for See Monster, including 512,261 through visitation, 87,211 through the learning programme and 5,852 through participation, as well as 394,822 through digital media, 67,500 through broadcast media and 20,000 through print media. North Somerset Council reported that 6,000 engaged with the think tank programme and an estimated 70,000 attended the drone light shows.

The installation was reported to have attracted visitors from across the country and from abroad, with some queuing for two to three hours to enter. See Monster's success provided an economic boost to Weston-super-Mare, with numerous local businesses reporting increased custom during its opening. Unboxed cited the installation's popularity as the reason for extending its opening. Some local residents called for it to remain permanently.

=== Accolades ===
On 30 May 2023, See Monster was the popular choice winner in the Pop-Ups & Temporary category in the 2023 Architizer A+Awards.

== Decommissioning and See Monster Garden ==
Work to dismantle See Monster began on 21 November 2022 and was completed in early 2023. The structure was recycled, with some of the features being donated to local projects and the trees and plants being replanted around Weston-super-Mare. See Monster Garden, a public garden on Weston-super-Mare seafront featuring many of the trees and plants from the installation, and intended as a lasting legacy, opened on 24 July 2023.
