= Vikki Heywood =

Dame Victoria Mary Taylor Heywood, DBE, known as Vikki Heywood is a member of the Board of the National Theatre and a published author. Her debut novel, Miss Veal and Miss Ham was published in July 2025.

She is a former chairman of Mountview Drama Academy and the Royal Society of Arts (RSA, where she was the first chairman to be offered a second term in office. She is also a former chairman of 14-18 Now, the UK's five year commemoration of the First World War and Unboxed:_Creativity_in_the_UK. She is a former executive director of the Royal Shakespeare Company and the Royal Court Theatre, London, and the London International Festival of Theatre. She was chief executive of the Contact Theatre, Manchester.

From Commander of the Order of the British Empire (CBE), she was elevated to Dame Commander of the Order of the British Empire (DBE) in the 2020 Birthday Honours for services to the arts.

In August 2025, she was a guest on the Off the Shelf podcast.
