= Jani Leinonen =

Finnish visual artist

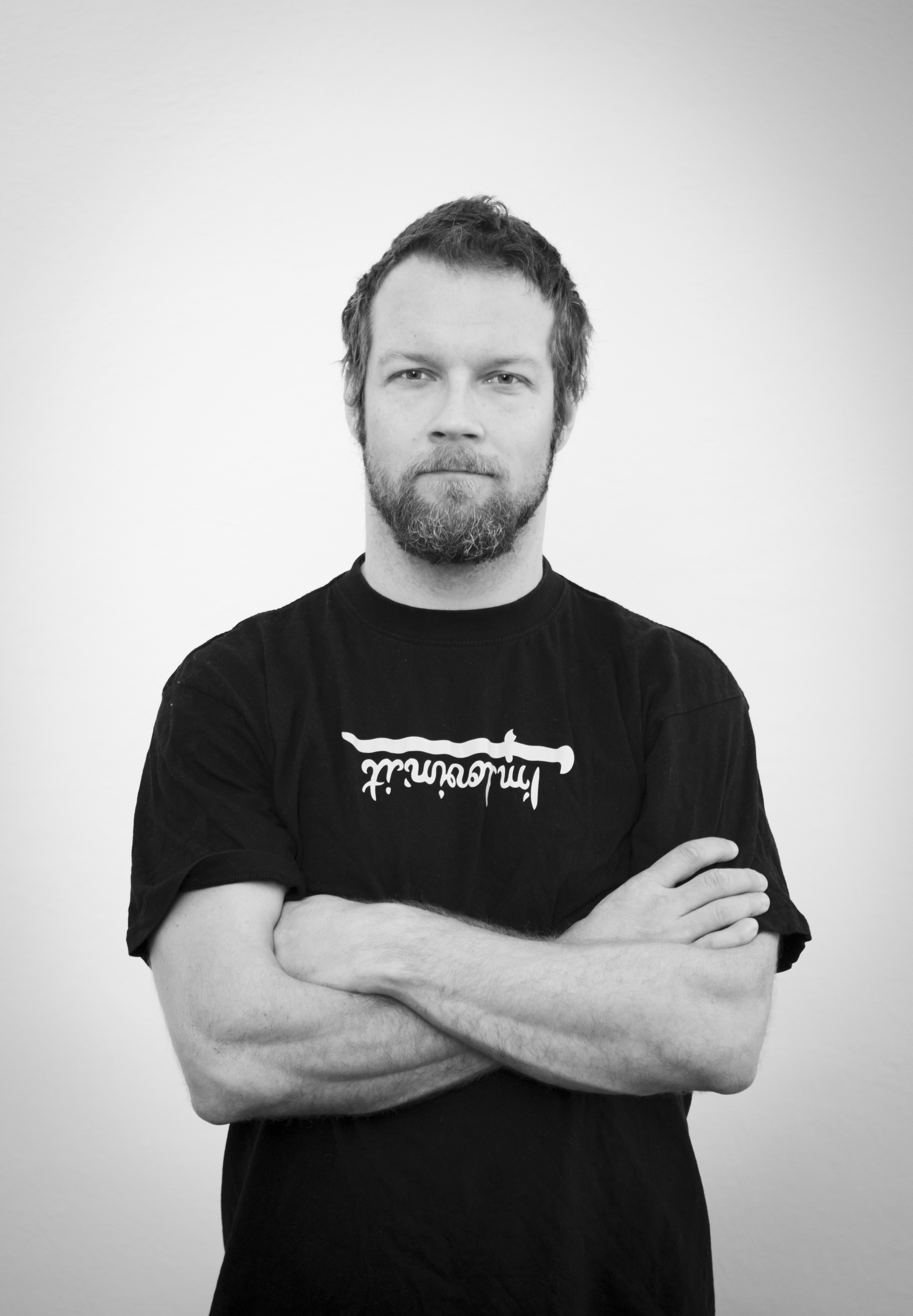
Jani Leinonen in 2015.

Jani Leinonen (born 22 March 1978 in Hyvinkää) is a Finnish visual artist. Leinonen is known for his public artworks criticising capitalism by using the imagery and icons of corporate brands. He graduated from the Helsinki Academy of Fine Arts in 2002.

== Artworks and controversies ==
In January 2011, Leinonen led a group calling themselves the "Food Liberation Army". The group stole a life-size statue of Ronald McDonald from a Helsinki McDonald's restaurant, and posted videos on their website threatening to "decapitate" the clown if McDonald's would not answer questions about its ethics. However, McDonald's refused to "negotiate with criminals", and the Finnish police raided Leinonen's home, arresting two people and seizing cell phones and computers.

In June 2014, Leinonen's Budapest pop-up installation "Hunger King" criticized Hungary's law that banned homeless people from sleeping in public areas. The installation imitated a Burger King restaurant.

In December 2014, a Tokyo gallery removed Hello Kitty and Doraemon-branded shoes that were a part of Leinonen's exhibition satirising copyright laws.

In 2015, Leinonen was one of the artists invited to the temporary art project Dismaland organised by street artist Banksy.

In January 2019, Leinonen's artwork "McJesus", a crucified Ronald McDonald, caused a riot in Haifa, Israel. Hundreds of Christian protesters gathered by the Haifa Museum of Art throwing stones at the police, as they were blocked from entering the museum to remove the statue. Leinonen stated that he asked the Museum to remove it in September 2018 but his request was denied, and his art piece was being displayed against his wishes. The Museum staff contacted Leinonen prior to opening the exhibition, asking for the work, and he referred them to the Zetterberg Gallery, which owns the work. The gallery loaned the statue to the museum. It was reported that after Leinonen's request for its removal, the museum contacted the gallery and received approval from them to continue exhibiting the artwork.

In 2023, McJesus was exhibited in Museu de l'Art Prohibit (Museum of Forbidden Art) in Barcelona in an exhibition devoted to previously censored art.
