= Tropicana, Weston-super-Mare =

Former Swimming Pool, Now Multipurpose Event Space in Somerset, England

Coordinates: 51.3409°N 2.9828°W

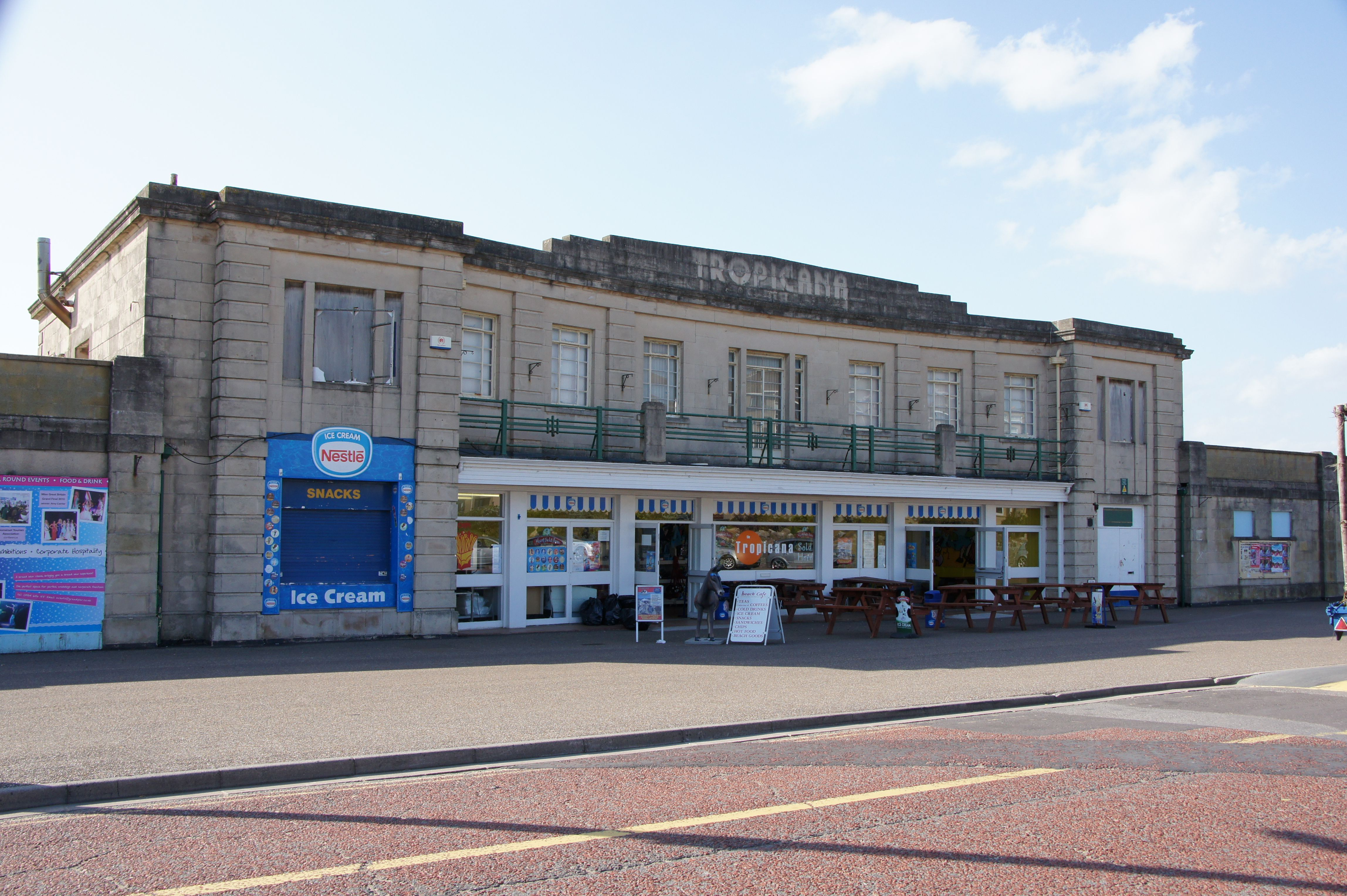
Tropicana

The Tropicana, known prior to 1983 as simply 'The Pool' is a former lido located in the seaside town of Weston-super-Mare in North Somerset, England, on the Bristol Channel coast, on the southern section of the seafront.

After closing in 2000, the site lay derelict for 15 years, until receiving a facelift in 2015 and re-opening as a multipurpose event space the following year. It played host to the Banksy art installation "Dismaland," a twisted parody of Disneyland and the See Monster - a repurposed offshore drilling platform. As of 2026, it is undergoing renovations to become a "nationally significant" events venue.

Prior to its closure, the venue offered multi-use indoor and outdoor event space, with capacities suitable of accommodating a diverse range of events including corporate, charity, exhibitions, music, arts and culture events.

== Construction ==
The site was first developed as a 950 square metres (10,200 sq ft) swimming pool in 1937 and included an art deco diving board. At the time it had the highest diving board and was the largest open air swimming pool in Europe. When it was opened it was simply known as "The Pool", becoming branded as Tropicana in 1983. The reinforced concrete diving board was demolished in 1982. As part of the rebranding, features such as slides, a wave machine were introduced. The Tropicana had enormous fruits as a feature and adopted the tag line, "It's fun and fruity. It's wet and wild". It remained a popular attraction for many years.

== Redevelopment plans ==
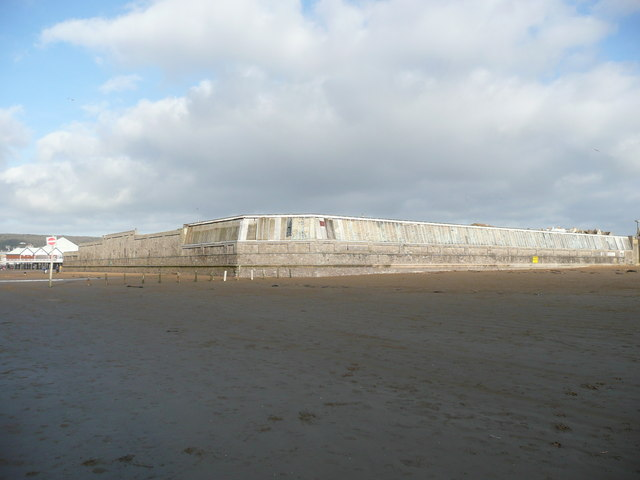
The wall facing the sea, prior to redevelopment (picture taken in 2008)

In 2000, the Tropicana closed. Subsequently, a number of unsuccessful attempts were made to redevelop or re-open the facility:

In 2003, North Somerset Council granted planning permission for a new pool to be developed by Mace Estates; however in 2004 Mace withdrew.

In 2005, Henry Boot plc was chosen as the developer, but the recession of 2008 onwards caused them to pull out.

In early 2011, developer Richard Nightingale withdrew following a dispute with the council over his plans for the site.

In August 2011, the council announced it was giving developers one last chance to rebuild the old complex which by then had been shut for 11 years. But it was announced in November 2011 that a working group had made a recommendation to the council to demolish the Tropicana. In August 2012, it was announced that the council had been given approval by the Secretary of State for Communities and Local Government to demolish the pool on the sea front and for the land to be cleared and returned to beach with a new sea wall.

In February 2013, the council granted planning permission to a consortium of local businesses, Trop Ltd, who intended to build a new swimming pool complex on the site. As the land owner, however, the council has not yet given Trop Ltd permission to build on the site.

During 2015, as part of the works to make the building safe (and clean the facade) The Bay Cafe opened in the front section of the old building.

In 2025, plans were put forth to demolish the 1980s extensions to the building and construct a new, indoor event space on the site, with the original 1930s facade restored alongside it. Initially, the plans were met with severe backlash, some describing the new building as a "1980s warehouse" and "architectural vandalism," however following a slight reworking to the design of the new building, the plans were approved late in the year, with demolition work on the building beginning early in 2026.

== Dismaland ==
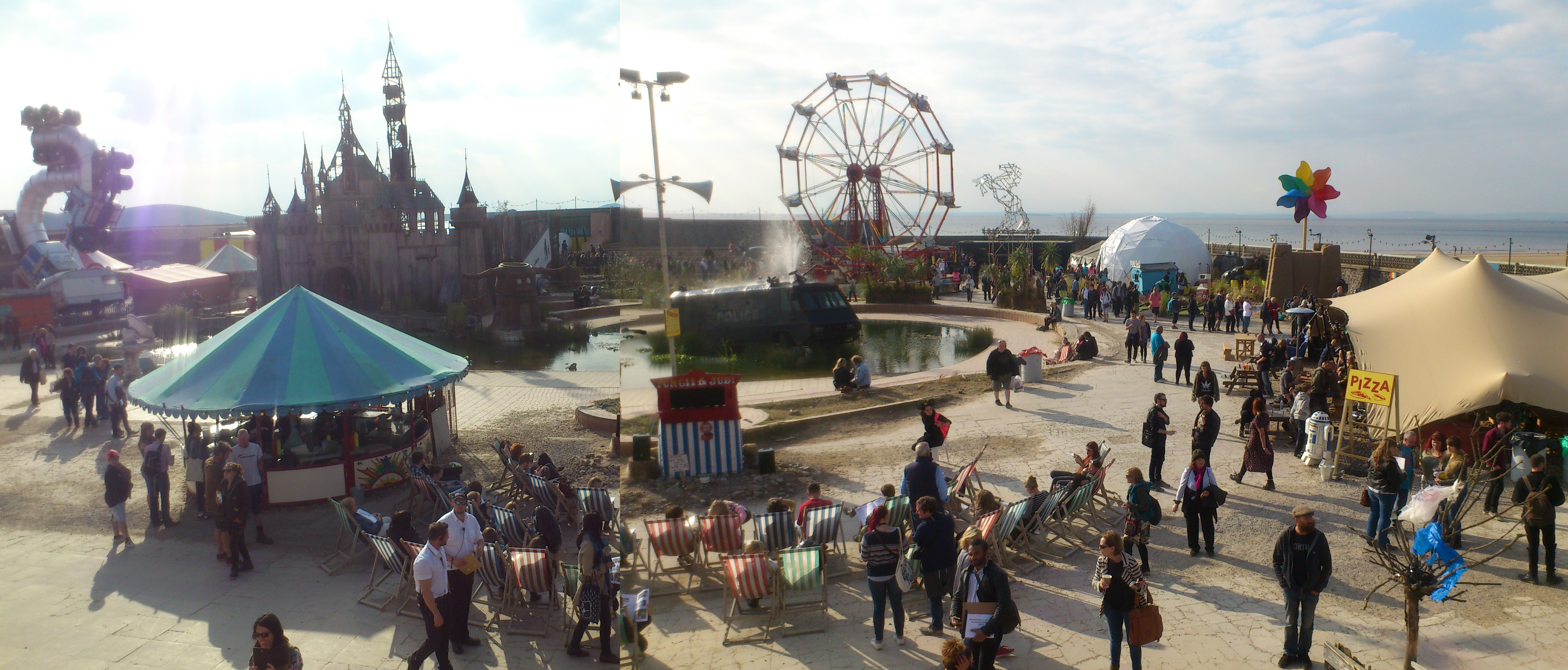
The Dismaland art installation

In August 2015 it was announced that Dismaland, an art installation, would be curated at the Tropicana by the artist Banksy. The "sinister twist on Disneyland" opened during the weekend of 21 August 2015 and ran until 27 September 2015, attracting 150,000 visitors from all over the world and generating an estimated £20m in extra revenue for the town.

== Events ==
In November 2015 it was announced that the council would be spending a further £550,000 bringing the site into safe usage and in partnership with local arts development charity The Theatre Orchard, was opening "Tropicana Theatre" with seasonal events over December and January with a view to running regular events in the future. A consultation process was launched on 9 March 2016 with the engagement of local and regional artists, producers and residents, headed up by Wayne Hemingway.

The renaissance of the Tropicana continues as it's transformed into a pop-up amusement park 'Funland' during the summer of 2016. 'Funland' has since returned in the summers of 2018, 2021 and 2023.

Since 2016, the Tropicana has become available to hire out as an event venue – it hosts a diverse programme of entertainment including live music, theatre, comedy, funfairs and circus by the sea.

== See Monster ==
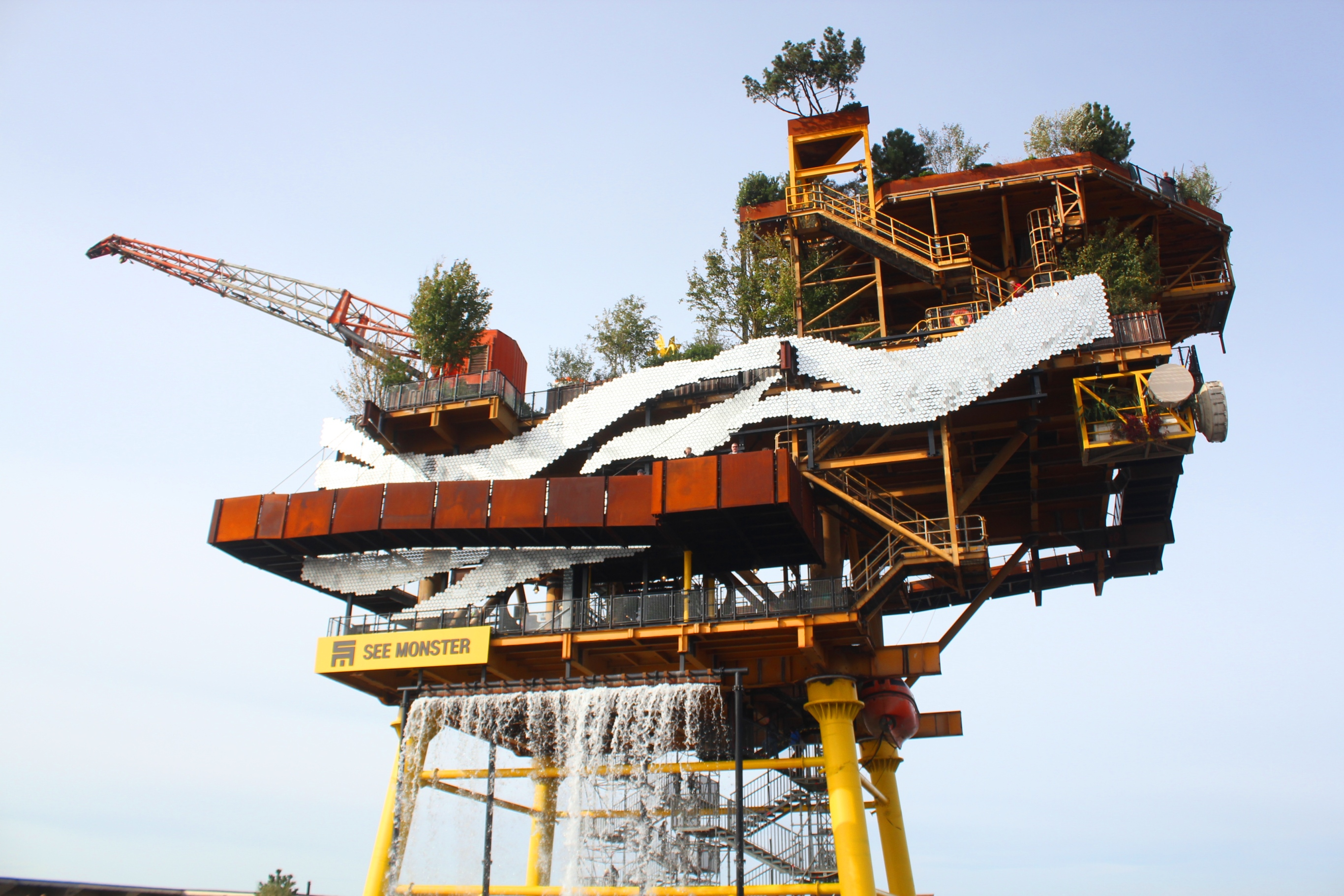
See Monster in the Tropicana

From 23 September to 20 November 2022, the Tropicana hosted a public art installation called See Monster as part of the nationwide arts festival Unboxed: Creativity in the UK. The installation consisted of a decommissioned North Sea offshore drilling platform featuring a garden, a waterfall, kinetic scales, artworks collecting renewable energy, a cloud-making machine and a curly slide. Its opening was preceded by three drone light shows. The installation was successful, with more than 500,000 people engaging with it overall through visitation, involvement in related programmes and attendance to the shows.
