= Unboxed: Creativity in the UK =

UK government-funded celebration held in 2022

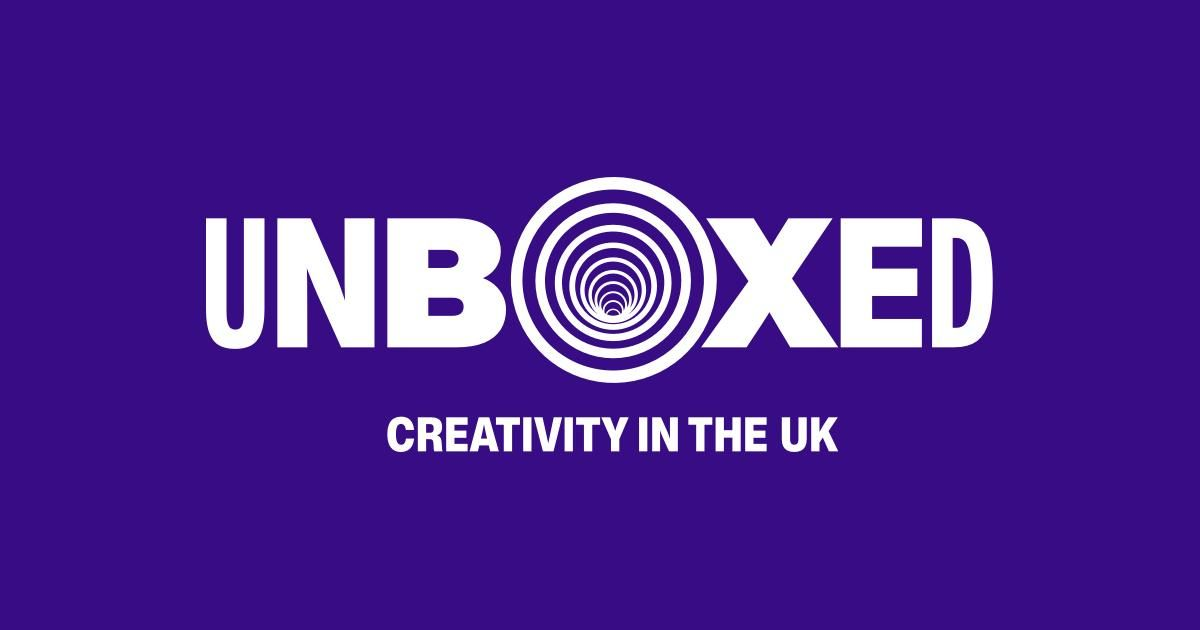
- Unboxed: Creativity in the UK logo

Overview
- BIE-class: Unrecognized exposition
- Name: Unboxed: Creativity in the UK
- Motto: Creativity in the UK

Participant(s)
- Countries: 1

Location
- Country: United Kingdom

Timeline
- Opening: 1 March 2022
- Closure: 20 November 2022

Internet
- Website: https://unboxed2022.uk/

Unboxed: Creativity in the UK, previously known as Festival UK* 2022, was a national celebration in the United Kingdom first announced in 2018 by the Conservative government following the Brexit referendum. The festival events took place from March to November 2022, at 107 locations across the UK, at a reported cost of £120 million. Organisers announced an audience of 18 million and described the festival as "a major investment in areas across the UK that are often underserved by cultural investment."

The concept was first proposed as a Festival of Great Britain and Northern Ireland, and referred to by Jacob Rees-Mogg, later minister for Brexit opportunities, as the Festival of Brexit—a nickname which became widely used—but was later rebranded as Unboxed: Creativity in the UK, with all mention of Brexit being avoided. Unlike the 1951 Festival of Britain, which was focused on a main site in London, the festival comprises ten projects "shaped across science, technology, engineering, the arts and mathematics". It is spread across multiple venues in the four countries of the UK, and accessible in person free of charge, on TV, on radio and online.

== Background ==
Unboxed was a series of 10 art, science and technology projects. The programme was first unveiled in 2018 by then prime minister Theresa May following the Brexit referendum, and was subsequently approved by Boris Johnson. May stated that the project would "celebrate our nation's diversity and talent" and conjure the spirit of the 1851 Great Exhibition and 1951 Festival of Britain.

Unlike the 1951 Festival of Britain, which despite having events and exhibitions across the country was focused on a main site in London, Unboxed comprised ten projects "shaped across science, technology, engineering, the arts and mathematics" and is spread across multiple venues in the four countries of the UK, and accessible in person free of charge, on TV, on radio and online.

In early 2020 it was announced that Martin Green, who previously organised the opening and closing ceremonies of the London 2012 Olympics and Hull UK City of Culture 2017, had been selected to head the initiative. Dame Vikki Heywood was appointed chair of the project.

In May 2021 VisitBritain said that major events including the festival were "set to be significant tourism draws" in the wake of the COVID-19 pandemic. In June 2021 the Department for Digital, Culture Media and Sport announced details of a Tourism Recovery Plan to return tourism levels to pre-pandemic levels, highlighting the festival as a major part of this plan, along with other major national events such as the Queen's Platinum Jubilee and the 2022 Commonwealth Games.

The festival's events programme began in March 2022 and concluded on 20 November 2022. The cost of the festival is reported to be £120 million.

== Name ==
Under Prime Minister Theresa May, the festival was provisionally named as the "Festival of Great Britain and Northern Ireland", and described as a "nationwide festival in celebration of the creativity and innovation of the United Kingdom".

Jacob Rees-Mogg referred to it as the "Festival of Brexit"; although not the official name the nickname quickly took hold as the popular description of the event, and was widely used by the press, The nickname politicised the festival; this has been cited as a major reason for the failure of Unboxed to attract the hoped-for number of visitors.

The "Brexit" branding was rejected by the festival's organisers, with the initiative being temporarily branded as Festival UK 2022 until, in October 2021, it was announced that the festival had been rebranded again as Unboxed: Creativity in the UK.

== Projects ==
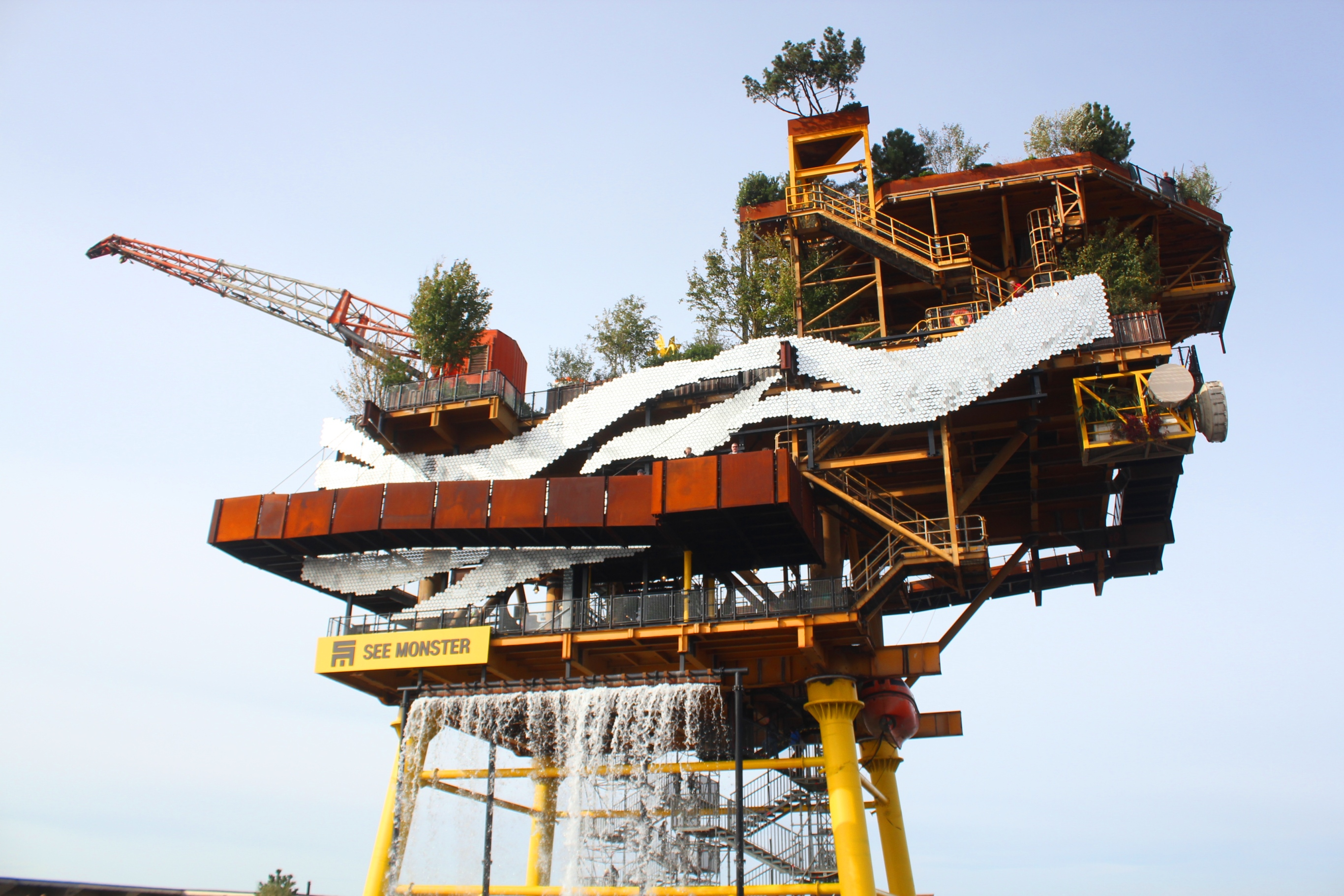
See Monster, one of the art installations

In September 2020 an open call for project applications was issued, with applicants invited to apply to a £3m research and development programme. From this call, thirty teams were to be shortlisted and awarded £100,000 each to further develop their ideas, with a final ten large-scale projects then selected and commissioned. Applicants were expected to "platform emerging talent and under-represented voices" and include experts from across the core STEAM subjects. Lead bidders were also required to hold experience or the ability to deliver ‘complex, large-scale projects’.

In November 2020 the thirty shortlisted projects were selected from 299 submissions involving almost 3,000 organisations. Jamie Oliver, historian David Olusoga and theatre producer Sonia Friedman were involved in the thirty shortlisted teams to take part in the festival, with these teams involving over 500 creatives. The British Film Institute, British Library, Eden Project, Imperial War Museum and the Tate galleries, along with tech firms Siemens and IBM and organisations including The European Space Agency, the British Antarctic Survey and the Canal and River Trust were also cited as participants in the festival.

The thirty shortlisted teams pitched their proposals to a panel in February 2021. The 10 large-scale projects winning projects were announced in March 2021. Each winning project receiving funding, was required to represent the arts, as well as two other STEAM sectors. It was announced that all 20 of the shortlisted projects that were not selected would continue to receive festival support, and that all 30 shortlisted projects would be turned into a publicly accessible resource under a Creative Commons licence.

Some of the projects selected include an educational focus, such as About Us, which is expected to be a poetry anthology and outdoor installation incorporating the work of young people's around the country and working with artists in Caernarfon, Derry, Hull, Luton and Paisley and Dandelion, where "growing cubes" will be distributed to 100 secondary schools in Scotland. Other projects include Galwad, a multimedia event hosted by the National Theatre Wales in Welsh and English discussing the future of the country; See Monster, an art installation in Weston-super-Mare converting a decommissioned North Sea offshore rig into a public viewing platform; StoryTrails, which will use technology from Pokémon Go developer Niantic to tell the story of 15 towns and cities across the UK.

Details of the projects are given on the Unboxed website; a critical review with many details was published by Stuart McGurk in The House magazine. The ten major projects were:

- About Us (Paisley, Derry, Caernarfon, Luton, Hull and Tower of London)
- Dandelion (various locations across Scotland)
- Dreamachine (various locations across UK)
- Galwad (Sky Arts Television, YouTube, Internet)
- Green Space Dark Skies (various locations across UK)
- Our Place in Space (Northern Ireland, Cambridge and Liverpool)
- PoliNations (Birmingham)
- See Monster (Weston-super-Mare)
- StoryTrails (various locations across Great Britain)
- Tour de Moon (various locations across England)

== Audience ==
At the beginning of September 2022, it was suggested in Parliament's The House magazine that 238,000 visitors had attended so far, 0.36% of the 66 million target. However Unboxed responded that this number only counted eight of the 107 physical locations of the programme. It has been proposed that the original political branding as a "Festival of Brexit" may be behind the failure to attract visitors. The figure for total attendance was eventually revised upwards to a total of 2.8 million physical attendees across all venues over the life of the project, with 13.5 million digital visitors (of which an estimated 6 million were viewers of a single Countryfile episode featuring the festival in a 15 minute segment) and 1.7 million participating in other activities.

In October 2022, the National Audit Office (NAO) was asked to examine the delivery and value for money of the Unboxed festival by the Digital, Culture, Media and Sport Committee. The NAO was to report in late 2022 on "the costs and benefits associated with Unboxed; its management as a programme including accountabilities and decision- making processes; and planning work undertaken, including forecasting of visitor numbers."

The NAO report found that from data so far available, the 18.1 million audience as a whole was close to targets set in early 2022 but lower than that modelled in the 2021 business case by the Department for Digital, Culture Media and Sport.

== Reaction ==
The Festival as an entity was subject to much critical comment; the ten individual projects received less critical appraisal. The Times opened its review in Cambridge “With “Our Place in Space” the Unboxed Festival comes good.” “PoliNations” was described as “a celebration of colour, beauty, and of natural diversity.” “Dreamachine” received a five-star review in the Standard with the heading “The wildest trip you can take without breaking the law.” "Green Space Dark Skies" in Scotland was reported on by a participant in the Guardian. “Galwad” was reviewed by Wales Arts Review and Theatre Wales unfavourably.

£120 million of public funds were planned to be spent on the event, with the cost of the project drawing criticism and suggestions that the allocated funds might be put to alternative use. MP Jamie Stone launched a petition to campaign for the festival's cancellation.

The festival was described in Frieze magazine by Tom Morton as being "The Spectacular Emptiness of Boris Johnson’s ‘Festival of Brexit'... To expect the progressive, internationalist art world to participate in a celebration of Brexit is to fire a volley into the culture war".

The art group Migrants In Culture wrote an open letter to the festival calling it a "nationalistic branding exercise". The letter has been signed by over 750 UK artists to date. A number of commentators and public figures praised the initiative. Kenny Farquharson in The Times argued that "[UNBOXED] has…transformed into something that on the face of it seems worthwhile and may yet be something great".

Gaby Hinsliff in The Guardian argued that "My hunch is that as a nation we’re going to be rubbishing the festival right up until the day it opens, and will then surprise ourselves by grudgingly quite enjoying it". One Unboxed project, Dreamachine, was indeed praised by a reviewer in The Guardian as "the one good thing to come out of Brexit and worth every penny".

Some Brexit-supporting politicians, including Craig Mackinlay and Marcus Fysh, have expressed dismay at the removal of any mention of Brexit from the festival.

A few months before the event was set to take place, in March 2022, a report from the Digital, Culture, Media and Sport Committee criticised the event as "vague and shape-shifting" saying that it lacked clear direction and was an "irresponsible use of public money". The report added that the event was confusing and obscure and a "recipe for failure".

Naomi Smith, chief executive of Best for Britain group, said the festival was "the perfect metaphor for how Brexit itself has turned out – hugely expensive and deeply unpopular with no one really getting what they wanted".

Stuart McGurk wrote a detailed critical review of the festival and of its individual projects in The House magazine. He pointed out that the festival indeed did not mention Brexit; indeed, some projects were protesting the associations of Brexit and Tory government money. Rather than a festival of British creativity, it was described as "a festival of creativity almost devoid of place".

In January 2023 The Stage magazine published two letters on the subject of the festival. Dame Vikki Heywood, the Festival Chair wrote: "Beyond the debate and the rhetoric, the value of Unboxed must be judged in much richer terms than numbers alone: from the blueprint for innovative models of cross-sector commissioning to the skills it enhanced; from the creative businesses it transformed and the new partnerships that live on to the curriculum-based learning activities delivered across education systems". Raymond Gubbay, producer and impresario, wrote: "A total and irresponsible waste" which Arts Council England could have used better supporting existing organisations under severe financial pressure.

== See also ==
- Great Exhibition
- British Empire Exhibition
- Festival of Britain
- Millennium Dome
- 2012 Summer Olympics
