= Josh Keyes (artist) =

American contemporary artist (born 1969)

- Born: August 17, 1969 (age 57); Tacoma, Washington, U.S.
- Education: School of the Art Institute of Chicago, Yale University
- Spouse: Lisa Ericson

Josh Keyes (born 1969) is an American contemporary artist who makes paintings and prints. He is known for his "eco-surrealist" painting style and images of graffitied covered wilderness. He is based in Portland, Oregon, and previously lived in Oakland, California.

== Biography ==
Josh Keyes was born on August 17, 1969, in Tacoma, Washington.

Keyes has a bachelor's degree (1992) from the School of the Art Institute of Chicago, and a master's degree (1998) in painting and printmaking from Yale University.

== Work ==
Keyes' work has been described as "a satirical look at the impact urban sprawl has on the environment and surmises, with the aid of scientific slices and core samples, what could happen if we continue to infiltrate and encroach on our rural surroundings."

His painting style often includes narrative and the illusion of constructed worlds. Keyes' style is reminiscent of the diagrammatic vocabulary found in scientific textbook illustrations that often express through a detached and clinical viewpoint an empirical representation of the natural world. Assembled into this virtual stage set are references to contemporary events along with images and themes from his personal mythology.

His work is a hybrid of eco-surrealism and dystopia that express a concern and anxiety for our time and the Earth's future.

Keyes' public mural Treadmill (2006), is painted on the side of the Locust Street Garage in Walnut Creek, California.
