= Ben Long (British artist) =

English artist

Ben Long (born 1978 in Lancaster) is an English contemporary visual artist, known for large-scale public works that use everyday materials such as scaffolding in their construction. He lives and works in London.

== Life and work ==
Long graduated from Camberwell College of Arts in 2001 where he was taught and influenced by the British artist Darren Lago. His earliest works were loosely associated with the Street Art and Urban Art movement which blossomed at the beginning of the 21st century.

His first series of artworks, collectively titled The Great Travelling Art Exhibition, were graffiti-style temporary drawings executed in the dirt gathered on shutters of haulage trucks. In 2002 The Great Travelling Art Exhibition was shortlisted for the Pizza Express Prospects contemporary drawing prize. Because these artworks were on the back of trucks, Long submitted videos of himself making the drawings and the vehicles filmed being driven around London.

These were followed by Scaffolding Sculptures, contemporary monuments constructed from the utilitarian building material. In 2009 the Contemporary Art Society commissioned Horse Scaffolding Sculpture for the Economist Plaza in central London. Later in the same year Long's Brass Bandstand was shortlisted by the Arts Council England for the £500,000 Artists Taking The Lead art commission for the North West region of the UK, the prize being later awarded to Anthony McCall for his Projected Column.

During the 2012 Cultural Olympiad, UP Projects in partnership with Haringey Council commissioned Long to construct Lion Scaffolding Sculpture to coincide with day 68 of the Olympic torch relay. Situated on the grounds of Bruce Castle, a former 16th-century manor house, the 9m tall artwork stood from 25 July until 25 September 2012. Speaking about the series Long has stated that: "With each construction I am basically trying to make a contemporary British monument that reflects the change and evolution that our towns and cities are constantly subjected to."

In 2014 Long was invited by the City of London Corporation and Sculpture In the City to exhibit an artwork in the capital city's square mile financial district. As a direct response to Robert Indiana's Love sculpture and the 2008 financial crisis, Long created a Scaffolding Sculpture mimicking the style of Indiana's Love, but instead constructing the word WORK from the components.

The sculpture was erected in front of the entrance of architect Norman Foster's landmark building 30 St Mary Axe, more commonly known as 'the Gherkin', in June 2014, on loan until summer 2015. In August 2014 IVG, one of the two owners of 30 St Mary Axe, filed for insolvency and the building went into receivership. Work Scaffolding Sculpture was subsequently removed at the request of the receivers of 30 St Mary Axe, having stood there for 9 weeks.

In 2015, Long exhibited several works including Horse Scaffolding Sculpture as part of Banksy's five week long Dismaland art show at the former Tropicana Lido in the English sea-side town of Weston-Super-Mare.

Solo gallery exhibitions of Long's work include Crown Jewels (2009) and Art Work (2008).
