= Bill Barminski =

American artist and filmmaker

Bill Barminski (born November 26, 1962) is an American self taught artist and filmmaker born in Chicago, Illinois. His work has been part of creative projects such as Banksy's Dismaland, Beyond The Streets and The Cunning Little Vixen, a new media production of the Leoš Janáček opera produced by the Cleveland Orchestra. He works in many mediums and starting in 2008 began producing cardboard sculptures that focus on white forms with pinstripe outlines to convey the notion of 3 dimensional drawings. In 2018 he was a participating artist in Beyond The Streets artshow curated by Roger Gastman. In 2019 Barminski created a cardboard living room where visitors were encouraged to play with the artwork for the New York City iteration of Beyond the Streets.

Art by Barminski ca 1996

== Life and art ==
Born in Chicago, Barminski moved with his family to Fort Worth, Texas when he was 10.

While attending the University of Texas at Austin as an art major, he was a contributor of satirical cartoons to the student newspaper, The Daily Texan. The cartoon strip, entitled "King of the Pre-Fab", featured Dick Nixon, a used car salesman and campus gadfly. Despite repeated efforts by the student's association to have him removed, Barminski went on to create the underground comicbook, Tex Hitler, Fascist Gun in the West. Author and cultural critic, Greil Marcus references this character in Artforum as being an offshoot of the Situationist International political movement: "What's most remarkable about Bill Barminski's Fascist Gun in the West is how quickly and completely it pulls you into its twisted, yet utterly familiar little world".

After dropping out of art school in 1985, Barminski moved to Los Angeles where he continued to produce his hand-bound comic books. He began in earnest to paint. His first show in 1986 in a downtown L.A. gallery, Oranges/Sardines, created a minor sensation and resulted in modest sales.

His work caught the eye of record producer, Scott Arundale, who commissioned him to create the album cover for an Industrial/Tribal band, "Death Ride '69". The image of Elvis Presley as Jesus Christ was later acknowledged and reprinted in the Greil Marcus book, Dead Elvis: A Chronicle of a Cultural Obsession (1991), about the phenomenon of the Rock 'n' Roll icon in the years since his death.

The themes and style of his work critique mass media and consumer culture. His exhibitions usually contain installation elements showcasing a video work produced for each show. His richly textured paintings have been reviewed in numerous publications such as Flash Art, Art in America, ARTnews, Visions Art Quarterly, New American Paintings, and the LA Weekly.

Tobey Crockett describes his work in a 1996 article for Art in America: "The advertising-derived images that Barminski incorporates into his paintings are meant to evoke postwar America. Like filmmaker David Lynch and others, Barminski is interested in the ominously surreal side of the good life."

Barminski's paintings are prominently featured in the movie Horseplayer (1990). The film stars Brad Dourif as a homicidal artist living in downtown Los Angeles and Barminski makes a cameo appearance. His paintings have adorned the walls of several feature films including Sliver (1993) and Zero Effect (1998) as well as the TV show, Friends. In 1996, he designed the album art for the School of Fish recording, "Human Cannonball".

In 1998, Barminski is credited with designing the largest and most expensive billboard ever commissioned by Absolut Vodka which remained on the Sunset strip for over two years.

More recently Barminski has created artwork and sculpture in cardboard. In 2011 he was part of a show in London at POW Gallery that featured artists Evol, Tilt, Dran, Paul Insect, Jimmy Caulty, Banksy and others.

In 2014 Barminski collaborated with opera director Yuval Sharon to create an innovative version of Leoš Janáček's opera The Cunning Little Vixen. Performed by the Cleveland Orchestra at the Severance Hall and conducted by Franz Welser-Möst, the production returned the opera to its comic-strip roots; Janáček was inspired by a daily comic strip that followed the adventures of a female fox called Sharp Ears. Barminski and Christopher Louie created a hand-drawn animated world that captured the simple yet beautiful world of the Cunning Little Vixen.

In 2015, Barminski was part of Banksy's Dismaland art show along with artists Damien Hirst, Jenny Holzer, Escif and others. For Dismaland he created a cardboard security entrance that every visitor to the park had to enter through.

Since 1998, Barminski has taught digital art and design at UCLA School of Theater, Film and Television.

== Music video ==
In 1999, Baz Luhrmann hired Barminski to create a music video for his song "Everybody's Free (To Wear Sunscreen)", based on Mary Schmich's newspaper column, "Wear Sunscreen". The spoken word piece is set to music by Luhrmann and features animation and home movies of Barminski and his family. The video aired on all major networks in the U.S. and was featured on The Tonight Show, The Today Show and The View as well as VH1 and MTV. It also appeared in the UK, Australia and Japan.

The Goo Goo Dolls commissioned him the following year to create a video to be presented on stage as part of their 2000 summer concert tour. Entitled "Greed in Action", the four-minute piece features stock footage and original flash animations by the artist including American vintage automobiles being dropped from B-52 Stratofortress bombers.

Barminski worked with director Peter Howitt and Oscar-winning editor Zach Staenberg to create multiple video sequences for the feature film Antitrust (2001), starring Tim Robbins and loosely based on the real-life creator of a major software conglomerate.

In 2001, H&M, an international clothing retailer of Sweden, commissioned him to create a music video to present to its corporate staff entitled "Add Your Note".

Barminski joined forces with Christopher Louie in 2007, to create a fictional film director named Walter Robot. The very same robot stars in his own video for the band Modest Mouse called Missed the Boat.

The duo has created numerous videos for bands such as Gnarls Barkley, Rob Thomas, Hawthorn Heights, Underoath and Death Cab for Cutie. Their animated Death Cab for Cutie video for the song "Grapevine Fires" won several awards including Best Music Video at the 2009 Los Angeles Film Festival and was nominated for Breakthrough Video of the Year MTV, 2009.

Art by Barminski, ca 2002

== Digital media ==
Barminski is an accomplished Flash, Shockwave and After Effects designer with his many musical and digital art compositions available on his website. Macromedia frequently awarded him "Flash Site of the Day" during the late 1990s as he constantly tinkered with and updated his on-line works.

Barminski is author and co-creator (along with Webster Lewin and Jerry Hesketh) of "The Encyclopedia of Clamps", an interactive CD-ROM game featuring an amusement park of games and social and political commentary. It was awarded first prize for Best Foreign Package at the Tokyo MultiMedia Grand Prix in 1997.

During the same year, Barminski and Webster Lewin created the original character Cyclops Boy, featured in the internet series Cyclops Boy: The One-Eyed Detective in Satellite Sky. It won Best Multimedia Award at the FilmWinter Fest in Stuttgart, Germany.

In 2006, Barminski created a video for Mortified, the spoken word project ripped from the pages of real life. Mortified is a comic excavation of adolescent artifacts (journals, letters, poems, lyrics, home movies, stories and more) as shared by their original authors before total strangers. The innovative video has been hailed as a breakthrough in guerilla web marketing.

In 2009 Barminski and Chris Louie worked with Joel Stein to create an animated short, "The Adventures of Joel Stein" which was included in the Sundance 2009 Film festival.
